= Dutch colonization of the Americas =

Overview of colonies established by the Netherlands

The Netherlands began its colonization of the Americas with the establishment of trading posts and plantations. The first forts and settlements along the Essequibo River in Guyana date from the 1590s. Actual colonization, with the Dutch settling in the new lands, was not as common as by other European nations. This colonization preceded the better known colonization activities of the Dutch in Asia; the first Dutch fort in Asia was not built until 1600 in present-day Indonesia.

Many of the Dutch settlements were lost or abandoned by the end of the 17th century, but the Netherlands retained possession of Suriname until it gained independence in 1975. Among its several colonies in the region, only the Dutch Caribbean remains part of the Kingdom of the Netherlands today.

== Mainland in North America ==
=== United States ===
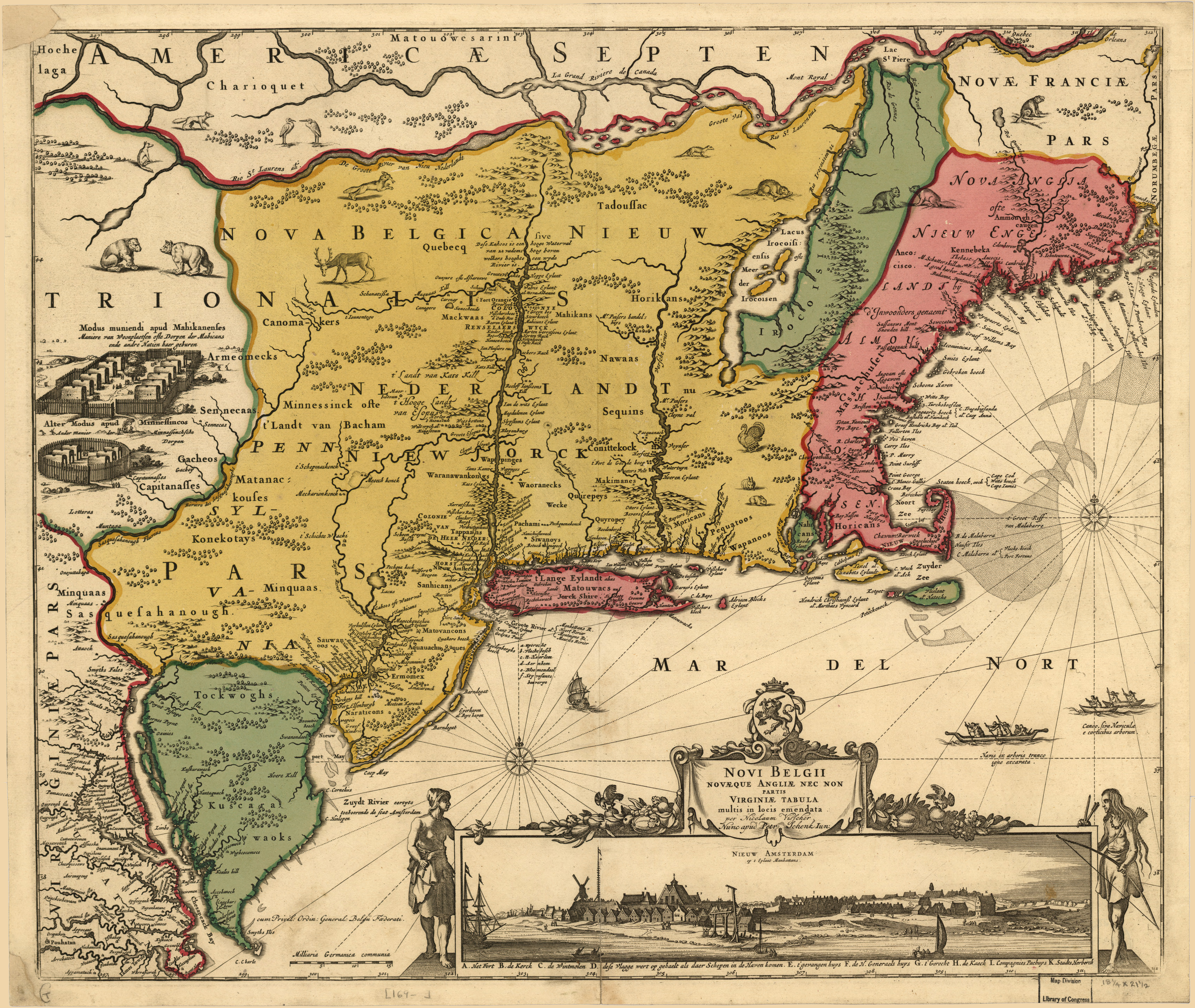
A 1685 reprint of a 1656 map of the Dutch North American colonies showing Dutch territorial claims from Chesapeake Bay and the Susquehanna River in the south and west, to Narragansett Bay and the Providence and Blackstone rivers in the east, to the St. Lawrence River in the north.

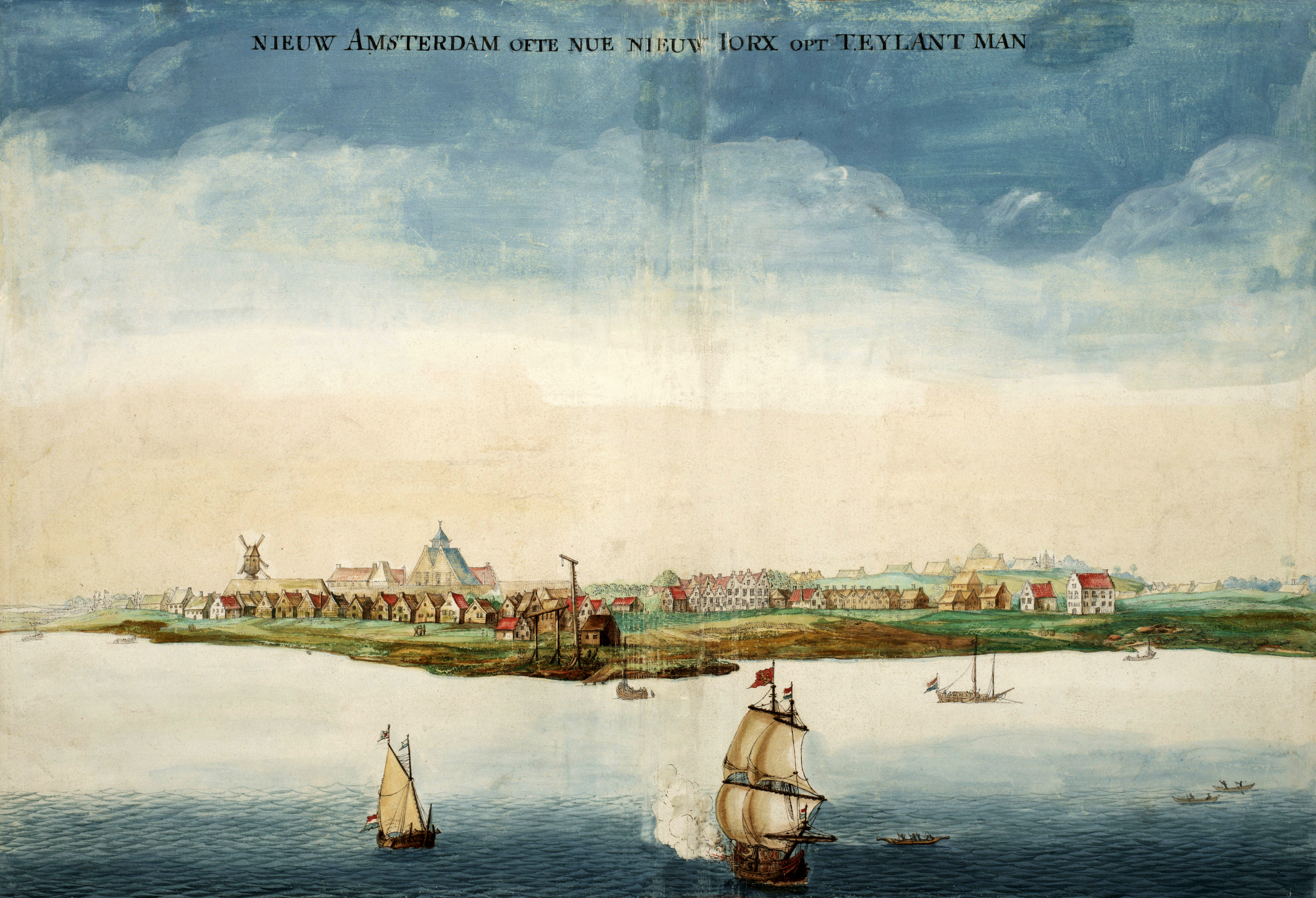
Image of Nieuw Amsterdam created in 1664, the year the city surrendered to English forces under the command of Richard Nicolls.

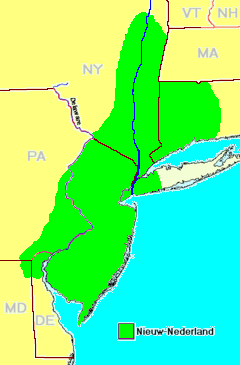
Area settled by the Dutch in 1660.

In 1602, the Republic of the Seven United Netherlands chartered a young and eager Dutch East India Company (VOC) with the mission of exploring North America's rivers and bays for a direct passage through to the Indies. Along the way, Dutch explorers were charged to claim any uncharted areas for the United Provinces, which led to several significant expeditions. Over time, Dutch explorers founded the province of New Netherland. By 1610, the Dutch East India Company had already commissioned English explorer Henry Hudson who, in an attempt to find the Northwest Passage to the Indies, discovered and claimed for the VOC parts of the present-day United States and Canada. Hudson entered the Upper New York Bay by sailboat, heading up the Hudson River, which now bears his name.

On March 27, 1614, the States General would move away from traditional monopolistic endeavors and take a new and freer approach to exploration and commercial development of the New World; the issuance of the General Charter for Those who Discover Any New Passages, Havens, Countries, or Places stated that "the said undertaking to be laudable, honorable, and serviceable for the prosperity of the United Provinces and wishing that the experiment be free and open to all and every of the inhabitants of this country, have invited and do hereby invite all and every of the inhabitants of the United Netherlands to the aforesaid search."

In 1614, Adriaen Block led an expedition to the lower Hudson River in the Tyger, and then explored the East River aboard the Onrust, becoming the first known European to navigate the Hellegat in order to gain access to Long Island Sound. Block Island and Block Island Sound are named in his honor. Upon his return to Amsterdam in 1614, Block compiled a map, and applied the name "New Netherland" for the first time to the area between English Virginia and French Canada, where he was later granted exclusive trading rights by the Dutch government. Block quickly ascended and became Manhattan's first monopolist.

After some early trading expeditions, the first Dutch settlement in the Americas was founded in 1615: Fort Nassau, on Castle Island along the Hudson, near present-day Albany. The settlement served mostly as an outpost for fur trade with the native Lenape tribespeople, but was later replaced by Fort Orange. Both forts were named in honor of the House of Orange-Nassau.

By 1621, the United Provinces had charted a new company, a trading monopoly in the Americas and West Africa: the Dutch West India Company. The Dutch West India Company sought recognition as founders of the New World – which they ultimately did as founders of a new province in 1623, New Netherland. That year, another Fort Nassau was built on the Delaware River near Gloucester City, New Jersey.

In 1624, the first colonists, mostly Walloons and their slaves-bound servants, arrived to New Netherland by the shipload, landing at Governors Island and initially dispensed to Fort Orange, Fort Wilhelmus and Kievits Hoek. In 1626, Director of New Netherland Peter Minuit purchased the island of Manhattan from the Lenape natives and started construction of Fort Amsterdam, which grew to become the main port and capital, New Amsterdam. The colony expanded to outlying areas at Pavonia, Brooklyn, Bronx, and Long Island.

On the Connecticut River, Fort Huys de Goede Hoop was completed in 1633 at present day Hartford. By 1636, the English from Newtown (now Cambridge, Massachusetts) settled on the north side of the Little River. In the Treaty of Hartford, the border of New Netherland was retracted to western Connecticut and by 1653, the English had overtaken the Dutch trading post.

Expansion along the Delaware River beyond Fort Nassau did not begin until the 1650s, after the takeover of a Swedish colony which had been established at Fort Christina in 1638. Settlements at Fort Nassau and the short-lived Fort Beversreede were abandoned and consolidated at Fort Casimir. By 1655 Fort Christina, sitting in what is today Wilmington, had already been renamed Fort Altena.

=== Losses to England ===
In 1664, an English naval expedition sailed into the harbor at New Amsterdam, threatening to attack. Being greatly outnumbered, Director-General Peter Stuyvesant surrendered after negotiating favorable articles of capitulation. The Province then took a new name, New York (from Prince James's English title). Fort Orange was renamed Fort Albany (from James's Scottish title). The region between the lower Hudson and the Delaware was deeded to proprietors and called New Jersey.

The loss of New Netherland led to the Second Anglo–Dutch War during 1665–1667. This conflict ended with the Treaty of Breda, which stipulated that the Dutch give up their claim to New Netherland in exchange for Suriname.

From 1673 to 1674, the territories were once again briefly captured by the Dutch in the Third Anglo–Dutch War, only to be returned to England at the Treaty of Westminster. In 1674, Dutch navy captain Jurriaen Aernoutsz also briefly captured two forts in the French colony of Acadia, which he claimed as Dutch territory the new colony of New Holland. However, Aernoutsz's appointed administrator, John Rhoades, quickly lost control of the territory after Aernoutsz himself left for Curaçao to seek out new settlers, and with effective control of Acadia remaining in the hands of France, Dutch sovereignty existed only on paper until the Netherlands surrendered their claim in the Treaties of Nijmegen.

== Caribbean Sea ==
=== Dutch Caribbean ===
Dutch colonization in the Caribbean started in 1634 on St. Croix and Tobago (1628), followed in 1631 with settlements on Tortuga (now Île Tortue) and Sint Maarten. When the Dutch lost Sint Maarten (and Anguilla where they had built a fort shortly after arriving in Sint Maarten) to the Spanish, they settled Curaçao and Sint Eustatius. They regained half of Sint Maarten in 1648, from then on sharing the island with France. The border between the two portions of the island continued to be modified periodically, before being set permanently in 1816.

- Sint Maarten in 1618
- Bonaire in 1634
- Curaçao in 1634
- Sint Eustatius in 1636
- Aruba in 1637
- Saba in 1640
- Tortola, Virgin Gorda, Jost van Dyke before 1640

Until deep into the 19th century, the now Venezuelan islands of Aves, the Aves archipelago, Los Roques and La Orchila were also considered by the Dutch government to be part of the Dutch West Indies.

The Dutch Caribbean remained an overseas territory of the Netherlands. It was granted self-rule in 1954 as the Netherlands Antilles. In 1969, unrest in Curaçao led to Dutch marines being sent to quell rioting. The 1969 uprising put an end to European-descended dominance in politics and administration in Curaçao, and led to the ascendance of a new African-descended political elite. Nearly all of the governors, prime ministers, and ministers in Curaçao since 1969 have been of African descent. In 1986, Aruba gained its own autonomy after separating from the Netherlands Antilles. On October 10, 2010, the Netherlands Antilles was dissolved. Like Aruba, the islands of Curaçao and Sint Maarten became constituent countries of the Kingdom of the Netherlands. While Bonaire, Saba, and Sint Eustatius became special municipalities (public bodies) of the Netherlands.

=== Tobago ===
The Netherlands made numerous attempts to colonize Tobago (Nieuw-Walcheren) in the 17th century. Each time, the settlements were destroyed by rival European powers. Dutch settlements on Tobago:

- 1628 – 1 Jan 1637: Fort Vlissingen; massacred by the Spanish
- Sept 1654 – Jan 1666: Forts Lampsinsberg, Beveren, and Bellavista; conquered by British, destroyed by French
- 1667 – 18 Dec 1672: Nieuw-Vlissingen; destroyed by British
- 1 Sept 1676 – 6 Dec 1677: Fort Sterreschans; destroyed by French

=== Virgin Islands ===
As a group, the islands are known as the Maagdeneilanden in Dutch. The Dutch established a base on St. Croix (Sint-Kruis) in 1625, the same year that the British did. French Protestants joined the Dutch but conflict with the British colony led to its abandonment before 1650. The Dutch established a settlement on Tortola (Ter Tholen) before 1640 and later on Anegada, Saint Thomas (Sint-Thomas), and Virgin Gorda. The British took Tortola in 1672 and Anegada and Virgin Gorda in 1680.

== South America ==
=== Brazil ===
Map of Dutch Brazil (1630–1654), superimposed on a modern-day map of Brazil

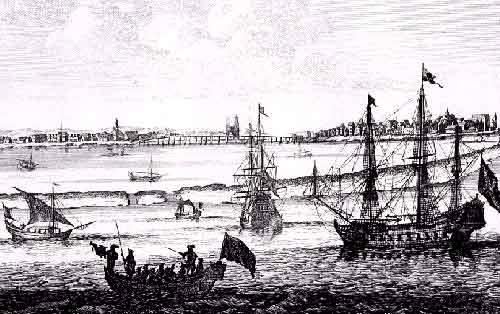
Peter Schenk the Elder, after Frans Post: View of Mauritsstad, engraving, 1645 (Museu Nacional de Belas Artes, Rio de Janeiro)

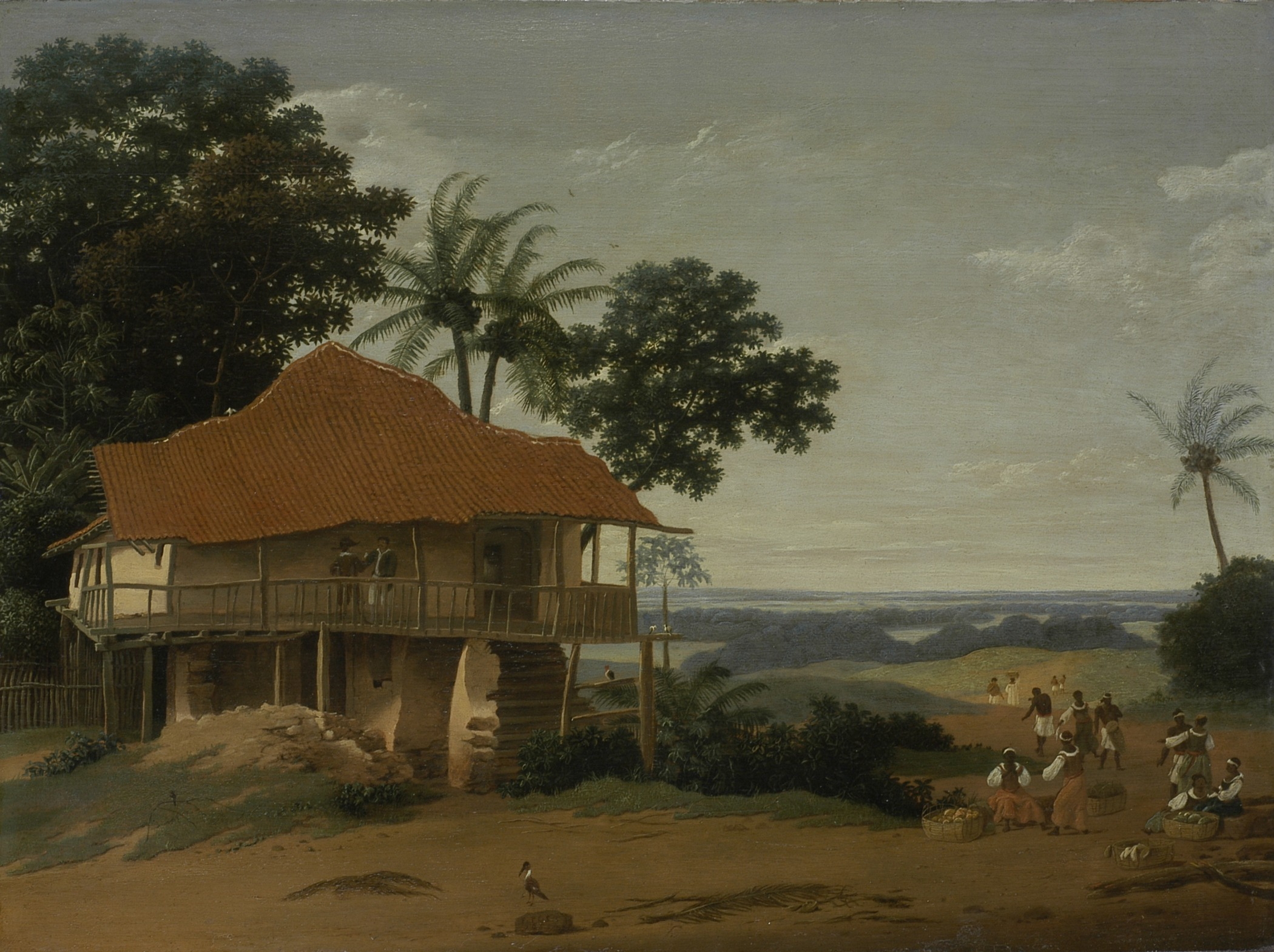
Frans Post: Brazilian Landscape with a Worker's House, c. 1655 (Los Angeles County Museum of Art)

Beginning in 1630, the Dutch Republic gained control of a large portion of northeastern Brazil from the Portuguese. The Dutch West India Company set up their headquarters in Recife; it also exported a tradition of religious tolerance to its New World colonies, most notable to Dutch Brazil. The governor, Johan Maurits, invited artists and scientists in order to help promote migration to the new South-American colony. However, the Portuguese fought back and won a significant victory at the Second Battle of Guararapes in 1649. On 26 January 1654, the Dutch Republic surrendered and signed a capitulation returning control of all the northeastern Brazil colony to the Portuguese. After the end of the First Anglo-Dutch War in May 1654, the Dutch Republic demanded that Nieuw Holland (Dutch Brazil) be returned to Dutch control. Under threat of an occupation of Lisbon and a reoccupation of northeastern Brazil, the Portuguese, already involved in a war against Spain, acceded to the Dutch demand. However, the new Dutch political leader Johan de Witt deemed commerce more important than territory, and saw to it that New Holland was sold back to Portugal on August 6, 1661, through the Treaty of the Hague.

After the devastation caused by World War II, the Dutch government stimulated emigration to Australia, Brazil, and Canada. Brazil was the only nation to allow the arrival of large groups of Catholics. With the consent of the Brazilian government, the Catholic Dutch Farmers and Market-gardeners Union (Dutch: Katholieke Nederlandse Boeren- en Tuindersbond) coordinated the emigration process. A group of approximately 5000 migrants from the province of North Brabant arrived in Brazil, establishing their first colony at the farm of Fazenda Ribeirão in the state of São Paulo. Holambra I was founded in 14 July 1948. After a referendum in 1991 where 98% of the population voted in favor of political autonomy for the area, Holambra gained city status in January 1993.

Famous for its large production of flowers and plants and for the yearly event Expoflora, Holambra receives thousands of tourists each year. In April 1998 this fact was recognized as Holambra gained the status of Estância Turística, touristic location. Further immigration from the Netherlands, ended up creating the cities in Brazil where the majority of the population descends from these Dutch immigrants. These cities are Holambra, Castrolanda, Carambei, Não me Toque, Witmarsum (where most of the population are descended from Dutch Frisian immigrants), Arapoti and Campos de Holambra.

=== Chile ===
In 1600, the Chilean city of Valdivia was captured by the Dutch pirate Sebastian de Cordes. He left the city only after a few months. In 1642, the VOC and WIC sent a fleet to Chile in an attempt to conquer Valdivia and its supposed gold mines. This expedition was led by Hendrik Brouwer, a Dutch admiral. In 1643, Brouwer died before effecting the conquest of the Chiloé Archipelago; his lieutenant Elias Herckmans succeeded in capturing the ruins of the city, which he refortified and named Brouwershaven. Finding no gold but many hostile natives, the Dutch soon abandoned the outpost that would be incorporated into the Spanish Empire.

The second emigration from the Netherlands to Chile was in 1895, when Chile was now independent. Under the so-called "Chilean General Inspector of Colonization and Immigration", a dozen Dutch families settled between 1895 and 1897 in Chiloé, particularly in Mechaico, Huillinco and Chacao. In the same period Hageman Egbert arrived in Chile. with his family, 14 April 1896, settling in Rio Gato, near Puerto Montt. In addition, family Wennekool which inaugurated the Dutch colonization of Villarrica.

In the early twentieth century, there arrived in Chile a large group of Dutch people from South Africa, which had been established where they worked mainly in construction of the railway. When the Boer War, which would eventually lead to the British annexation of both republics in 1902. These emigrants decided to emigrate to Chile with the help of the Chilean government.

On 4 May 1903, a group of over 200 Dutch emigrants sailed on the steamship "Oropesa" shipping company "Pacific Steam Navigation Company, from La Rochelle (La Pallice) in France. The majority of migrants were born in the Netherlands: 35% were from North Holland and South Holland, 13% of North Brabant, 9% of Zeeland and equal number of Gelderland.

On June 5, arrived by train to their final destination, the city of Pitrufquén, located south of Temuco, near the hamlet of Donguil. Another group of Dutchmen arrived shortly after to Talcahuano, in the "Oravi" and the "Orissa". The Netherlands colony in Donguil was christened "New Transvaal Colony. There were established more than 500 families in order to start a new life. Between 7 February 1907 and February 18, 1909, above the last group of families Boers.

It is currently estimated at 50,000 descendants of Dutch, mostly located in Malleco, Gorbea, Pitrufquén, Faja Maisan and around Temuco and Osorno.

=== Guianas ===
The Dutch West Indian Company built a fort in 1616 on the Essequibo River. The Dutch traded with the Indian peoples and, as in Suriname, established sugar plantations worked by African slaves. While the coast remained under Dutch control, the English established plantations west of the Suriname River. Conflict between the two countries meant parts of the region changed hands a number of times, but by 1796 Britain had control of the region. The Netherlands ceded the colonies of Essequibo, Demerara, and Berbice to Britain in 1814.

The colony in Suriname had originally been founded in the 1650s by Lord Francis Willoughby, the British governor of Barbados. It was captured by the Dutch under Abraham Crijnsen during the Second Anglo–Dutch War. On July 31, 1667, under the Treaty of Breda the Dutch offered New Netherland (including New Amsterdam, modern-day New York City) in exchange for their sugar factories on the coast of Suriname. In 1683 Suriname was sold to the Dutch West India Company. The colony developed an agricultural economy based on African slavery. England controlled Suriname during the Napoleonic Wars from 1799 until 1816, when it was returned to the Dutch. The Netherlands abolished slavery in 1863 and later imported indentured labor from the British Raj and the Dutch East Indies to keep the economy going. Internal self governance was granted in 1954 and full independence in 1975. The prospect of independence prompted many to migrate to the Netherlands. Political instability and economic decline after independence resulted in even more migration to the Netherlands. The Surinamese community in the Netherlands is now almost as large as half of the population in the country itself (about 350,000).

== See also ==
- Atlantic World
- Dutch Empire
- Dutch West India Company
- New York history
- New Amsterdam
- New Netherland
- Netherlands Antilles
- New World Dutch barn
