= New Netherland settlements =

Dutch colonial North American settlements

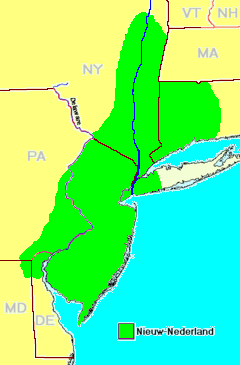
Area settled by the Dutch in 1660

New Netherland (Dutch: Nieuw-Nederland) was the 17th century colonial province of the Republic of the Seven United Netherlands on the northeastern coast of North America. The claimed territory was the land from the Delmarva Peninsula to southern Cape Cod. The settled areas are now part of the Mid-Atlantic states of New York, New Jersey, and Delaware, with small outposts in Connecticut and Pennsylvania. Its capital of New Amsterdam was located at the southern tip of the island of Manhattan on the Upper New York Bay.

The region was initially explored in 1609 by Henry Hudson on an expedition for the Dutch East India Company. It was later surveyed and charted, and was given its name in 1614. The Dutch named the three main rivers of the province the Zuyd Rivier, 'South River' (now the Delaware River), the Noort Rivier, 'North River' (now the Hudson River), and the Versche Rivier, 'Fresh River' (now the Connecticut River). They intended to use them to gain access to the interior, the indigenous population, and the lucrative fur trade.

International law required discovery, charting, and settlement to perfect a territorial claim. Large scale settlement was rejected in favor of a formula that was working in Asia of establishing factories (trading posts with a military presence and a small support community). This period is sometimes referred to as the Dutch Golden Age, despite on-going wars on the European continent, and it was difficult to recruit people to leave the economic boom and cultural vibrancy of Europe. Mismanagement and under-funding by the Dutch West India Company (WIC) hindered early settlement, as well as misunderstandings and armed conflict with Indians. Liberalization of trade, a degree of self-rule, and the loss of Dutch Brazil led to exponential growth in the 1650s. Transfers of power from the Netherlands to England were peaceful in the province, the last one formalized in 1674.

== Forts and Factorijen ==
The first of two Forts Nassau was built in Mahican territory during the first decade, where commerce could be conducted with Indians, and factorijen (small trading posts) went up at Schenectady, Schoharie, Esopus, Quinnipiac, Communipaw, Ninigret, Totoket, Schuykill, and elsewhere. Trapper Jan Rodrigues is believed to have been the first non-Indian to winter on the island of Manhattan in 1613.

== Nut Island ==
The States General of the Dutch Republic awarded the newly formed Dutch West India Company a trade monopoly for the region in 1621, and New Netherland became a province of the Dutch Republic in 1624. The South River was initially chosen as the site of the capital because the colonists felt that it had the best climate. However, summer humidity, mosquitos, and winter freezing made the North River more appealing. A number of ships brought settlers to the New World, at first to Noten Island (Old Dutch: Noten Eylandt, lit. 'Nut island') and soon after to the tip of Manhattan, and the colonists began construction of Fort Amsterdam, around which the colony began to grow. Small groups of the early arrivals were dispersed to Fort Orange, to Fort Wilhelmus, or to Kievets Hoek, but those who went to Fort Wilhelmus and Kievets Hoek were later recalled. Among those who made the crossing were many Walloons and 11 Africans as company-owned slaves.

== Patroonships ==
In 1629, the Dutch West India Company introduced the Charter of Freedoms and Exemptions, a series of inducements commonly known as the patroon system. Invested members could receive vast land patents and manorial rights, somewhat reminiscent of a feudal lord, if they were willing to fulfill certain conditions, including transporting and settling at least 50 persons. A number of attempts were made, but the only notable success was the Manor of Rensselaerswyck. Pavonia, across the river from New Amsterdam, was returned to the company and became a company-managed holding. In 1640, company policy was changed to allow land purchases by individuals in good standing.

== South River ==
Another patroon patent was Zwaanendael Colony later named by the British, Lewes, Delaware (the town is still known as such), the first Dutch colonial settlement on the South River (Delaware Bay), but it was plundered soon after its founding in 1631. After 1638, settlement was mostly in New Sweden, and these were brought under New Netherland control in 1655 when Fort Casimir was built. In 1663, Pieter Corneliszoon Plockhoy attempted to create a utopian settlement in the region, but it expired under English rule.

== Fresh River (Connecticut) ==
The Dutch established a short-lived factorij trading post at Kievits Hoek (or Plover's Corner) in present-day Old Saybrook, Connecticut, shortly after constructing their first settlement on the island of Manhattan. They abandoned it soon after, however, in order to focus on the trading post at Fort Goede Hoop on the Connecticut River, which was completed in 1633. The Dutch also had a trading post and possible fort at the mouth of the Branford River in Branford, Connecticut, which still contains a wharf called "Dutch Wharf." Soon after, settlers from the Massachusetts Bay Colony formed the Connecticut Colony in 1636, and the New Haven Colony in 1638. Petrus Stuyvesant attempted to prevent further competition for the area and agreed to a border 50 miles west of the river in the Treaty of Hartford (1650). This did not stem the flow of New Englanders to Long Island and the mainland along Long Island Sound, however.

== North River ==
The port called the Manhattans grew up at the mouth of the North River (Hudson River). New Amsterdam was the capital of the province and received its municipal charter in 1652; this included the isle of Manhattan, Staaten Eylandt, Pavonia, and the Lange Eylandt towns, including Gravesend, Breuckelen, and Nieuw Amersfoort.

A municipal charter was also granted to Beverwijck in 1652, which had grown from a trading post to a bustling town in the midst of Rensselaerswyck. In 1657, the homesteads scattered along the west bank of the Hudson Valley in Esopus country were required to build a garrison that became the province's third largest town of Wiltwijk.

== The Dutch Belt ==
Colonial settlers spread throughout the region after the final transfer of power to the English with the Treaty of Westminster (1674), establishing many of the towns and cities that exist today. The Dutch Reformed Church played an important role in this expansion. Settlers followed the course of the Hudson River in the north via New York Harbor to the Raritan River in the south along what George Washington called the "Dutch Belt".

== Demographics ==
Population estimates do not include Native Americans.

- 1628: 270
- 1630: 300
- 1640: 500
- 1650: 800 -1,000
- 1664: 9,000

== List of settlements ==
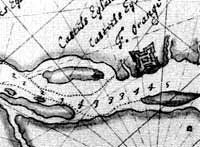
(c. 1629) Fort Orange and Castle Island

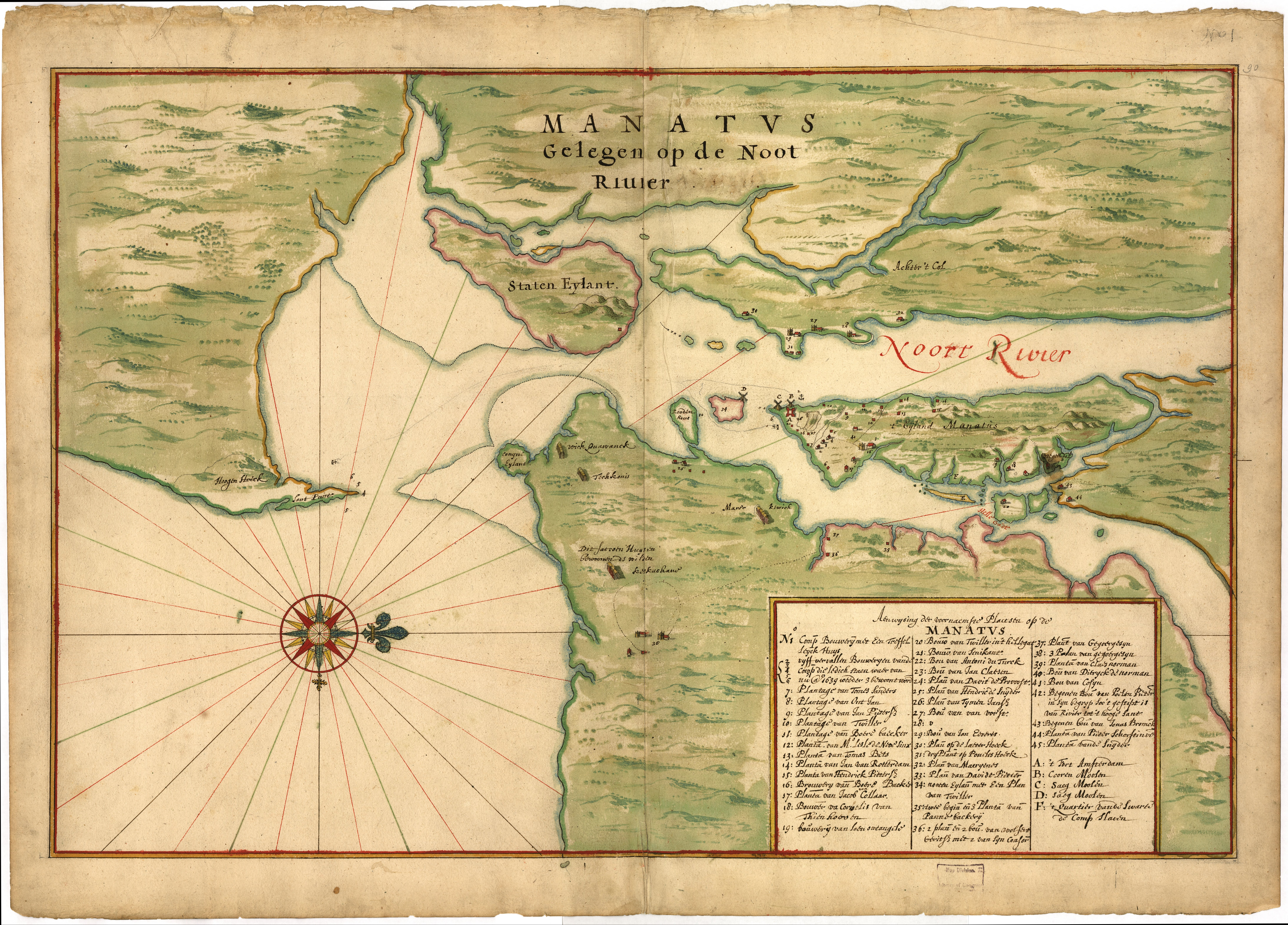
Manatus Map (c. 1639) Manhattan situated on the North Rivier

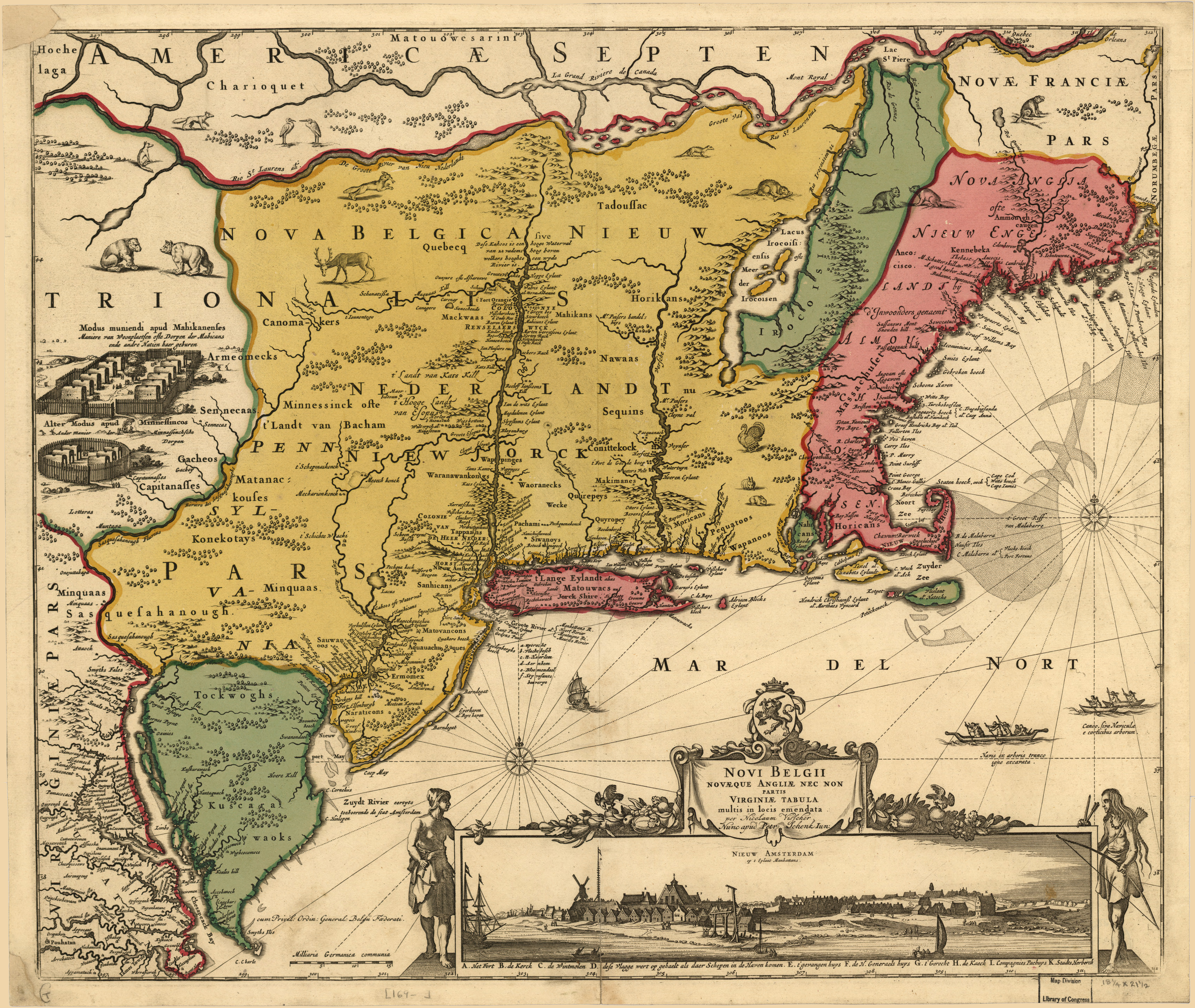
(c. 1650) (1685 reprint) New Netherland

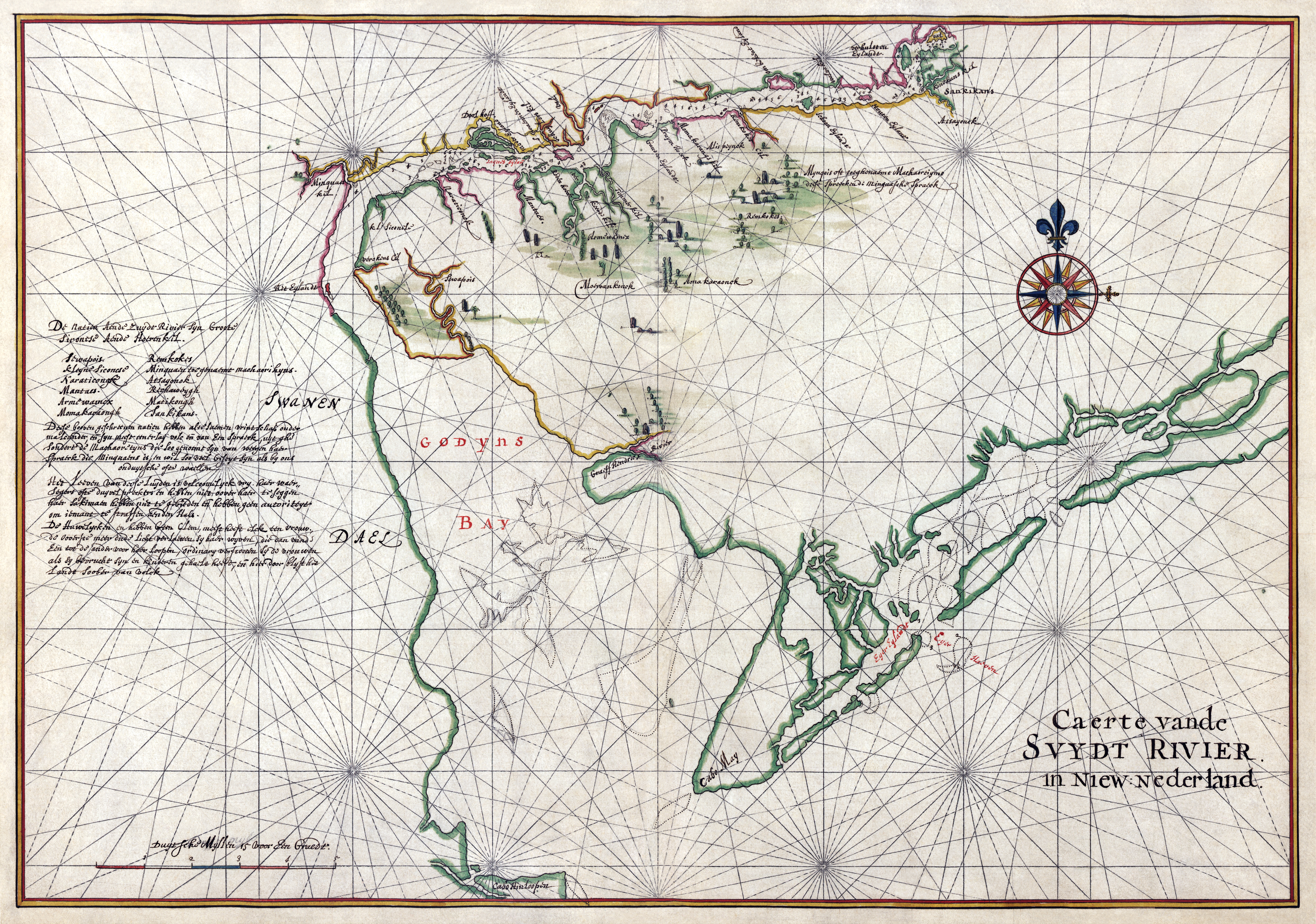
Nautical chart of Zwaanendael, 1639

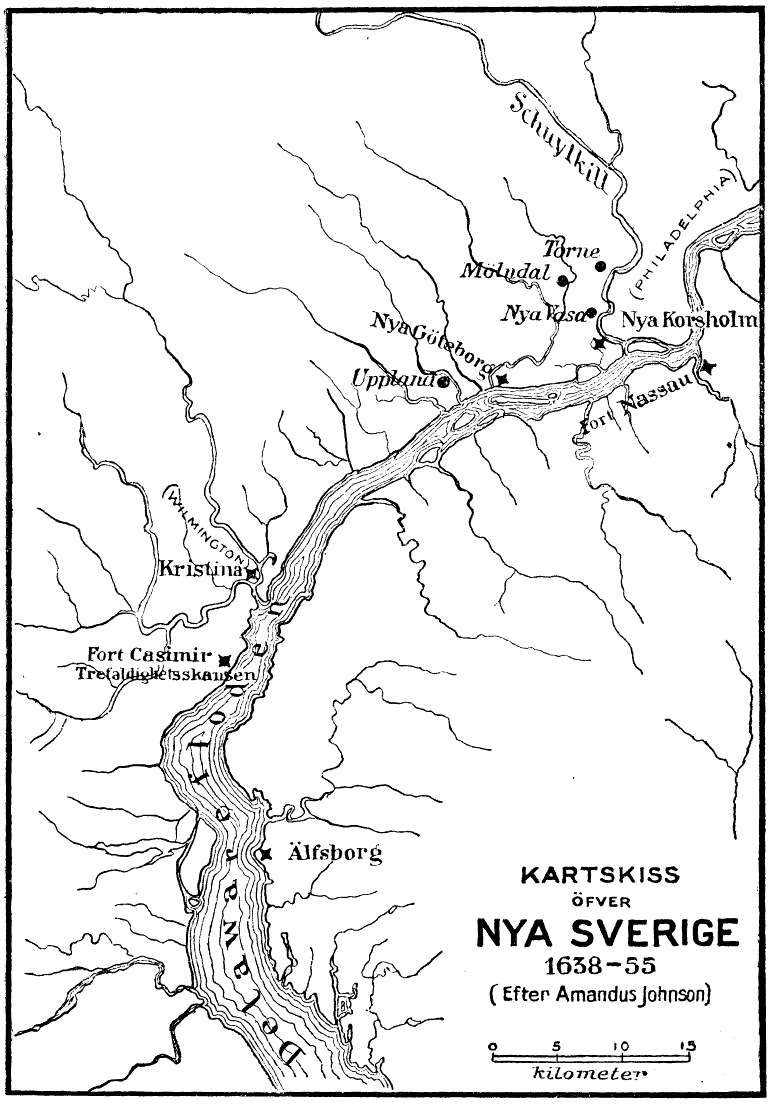
(c. 1650) South River

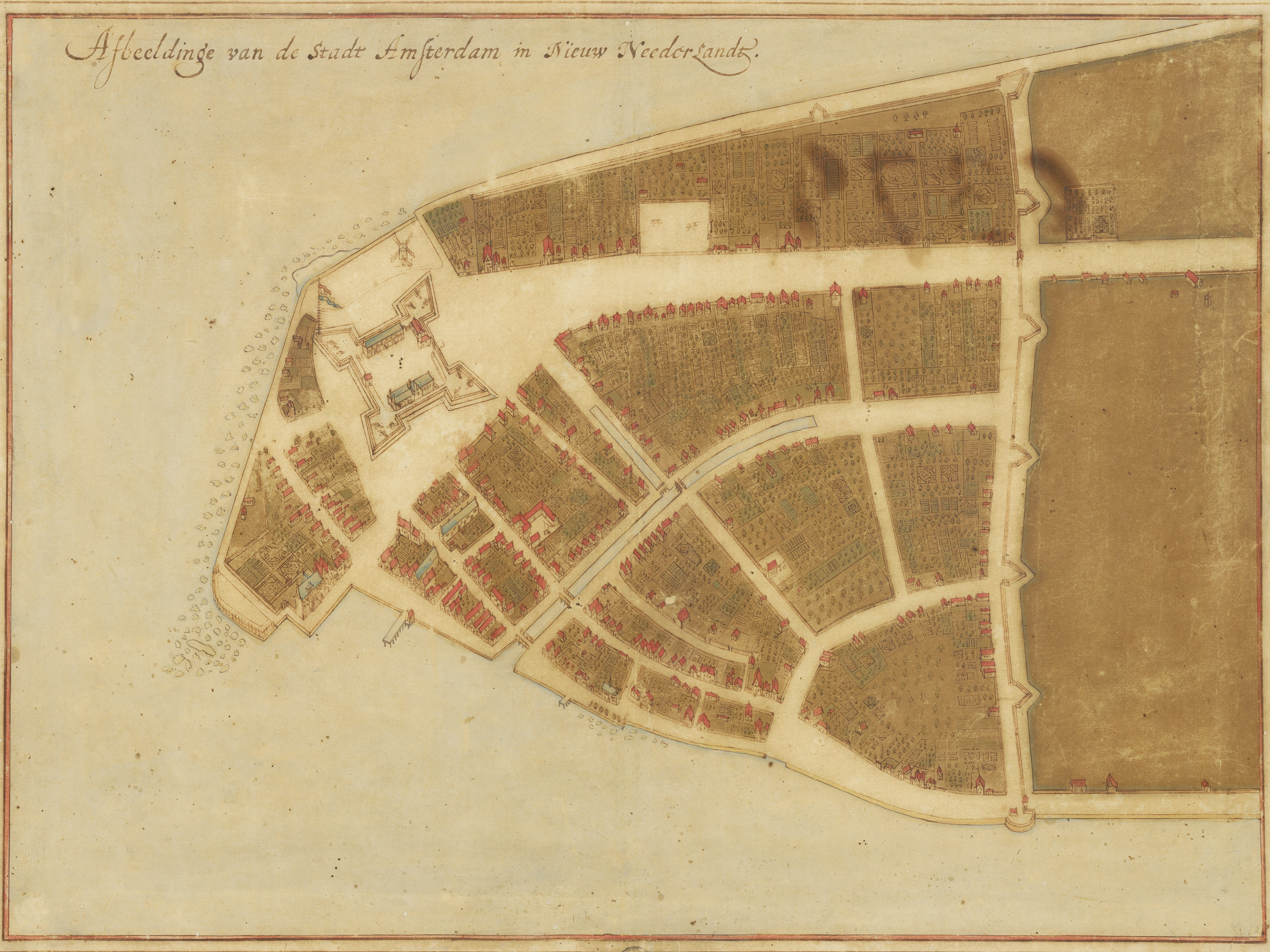
(1660) New Amsterdam

Settlements of New Netherland
Name	Modern-day location	State	Year estd.	Notes/references
Fort Nassau	Castle Island	NY	1614	in the North River
Roduins / Rodenbergh	New Haven	CT	possibly 1620s	possible factorij
Fort Nassau	Gloucester City	NJ	1621	dismantled and relocated in 1651
Noten Eylant	Governors Island	NY	1624	
Fort Orange	Albany	NY	1624	replaced Fort Nassau on the North River
Fort Wilhelmus	Burlington Island	NJ	1624	disbanded
Kievets Hoek	Old Saybrook	CT	1624	disbanded
New Amsterdam	Lower Manhattan	NY	1624	
Fort Amsterdam	Lower Manhattan	NY	1625	
Rensselaerswyck	Capital District	NY	1630	patroonship of Kiliaen van Rensselaer on the North River
Pavonia	Hudson County	NJ	1630	on the North River; attempted patroonship of Michael Pauw
Noortwijk	Greenwich Village, New York	NY	1630s	
Zwaanendael	Lewes	DE	1631	on the Zuyd Rivier; soon after plundered by the local population
Fort Huis de Goed Hoop	Hartford	CT	1633	near the Fresh River
Jan de Lacher's Hoeck	Communipaw / Liberty State Park	NJ	1634	
Connecticut Colony	–	CT	1636	founded by New Englanders near Fort Huis de Goed Hoop
Quetenesse	Dutch Island	RI	1636	nearby Fort Ninigret may have been Dutch or Portuguese
Nieuwe Haarlem	Harlem, New York	NY	1637	municipal charter in 1652
Pelham	Pelham	NY	1637	New Englander's homestead
New Haven Colony	New Haven	CT	1638	New Englander towns found at mouth of Quinnipiac River
Fort Christina	Wilmington	DE	1638	first of Swedish settlements on the Zuyd Rivier; Fort Altena in 1655
Broncks	The Bronx	NY	1639	settled by Jonas Bronck
Paulus Hoeck	Paulus Hook	NJ	1639	patent at Pavonia
Staaten Eylandt	Staten Island	NY	1639	attempted patroonship of Cornelius Meyln
Southhold	Southhold	NY	1640	
Vriessendael	Edgewater	NJ	1640	homestead of David Pietersen de Vries
Beverwijck	Albany	NY	1640s	trading post surrounded by Rensselaerswyck; municipal charter in 1652
Peekskill	Peekskill	NY	possibly early 1640s	formalized in 1684
Achter Col	Gateway Region	NJ	1641	attempted patroonship on the Hackensack River
Greenwich	Greenwich	CT	1642	English manor under Dutch jurisdiction
Vriedelandt	Throggs Neck, Bronx	NY	1642	settled by Englishman John Throckmorton
Maspat	Maspeth, Queens	NY	1642	under a charter granted to Rev. Francis Doughty
Hemsteede	Hempstead	NY	1643	New England settlement on Lange Eylandt
Hoboken	Hoboken	NJ	1643	lease at Pavonia
Eastchester	Eastchester	NY	1643	homestead of Anne Hutchinson's family and followers
Gravesend	Gravesend, Brooklyn	NY	1645	settled under Dutch patent by English Anabaptist Lady Deborah Moody and followers
Vlissingen	Flushing, Queens	NY	1645	under Dutch patent, mostly English colonists, many of them Quakers
Breuckelen	Brooklyn Heights, Brooklyn	NY	1646	
Colen Donck	Yonkers	NY	1646	homestead of Jonkheer Adriaen van der Donck
Constable Hook	Constable Hook	NJ	1646	patent
Nieuw Amersfoort	Flatlands, Brooklyn	NY	1647	
Minkakwa	Caven Point	NJ	1647	
Weehawken	Weehawken	NJ	1647	land patent
Fort Beversreede	Philadelphia	PA	1648	on the Schuylkill River
Stuyvesant Farm	East Village and Stuyvesant Town, New York	NY	1649	homestead of Petrus Stuyvesant
Poughkeepsie	Poughkeepsie	NY	1650s	founded by Barent Baltus
Fort Casimir	New Castle	DE	1651	
Midwout	Midwood, Brooklyn	NY	1652	
Esopus	Ulster County	NY	1652	
Nieuw Utrecht	Bensonhurst, Brooklyn	NY	1652	
Oester Baai	Oyster Bay	NY	1653	at the 1650 border between New Netherland and New England
Pelham Manor	Pelham	NY	1654	Englishman Thomas Pell's purchase; New Netherland/Siwanoy territory
Pamrapo	Bayonne	NJ	1654	Achter Col patents
Nieuw Amstel	New Castle	DE	1655	
Rustdorp	Jamaica, Queens	NY	1656	land patent
Wiltwyk	Kingston	NY	1657	
Bergen	Hudson County	NJ	1660	
Rye	Rye	NY	1660	land purchase by English settlers
Oude Dorpe	Old Town, Staten Island	NY	1661	
Boswijck	Bushwick, Brooklyn	NY	1661	
Schenectady	Schenectady	NY	1661	
Claverack	Hudson	NY	1662	
Plockhoy Zwaanendael	Lewes, Delaware	DE	1663	founded by Pieter Corneliszoon Plockhoy
English Neighborhood	eastern Bergen County	NJ	1668	
Woestina	Rotterdam	NY	1670	
Nieuw Dorp	New Dorp, Staten Island	NY	1671	

== Reformed Congregations pre-1776 (selection) ==
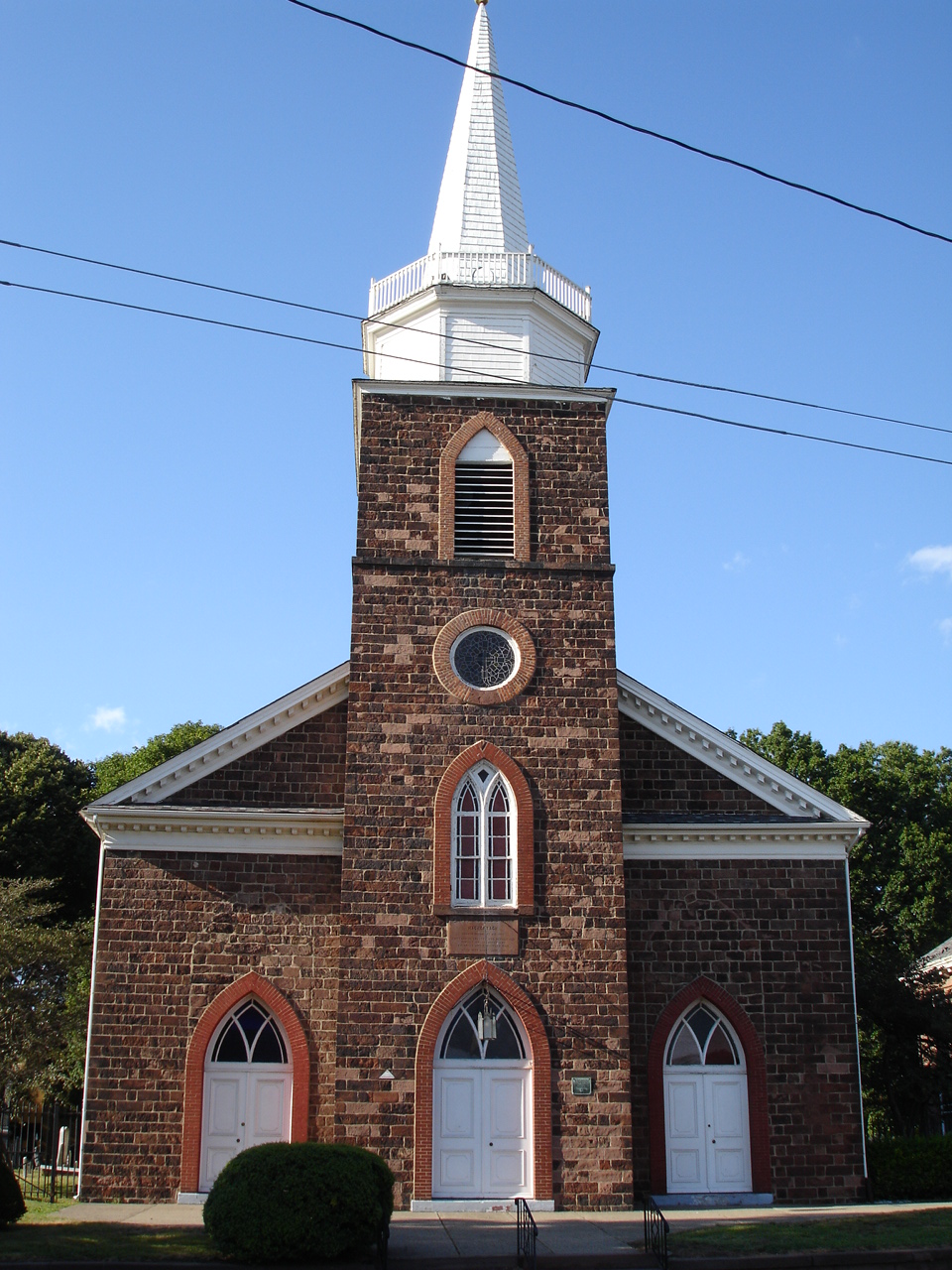
Hackensack

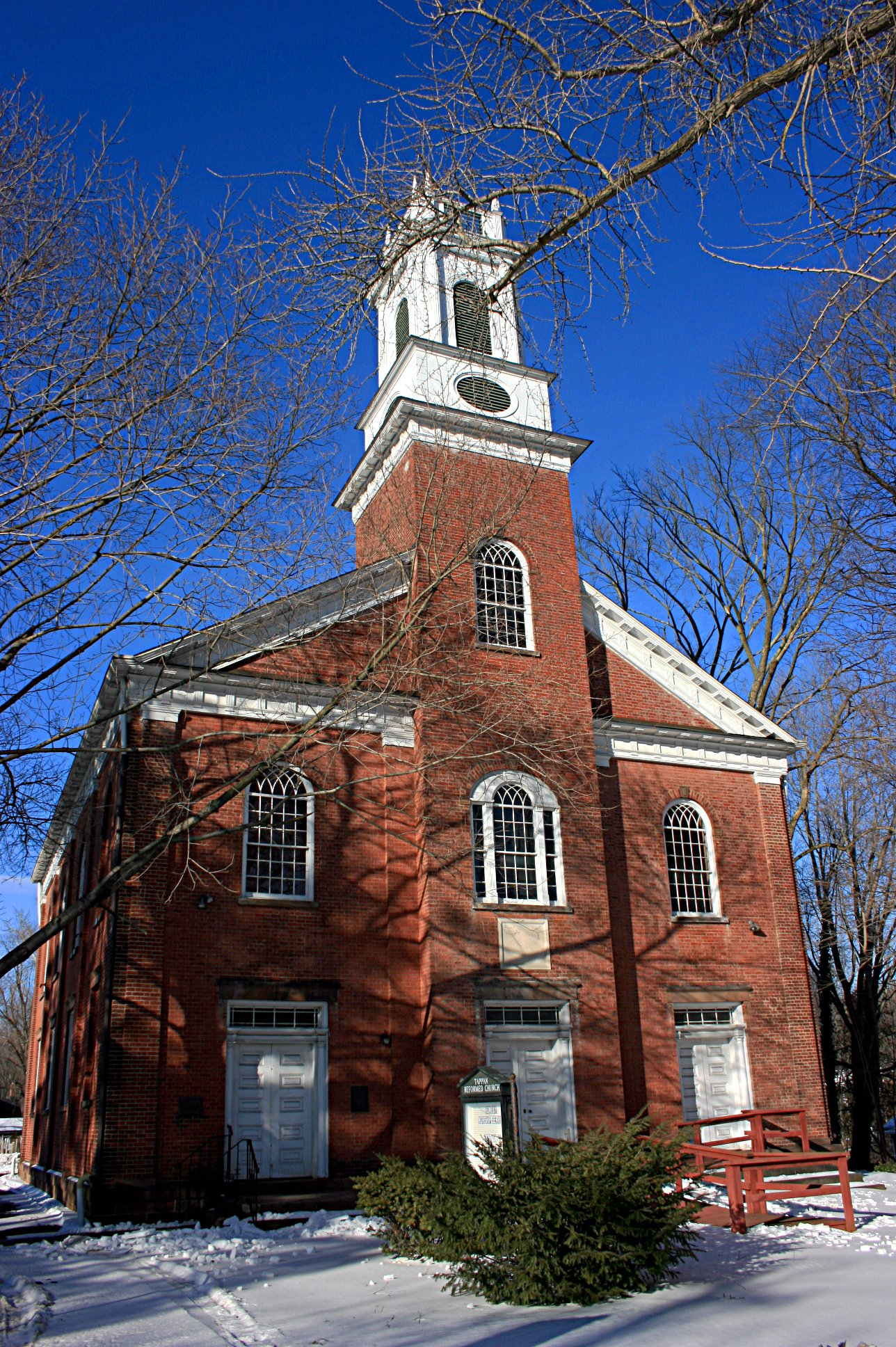
Tappan

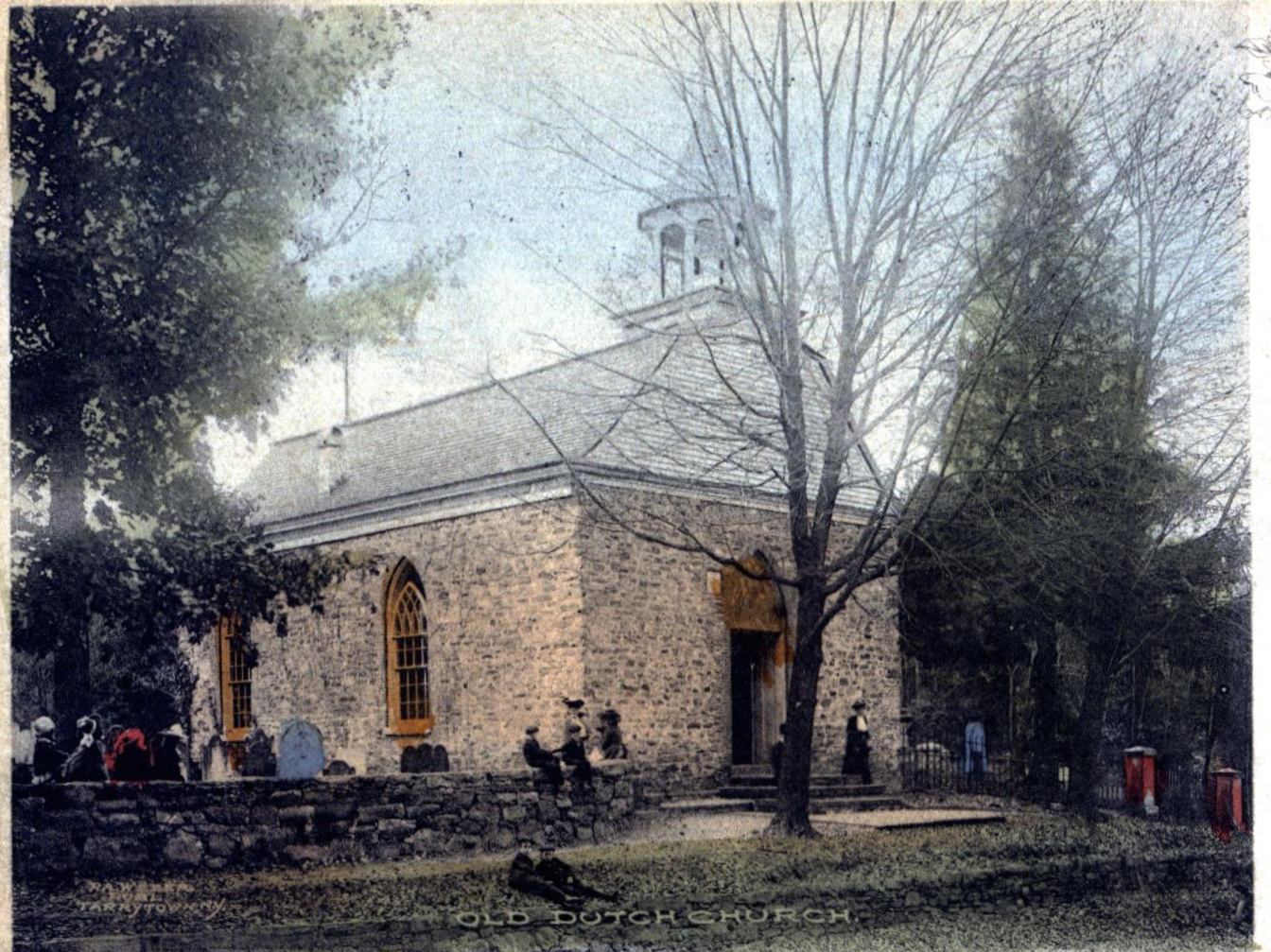
Sleepy Hollow

- 1683 - New Pfaltz (Huguenot)
- 1684 - Sleepy Hollow
- 1686 - Hackensack
- 1693 - Acquackanonk in Passaic
- 1694 - Tappan
- 1699 - Brick in Marlboro
- 1700 - Second River in Belleville
- 1703 - Six Mile Run
- 1710 - Ponds in Oakland
- 1716 - Claverack
- 1716 - Fishkill
- 1716 - Poughkeepsie
- 1717 - New Brunswick
- 1717 - Schaghticoke
- 1719 - North Branch
- 1720 - Fairfield
- 1723 - Herkimer (German Palatines)
- 1724 - Schraalenburgh now Dumont
- 1725 - Paramus
- 1725 - Stone Arabia in Palatine (German Palatines)
- 1727 - Harlingen
- 1731 - Rhinebeck
- 1736 - Pompton Plains
- 1740 - Ramapo in Mahwah
- 1750 - Canajoharie
- 1750 - Clarkstown
- 1755 - Totowa in Paterson
- 1756 - Schodack
- 1756 - Montvlle
- 1758 - Caughnawaga now Fonda
- 1758 - New Hackensack in Town of Wappinger
- 1758 - Bedminster
- 1763 - Betlehem
- 1765 - Ghent
- 1770 - English Neighborhood, now Ridgefield
- 1774 - Kakiat now West New Hempstead
- 1776 - Hillsdale

== See also ==
- Toponymy of New Netherland
- New Netherlander
- Reformed Church in America
- New Brunswick Theological Seminary
- Forts of New Netherland
- Huguenot Street Historic District
- German Palatines
- History of Brooklyn
- List of Dutch West India Company trading posts and settlements

== Sources ==
- Thematic Survey of Dutch Heritage Resources in the Greater Hudson Valley
- Dutch Reformed Church Records
- History of Dutch Reformed Church
- Colonial Maps
- Jacobs, Jaap (2005). New Netherland: A Dutch Colony In Seventeenth-Century America. BRILL. ISBN 90-04-12906-5.
- NNL chronology
