= Fortifications of New Netherland =

The Seal of New Netherland

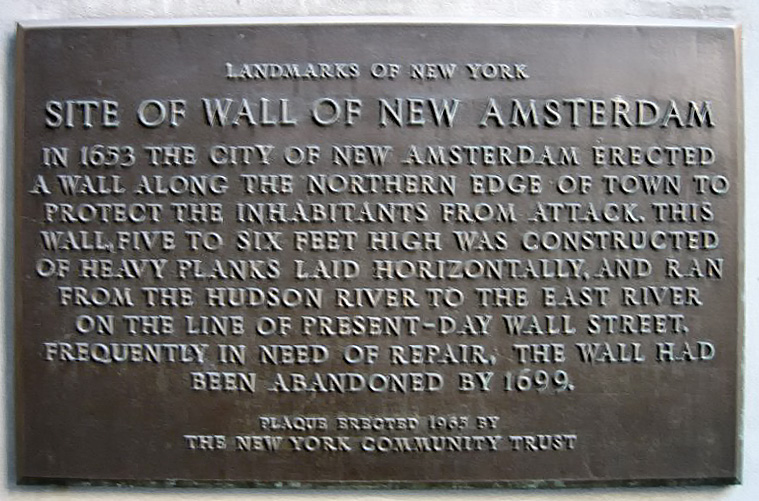
Wall Street plaque erected 1963 | "In 1653 the city of New Amsterdam erected a wall along the northern edge of town to protect the inhabitants from attack. This wall, five to six feet high, was constructed of heavy planks laid horizontally and ran from the Hudson River to the East River on the line of present-day Wall Street. Frequently in need of repair the wall was abandoned by 1699."

New Netherland, or Nieuw-Nederland in Dutch, was the 17th century colony of the Republic of the Seven United Netherlands on the northeastern coast of North America. The claimed territory included southern Cape Cod to parts of the Delmarva Peninsula. Settled areas are now part of the Mid-Atlantic states of New York, New Jersey, Connecticut, Delaware and Pennsylvania. Its capital, New Amsterdam, was located at the southern tip of the island of Manhattan on Upper New York Bay.

Explored in 1609 by Henry Hudson while sailing on an expedition for the Dutch East India Company, the region was later surveyed, charted and given its name in 1614. The Dutch named the three main rivers of the province the Zuyd Rivier or "South River", the Noort Rivier or "North River", and the Versche Rivier or "Fresh River", and intended to use them to gain access to the interior, to the Native Americans and to the lucrative fur trade.

International law required not only discovery and a charter, but also the founding of forts and villages to confirm a territorial claim. Large-scale settlements were rejected by the Dutch in favor of the factorijen, a trading post with soldiers and a small group of settlers. During the first decade the New Netherland Company built Fort Nassau in Mahican/Mohawk territory on the North River. Among the places it is believed factorijen were set up are Schenectady, Schoharie, Esopus, Manhattan, Communipaw, Roodenburg, and Ninigret.

The Dutch West India Company (WIC) was granted a charter by the Republic of the Seven United Netherlands on June 3, 1621, forming a joint venture to exploit trade in New Netherland. The first settlers landed on Noten Island in 1624 and began the fortification and population of the colony. The names Fort Nassau and Fort Orange were used by the Dutch in the 17th century for several fortifications around the world in honor of the House of Orange-Nassau.

New Sweden was first settled in 1637 on territory claimed by the Dutch Republic, which was unable to prevent the incursion and did not officially recognize the colony. It was brought under Dutch control in a military expedition led by Director-General of New Netherland Peter Stuyvesant in 1655. In that year the government enacted regulations requiring settlers throughout the province to construct stockades to which they could withdraw if attacked, the most extensive being at Wiltwyck.

== Dutch forts ==
- Fort Nassau (1614), on the North River (at Albany, New York), lost to floods
- Fort Orange (1624), Castle Island in the North River (at Albany, New York)
- Fort Amsterdam (1625), the Manhattoes harbor at the mouth of the North River (at the site of Alexander Hamilton U.S. Custom House in southern Manhattan)
- Fort Wilhelmus (1625), on the South River (at Burlington Island, New Jersey), soon abandoned
- Fort Nassau (c. 1627), near the South River (at Gloucester City, New Jersey), relocated 1651, becoming Fort Casimir
- Fort Huis de Goede Hoop (1633), on the Park River near the Fresh River (at Hartford, Connecticut)
- Fort Casimir (1651), on the South River (at New Castle, Delaware), briefly known as Fort Trefaldigheets (1654–1655) and later New Amstel
- Fort Beversreede (1651), on the Schuylkill River (at Southwest Philadelphia) near the South River
- Fort Altena (1655), the name given to Fort Christina (at Wilmington)

== Swedish forts ==
- Fort Christina (1638) - at the Brandywine Creek and Christina River in Wilmington, Delaware, later renamed Fort Altena (1655)
- Fort Mecoponacka (1641) - in Chester, near Finlandia or Upland in Delaware County, Pennsylvania
- Fort Nya Elfsborg (1643) - between present-day Salem Creek and Alloway Creek near Bridgeport, New Jersey
- Fort Nya Gothenborg (1643) - on Tinicum Island near the site of The Printzhof in Essington, Delaware County, Pennsylvania
- Fort Nya Vasa (1646) - at Kingsessing, on the eastern-side of Cobbs Creek in Philadelphia
- Fort Nya Korsholm (1647) - on the Schuylkill River near the South River in Philadelphia

== Other fortifications ==
- Noten Eylandt (1624), now Governors Island in New York Harbor
- Fort Ninigret (c.1637), on the mainland north of Block Island in Rhode Island
- Roodenburg (c.16??), possibly a fort or factorij at the mouth of the Quinnipiac River
- De Wal (1653), a wooden palisade or rampart, now Wall Street
- The Rondout (1657) at Rondout, New York near the North River, at Wiltwyck
- Fort Bergen, (1661) atop Bergen Hill, part of the Palisades in New Jersey
- Gravesend, Brooklyn

== See also ==
- Fort Pentagouet
- New Netherland
- New Netherland settlements
- New Sweden
- Zwaanendael Colony
