= Joseph Poncet =

French Jesuit missionary (1610–1675)

Joseph Anthony de la Rivière Poncet (b. at Paris, 17 May 1610; d. at Martinique, 18 June 1675) was a French Jesuit missionary to Canada.

== Life ==
Poncet was born in Paris in 1610. His father was a member of the Company of One Hundred Associates chartered to trade in New France. Poncet entered the Jesuit novitiate in Paris at nineteen, as a student in rhetoric and philosophy. He pursued his studies at Rouen, and taught at Orléans (1631-4). Then he began his theological studies at Clermont, completing them at Rome.

While at Orleans, he met the son of the widow Marie Guyart. In 1638 he put her in touch with Madame de la Pettrie. Both accompanied him to New France the following year. Poncet arrived in Quebec in early August 1639 and was immediately sent to the Wendat (Huron) mission, where he spent a year before returning to Quebec, after which he went to Trois-Rivières. In July 1643 he was a parish priest in Montreal.

While serving at the mission of Sainte-Marie in Huronia, in 1648 Poncet was sent to establish the mission of St. Pierre at Wiikwemkoong on the "Isle de Ste-Marie". In August 1653, after returning to Quebec he was captured at Cap-Rouge by the Haudenosaunee while attempting to get some persons to cut the harvest of a poor widow. He lost the index finger of his left hand due to torture, but was then adopted by an old woman in place of a relative that had been killed. His companion, Mathurin Franchelot, was burned at the stake. Towards October, Poncet was brought to Montreal, by way of Fort Orange, in a prisoner exchange.

Although Johannes Dyckman, commissary at Fort Orange treated him coldly, an elderly Walloon offered him hospitality, while others provided him with clothes, and a Scotch matron sent a surgeon to tend his wounds. A young Frenchman in the settlement served as interpreter. He was conveyed by way of Oswego to Lake Ontario and down the St. Lawrence to Quebec.

At the request of his superior François Le Mercier, Poncet wrote an account of his experience. The Dictionary of Canadian Biography describes Poncet as "an unreliable and capricious character". In 1657, he became involved in ecclesiastical jurisdictional disputes and asked to return to France. He held the position of French penitentiary at Loreto, and was later sent to the Island of Martinique, where he died at the age of sixty-five.

"Father Poncet had an attractive personality, and did not lack talent, virtues, or zeal, although his suspicious and irritable character made him unhappy and difficult to handle."
