= Fort Nassau =

Fort Nassau may refer to:

- Fort Nassau (North River), established 1614 in Albany, New York
- Fort Nassau (South River), established 1623 in Gloucester City, New Jersey
- Old Fort of Nassau, established 1697, in The Bahamas, which, as a British fort, was attacked by U.S. Marines in 1776
- Fort Nassau (Ghana), established near Mori
- Fort Nassau (Guyana), on the Berbice River
- Fort Nassau, Banda Islands, on the island of Bandaneira, in Indonesia, constructed in 1609
- Fort Nassau (Curaçao), established as Fort Republiek in 1797

== See also ==
- Nassau (disambiguation)
