= Fort Beversreede =

Coordinates: 39°53′53″N 75°12′42″W

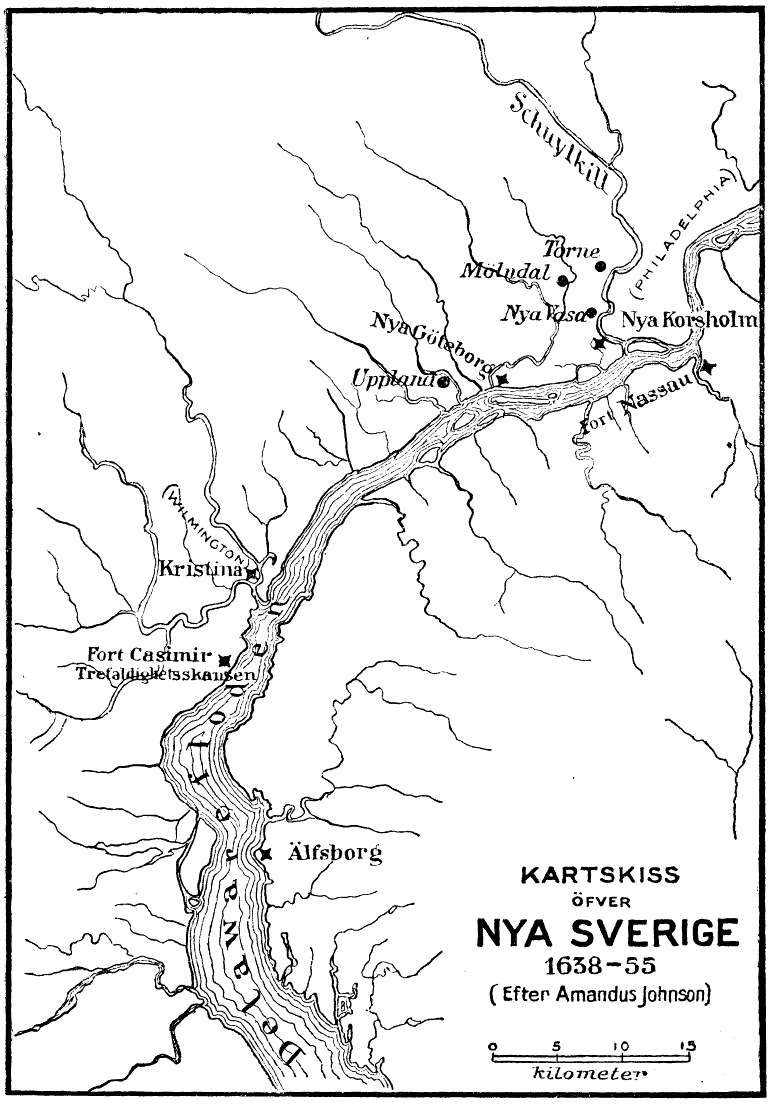
Forts along the Delaware River in the 1600s. Short-lived Beversreede was supplanted by Fort Nya Korsholm (upper right)

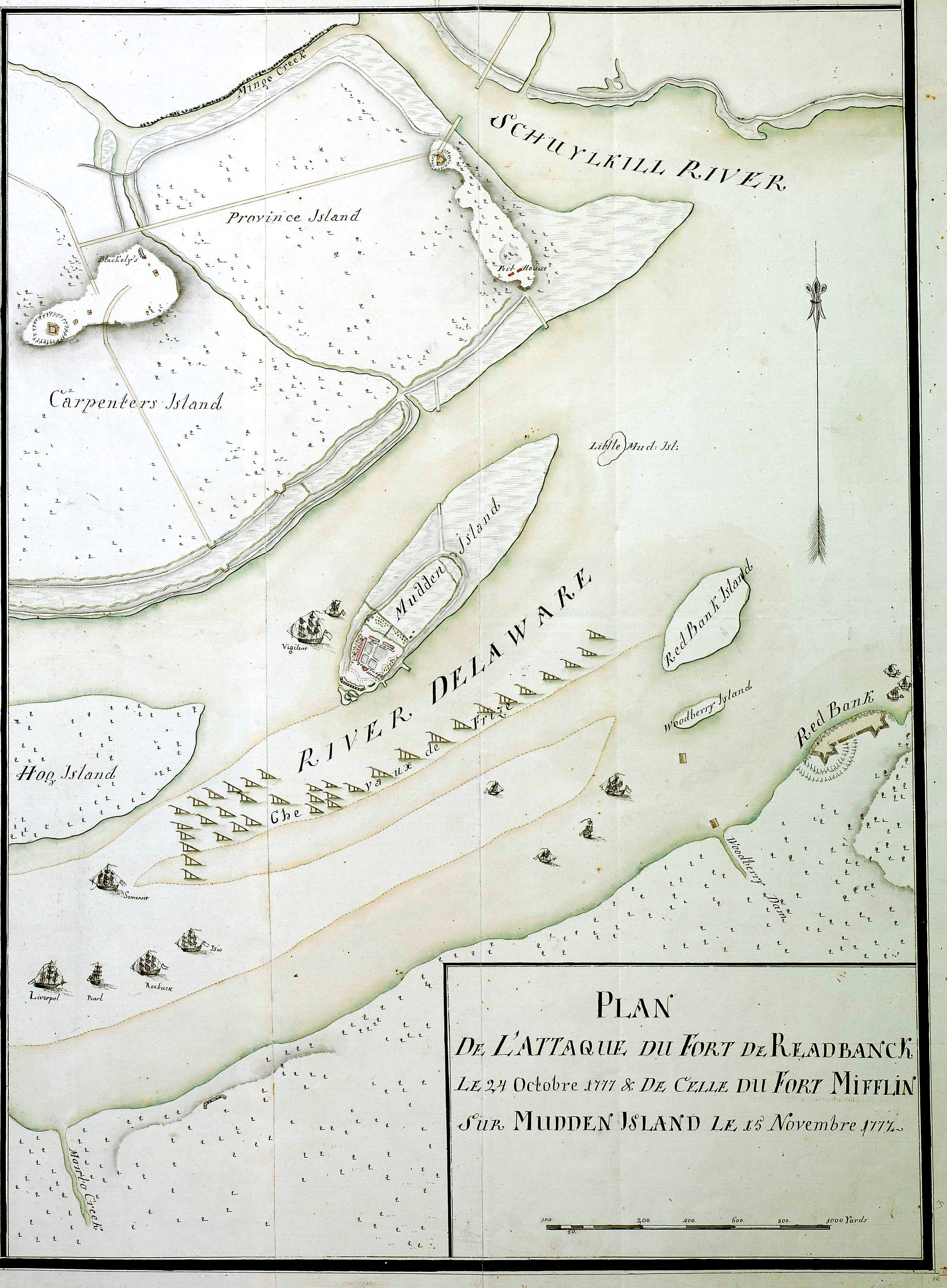
A 1770s map showing a fort on Province Island (top)

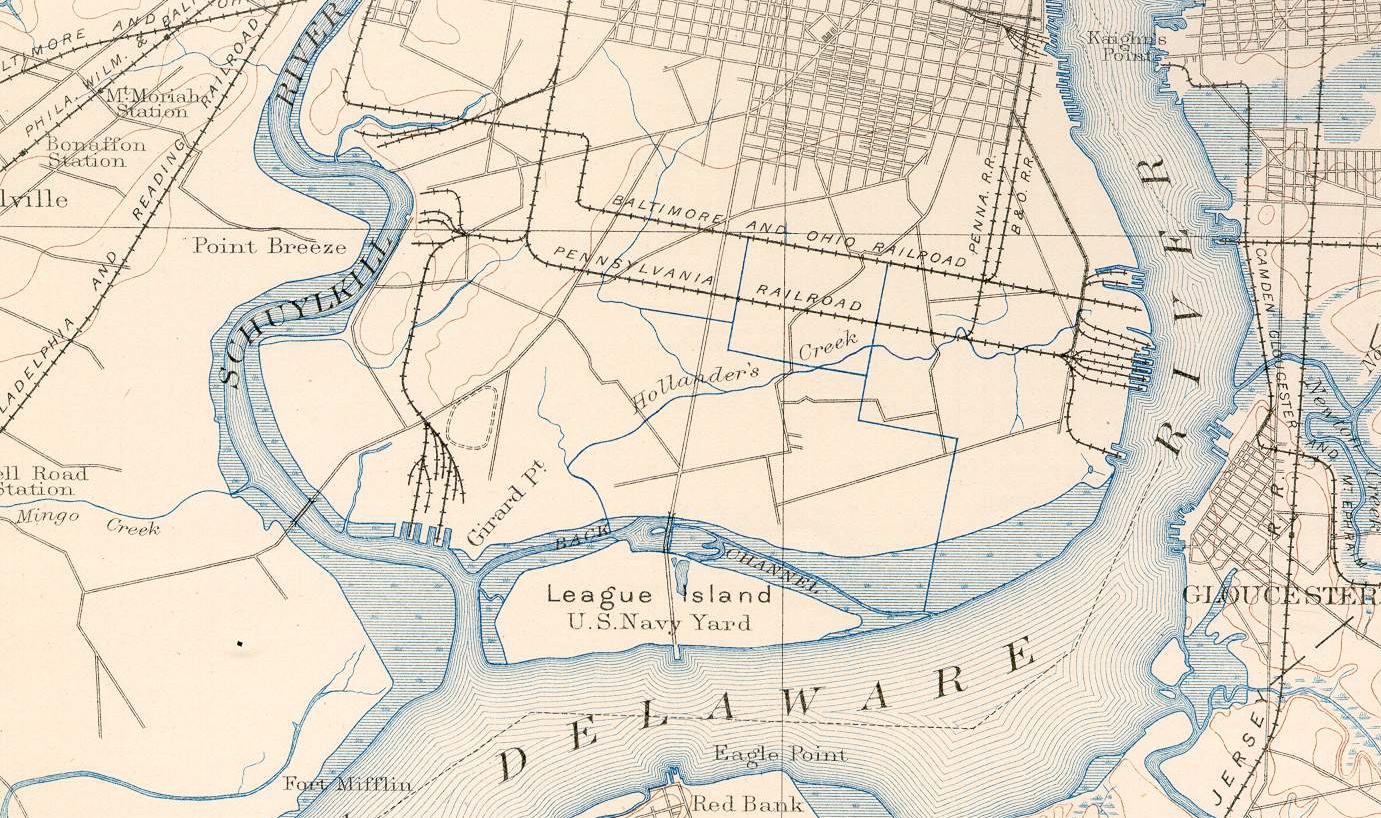
An 1891 map showing the confluence of the Schuylkill and Delaware Rivers, site of most upstream Dutch and Swedish forts

Fort Beversreede (after 1633–1651) was a Dutch-built palisaded factorij located near the confluence of the Schuylkill River and the Delaware River. It was an outpost of the colony of New Netherland, which was centered on its capital, New Amsterdam in present-day Manhattan, New York City, on the North River, now the Hudson River.

== Location ==
A 1655 Swedish map shows the fort on the west bank of the Schuylkill River, on Providence Island, just south of Minquas, also known as Eagle's Nest or Mingo Creek. Scharf & Westcott put it on the east bank of the Schuylkill River, opposite Minquas Creek. A 1770s map of Philadelphia's naval defenses shows a fort on the island, but it is unidentified.

Directly adjacent to (or opposite) the fort was the terminus of the Great Minquas Path, an 80-mile (130 km) trail from the Susquehanna River to the Schuylkill River. This was the primary trade route for furs from the Susquehannock people, and the Dutch named the trail "Beversreede" or "Beaver Road."

== Swedes ==
Though never recognized by the Dutch, the Delaware Valley region was effectively under control of the Swedish colony of New Sweden, which was first settled in 1638 at Fort Christina (now Wilmington, Delaware). Though the Swedes' colony included Dutch residents, the only official Dutch presence in the area was across the Delaware River at Fort Nassau, at the mouth of Big Timber Creek (south of today's Gloucester City, New Jersey). In 1642, members of the Connecticut Colony attempted to settle in the area, but their homes were burned and the nascent colony was repelled.

The Swedes had a competing claim for land at the mouth of the Schuylkill River, and they often vandalized Fort Beversreede. In 1648, they built a stockaded 30-by-20-foot blockhouse directly in front of it, called Fort Nya Korsholm. The Swedish building was said to be only twelve feet from the gate of the Dutch fort. It was meant to intimidate the Dutch residents and intercept trade.

In 1651, the Dutch abandoned Fort Beversreede and dismantled and relocated Fort Nassau to the Christina River, downstream from the Swedes' Fort Christina. The Dutch consolidated their forces at the rebuilt fort, renamed Fort Casimir. It was not until 1655 that control of the area was regained by the Dutch in a military expedition led by Director-General of New Netherland Petrus Stuyvesant, establishing a regional capital at New Amstel.

== Site ==
There is no remnant of either Fort Beversreede or Fort Nya Korsholm. Nearby Mud Island became the site of Fort Mifflin in 1771. Widening of the Schuylkill's channel, subsequent land reclamation, as well as other transportation and industrial infrastructure have dramatically changed the area. But the site of the forts (whether on the east or west bank of the Schuylkill) is probably south of the mouth of Mingo Creek and north of the George C. Platt Bridge.

== See also ==
- Fortifications of New Netherland
- Fort Wilhelmus
- New Netherland settlements
- Peach War
