= Sebastian Croll =

Commissary of Fort Orange

Sebastian Croll was a Dutchman said to have been made the first commissary of Fort Orange in 1617, which was built on the site of the present-day city of Albany, New York. He was also an elder in the "Church in the Fort," which was founded by the Rev. Jonas Michaelius in 1628.

The last name Croll is pronounced /krɔl/ in Dutch, similar to the English pronunciation, but according to an upper class widow living in Hudson, New York in 1909, one Mrs. Anna R. Bradbury, Croll is pronounced as "crull" in Dutch. Thus she claimed that he introduced the cruller to the New World, and that she thus believed him to be the eponym for the pastry. This belief has been repeated in other later US works.
