= House of Hope (fort) =

1633 Dutch trading house in Connecticut

Coordinates: 41.76°N 72.67°W

House of Hope (Dutch: Huys de Hoop), also known as Fort Good Hope (Dutch: Fort de Goede Hoop), was a redoubt and factory in the seventeenth-century Dutch colony of New Netherland. The trading post was located at modern-day Hartford, Connecticut at Park River, a tributary river of the Fresh River (Connecticut River). The location of this confluence of rivers is at contemporary Sheldon Street. The fort is recalled today with a nearby avenue called Huyshope, once the center of economic activity in the city.

== History ==
In 1633, the Dutch West India Company (WIC) (1621–1793) of the United Netherlands Dutch Republic built a fortified trading house on the south bank of the Little River (now Park River), a tributary river of the Fresh River (Connecticut River). The WIC had planned Fort Good Hope to be the northeastern fortification and a trading center of the WIC. The land was part of a larger tract purchased on 8 June 1633 by Jacob van Curler on behalf of the WIC from the Sequins, one of the clans of Connecticut Indians. Curler added a block house and palisade to the post while New Amsterdam sent a small garrison and a pair of cannons.

English settlers from other New England colonies moved into the Connecticut Valley in the 1630s. In 1633, William Holmes led a group of settlers from Plymouth Colony to the Connecticut Valley, where they established Windsor a few miles north of the Dutch trading post. In 1634, John Oldham and a handful of Massachusetts families built temporary houses in the area of Wethersfield, a few miles south of the Dutch outpost. In the next two years, 30 families from Watertown, Massachusetts joined Oldham's followers at Wethersfield. The English population of the area exploded in 1636 when clergyman Thomas Hooker led 100 settlers, including Richard Risley, with 130 head of cattle in a trek from Newtown (now Cambridge) in the Massachusetts Bay Colony to the banks of the Connecticut River, where they established Hartford directly across the Park River from the old Dutch fort. In 1637, the three Connecticut River towns—Windsor, Hartford, and Wethersfield—set up a collective government in order to fight the Pequot War.

In 1640 David Provoost was appointed Commander of Fort Good Hope

In 1650, representatives from New Netherland and New England agreed to the Hartford Convention to settle border disputes. The boundary between the two colonies was set 50 miles west of the Connecticut River, placing the fort on English territory. In 1653, during the First Anglo-Dutch War, the English seized the fort from its tiny Dutch garrison.

== See also ==
- Saukiog
- Fortifications of New Netherland
- New Netherland settlements
- Connecticut Colony
- Pequot
