= Johannes Dyckman =

Johannes Dyckman (bapt. 26 November 1619, Nieuwe Kerk (Amsterdam) – ca. 1672, New Netherland) was a Dutch commissary of Fort Orange.

Johannes Dyckman, the son of Joris Dijckman and Aeltie Paules/Poulus Root, came to New Netherland prior to 1652 with his second wife Maria Bosyns. Dyckman was commissary of Fort Orange, now Albany, New York, a position afterwards known as vice director. He served in this position from 1651 until June 1655 when he was incapacitated. Johannes and Maria had two children: Cornelis (b. 1647) and Johannes (b. 1662).
