= Burlington Island =

Island in the Delaware River

Coordinates: 40.0906°N 74.8464°W

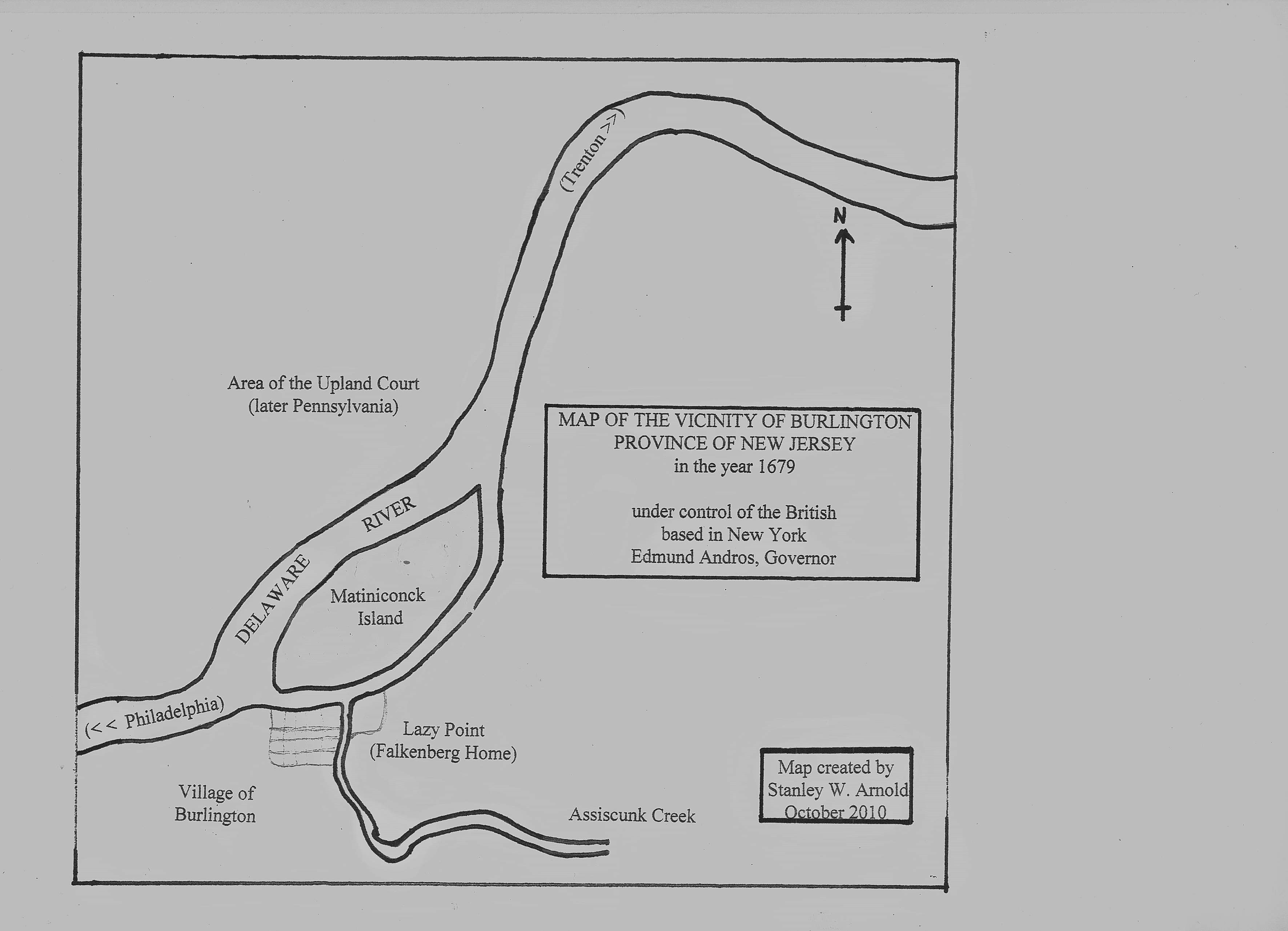

Burlington Island is a 300-acre (1.2 km^{2}) island located in the Delaware River between Pennsylvania and New Jersey in the United States. Burlington Island is officially part of the city of Burlington, in Burlington County, New Jersey, United States. It is an uninhabited scenic landmark in the Delaware River. Burlington Island Lake is a large artificial lagoon within the island.

== Fort Wilhelmus ==
The indigenous Lenape population called the island Matennecunk. In 1624, Cornelius Jacobsen Mey, the first Director of New Netherland planted an initial settlement of two families and eight men on what they called Hooghe Eylandt (High Island), making it the site of the first European settlement in what would become New Jersey. The factorij, or trading-post, called Fort Wilhelmus was completed under the direction of the 2nd director, Willem Verhulst, who lent his name to the island. Originally the Dutch West India Company intended to create a headquarters for the new province of New Netherland at what they called the Zuydt Rivier, or South River. In 1626, Peter Minuit decided to shift the base of operations to Manhattan Island, and move the trading post further south to what became Fort Nassau, one of many to be built along the river within the European colonies of New Netherland and New Sweden.

Though relations between the Lenni Lenape and the colonists were generally peaceful, Burlington Island witnessed one of the few murders of that era. In 1671, two Dutchmen were slaughtered by Tashiowycan and Wyannattamo. The Lenape then promised to kill the braves responsible; the murder is the first recorded in New Jersey's history.

== Island Beach Amusement Park ==
From 1900 to 1917, the lower part of the island was a popular picnic ground and bathing area. In 1917, Island Beach Amusement Park was constructed and became a regional attraction. Fires destroyed the amusement park in the 1920s and 1930s, and the southern part of the island was sold to a series of private owners whose ambitious development plans failed to materialize.

== 1925 US Navy Fighter Crash ==
On Saturday, 13 June 1925, United States Navy Lieutenant Frank E. White, developed engine trouble in his De Havilland DH.4B fighter while flying to Mitchel Field on Long Island, New York. White approached the Delaware River, and he prepared to land on the now largely abandoned island. At about 1,000 feet (300 m), the motor stopped, and he began a glide for the island with the wind. He overshot the island and immediately nose-dived into the river. He was taken unconscious to Harriman Hospital where despite initially awaking and responding to questions, he died during surgery two weeks later.

== Burlington Island Trust ==
Burlington Island came under the jurisdiction of The Board of Island Managers in 1727. The Board of Island Managers is a trust created to create funds to educate the youth of the city of Burlington. It is the longest continuously operating trust board in the United States.

== Industrial use ==
In 1953, ownership was transferred to the City of Burlington. The agreement allowed sand and gravel mining on the island which led to the creation of a 100 acres (0.40 km^{2}) lagoon.

== In popular culture ==
During the Summer of 1999, director Andrew Repasky McElhinney shot exteriors on Burlington Island for his second feature as a writer/director, the period art-horror film, A Chronicle of Corpses.
