= Fort Casimir =

17th-century Dutch fort in Delaware

Coordinates: 39°39′42″N 75°33′32″W

Fort Casimir was a Dutch fort in the seventeenth-century colony of New Netherland. It was located on a no-longer existing barrier island at the end of Chestnut Street in what is now New Castle, Delaware. It was briefly known as Fort Trinity when in possession of forces from New Sweden.

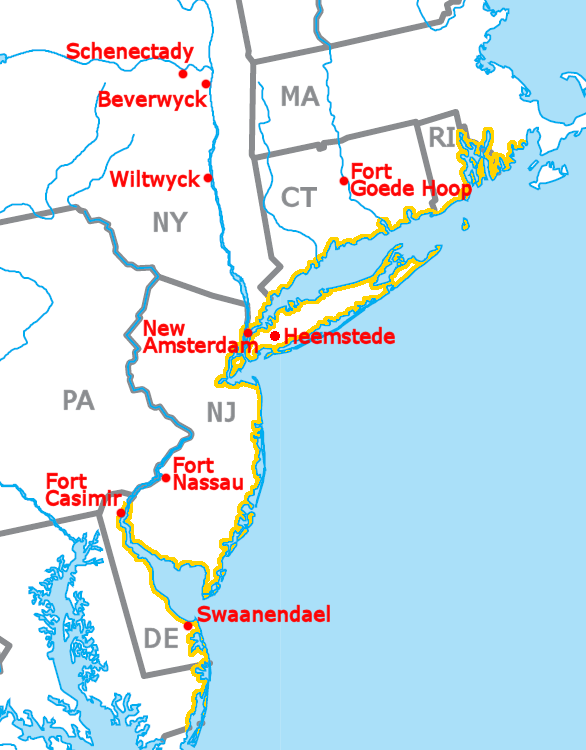
Modern map showing some New Netherland settlements including Fort Nassau and Fort Casimir. Yellow line marks the coast between the 38th and 42nd parallel, the greatest extent of the Dutch Empire's North American claim.

== Background ==
The Dutch called the Delaware River the Zuyd Rivier, or South River, and considered the lands along it banks and those of its bay to be the southern flank of its colony of New Netherland. In 1638, the Delaware Valley began to be settled by Swedes, Finns, Dutch, and Walloons and became the colony of New Sweden, though this was not officially recognized by the Dutch Empire.

== Sovereignty ==
The fort changed hands several times.

Shortly after his arrival to take up his position as up as Director-General of New Netherland in 1647, Peter Stuyvesant, attempted to re-assert control of the region and its lucrative trade. In his initial attempt at control, he effected the construction of Fort Beversreede near the terminus of the Great Minquas Path, at the mouth of the Schuylkill. The location of earlier-built Fort Nassau on the east bank (now New Jersey) of the river, had proved disadvantageous since the richest fur-trapping area of the native Susquehannock and Lenape populations was inland to the west. In 1651, Stuyvesant had the fort dismantled and relocated to the western bank downstream from Fort Christina, the first and one of the larger Swedish settlements. He named it Fort Casimir. Fort Beversreede was abandoned and the Dutch presence was consolidated.

On Trinity Sunday in 1654, Johan Risingh, Commissary and Councilor to New Sweden Governor Lt. Col. Johan Printz, officially assumed his duties and his attempts to expel the Dutch from the Delaware Valley. Fort Casimir surrendered to the Swedes and was renamed Fort Trinity (in Swedish Fort Trefaldighet). On June 21, 1654, the native peoples met with the Swedes to reaffirm their alliance.

Stuyvesant led a Dutch force which retook the fort on September 11, 1655, renaming it New Amstel (in Dutch Nieuw Amstel). Fort Christina, located 6.5 mi (10.5 km) to the north fell on September 15, 1655. Fort Nya Elfsborg, on the east bank, was abandoned and set afire by departing Swedish forces. New Sweden came under the control of the Dutch. John Paul Jacquet was immediately appointed vice director, making New Amstel a regional stronghold of the Dutch colony, subordinate to New Amsterdam. It has been suggested that the Peach War attack was a retaliation, as the indigenous population considered the treaty with the Swedes to include a defence alliance.

In 1664, the Dutch surrendered control of Fort Amsterdam, and thereafter all of New Netherland fell to the English. Proceeding south the English peacefully took Fort Altena. Some resistance was offered at Fort Casimir, but the fort quickly succumbed. In 1673–1674 it came under Dutch control again, but reverted to the English after the signing of the Treaty of Westminster.

The fort was abandoned around 1675 and the site was used for several different commercial purposes. Low laying areas around the old fort site were filled with ash. It is believed that presently a parking lot and several houses are located above the remains of the fort. A preliminary archeological survey of the area was conducted in 1986.

== Name ==
Casimir was the name of several Polish kings known for success in battle, as well as the contemporary John Casimir when the fort was named by Petrus Stuyvesant. Historian Joseph Wytrwal found that one of Stuyvesant's confidantes and trusted burghers was Daniel Liczko, a Pole, and Stuyvesant encouraged Polish tradesmen and soldiers to settle in New Netherland.

It has also been suggested that the fort was named for Ernst Casimir of Nassau-Dietz who was also Stadtholder of Friesland, Groningen and Drenthe, but there is no documentary evidence to support this idea.

== See also ==
- Fortifications of New Netherland
- New Netherland settlements
- Zwaanendael Colony

== Other sources ==
- Johnson, Amandus: The Swedes in America 1638-1900: Vol. I, The Swedes on the Delaware 1638-1664. (1914)
- Johnson, Amandus: Johan Classon Rising: The last governor of New Sweden (1915)
- Johnson, Amandus: The Swedish Settlements on the Delaware 1638-1664, Volume II (1927)
- Weslager, C. A.: The Swedes and Dutch at New Castle (1987)
