= Fort Wilhelmus =

Factorij in the 17th-century New Netherland, in present-day New Jersey, United States

Coordinates: 40°5′30″N 74°50′45″W

Fort Wilhelmus was a factorij in the 17th-century colonial province of New Netherland, located on what had been named Hooghe Eyland (High Island) (also called Verhulsten Island) on the Zuyd Rivier, now Burlington Island in the Delaware River in New Jersey. More a trading post than a military installation, it was built in 1625 by colonists from the Netherlands in the employ of the Dutch West India Company, with the intention of establishing a physical claim to the new territory and to engage in the fur trade with the indigenous population of Lenape and Minqua. The Walloon families had originally arrived at Noten Island (Governors Island) across from New Amsterdam in the Upper New York Bay, They had been sent south in order to begin the population of the province of New Netherland. They were later recalled to Fort Amsterdam since the Dutch West India Company had decided to concentrate their settlement efforts along the North River, or Hudson River.

The fort was likely so called from "Het Wilhelmus" (English translation: "The William"), a song which tells of Willem van Oranje, his life and why he is fighting for the Dutch people. It became, in 1932, the national anthem of the Netherlands and is the oldest national anthem in the world. Although it was not recognized as the official national anthem until 1932, it remained popular with the Dutch people since its creation.

== See also ==
- Forts of New Netherland
- Pidgen Delaware
- Fort Nassau (South River)
- Willem Verhulst
- New Netherland settlements
