= Fort Nassau (North River) =

First Dutch settlement in North America (1614–18)

- Part of New Netherland
- Albany, New York
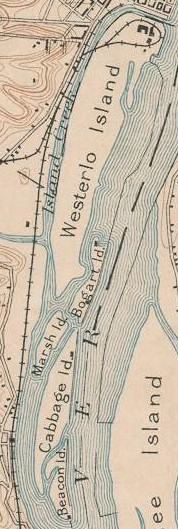
- 1893 map of Westerlo Island now Castle Island

Site information
- Type: Fort

Location
- Location within New York
- Coordinates: 42°38′09″N 73°45′17″W

Site history
- Built: 1614
- Built by: Hendrick Christiaensen
- Materials: Wooden structure surrounded by earthenworks
- Demolished: 1618
- Events: First Dutch fort in North America

Garrison information
- Past commanders: Jacob Eelkens
- Garrison: 10 or 12 men
- Occupants: Dutch traders and soldiers

Fort Nassau was the first Dutch settlement in North America, located beside the "North River" (the modern Hudson) within present-day Albany, New York, in the United States. The factorij was a small fortification which served as a trading post and warehouse.

== History ==
Henry Hudson explored what would be known as the Hudson River for the Dutch in 1609, including Castle Island which was at the center of Native American fur trading routes from the interior. Hendrick Christiaensen chose Castle Island to build Fort Nassau, in 1614 or 1615 as a dual warehouse and military defense structure and named the fort in honor of the stadtholder of the United Netherlands, who was of the House of Orange-Nassau. Nineteenth and early-twentieth century historians claimed that around 1540, French fur traders built a stone "castle" or fortified trading post on Castle Island in the location where Fort Nassau was later built. However, modern scholars have found no evidence to support this claim. Fort Nassau was the first Dutch settlement in North America. Jacob Eelkens became commander on Christiaensen's death in 1616.

In 1617 a freshet damaged the fort to such an extent that it was abandoned and rebuilt on more secure ground at the mouth of the Normans Kill (called the Tawasentha by the natives) with the Hudson River. This new fortification was built by Eelkens on a prominence called Tawass-gunshee by the natives. Once the new fort was completed, the Dutch completed their first treaty with natives of North America. In 1618 a freshet destroyed the new fort, and it was abandoned for good.

In 1624, the Dutch built Fort Orange about a mile to the north, at current Albany. Castle Island is now part of the Port of Albany–Rensselaer.

== Geography ==
Fort Nassau was built on what is now called Westerlo Island and was formerly called Castle Island. The island was part of the town of Bethlehem until 1926 when it was annexed to the city of Albany. It has been part of the Port of Albany-Rensselaer since 1932.

== Structure ==
Fort Nassau was a 36-foot (11 m) long by 26-foot (7.9 m) wide building enclosed by a 58-foot (18 m) square stockade surrounded by an 18-foot (5.5 m) wide moat. The fort was defended by two large cannon and eleven swivel guns. The fort was garrisoned by 10-12 men.

== See also ==
- Two Row Wampum Treaty
- Fort Nassau (South River)
- Fortifications of New Netherland
- History of Albany, New York
- New Netherland settlements

Preceded by French fort 1540	Forts of Albany, New York; Fort Nassau; 1614-1618	Succeeded by Fort Orange; 1623-1676
