= Treaty of Hartford (1650) =

Treaty between New Netherland and Connecticut

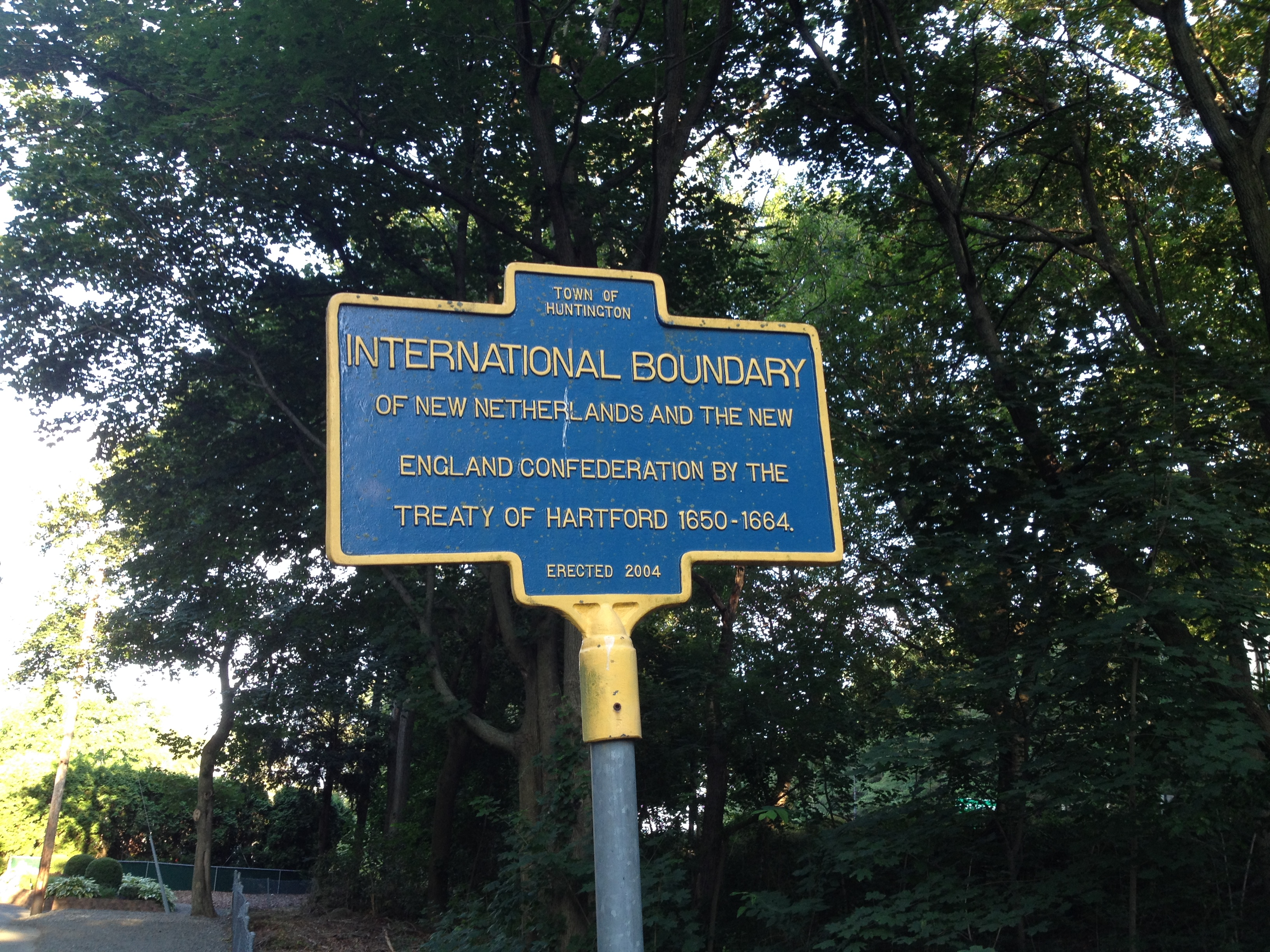
Town of Huntington Historical Marker of Treaty of Hartford Boundary (1650–1664).

The Treaty of Hartford is a treaty concluded between New Netherland and Connecticut Colony on September 19, 1650, in Hartford, Connecticut.

== Background ==
In 1650, Dutch Director-General of New Netherland Petrus Stuyvesant went to Hartford to negotiate a border with the governor of English Connecticut colony Edward Hopkins. The Dutch colony of New Netherland was feeling increased pressure from the rising number of English colonists at its borders.

== The treaty ==
Stuyvesant traded Connecticut land claims (the New Netherland claim encompassed the full length of the Connecticut River and as far east as Narragansett Bay) in order to get a clear boundary on Long Island. They agreed on a Connecticut line 50 Dutch miles west of the mouth of the Connecticut River. On Long Island, a line would be drawn south from the westernmost point of Oyster Bay, through modern Nassau County. The treaty was signed on September 19.

In practice, the treaty simply reflected changed facts on the ground. Settlement of the Dutch colony had clustered around the Hudson River with only isolated trading posts on the Connecticut (including Fort Hoop, which would become Hartford, Connecticut). The exploding population of New England, and the splintering impulses of its religious-based colonies, had led to significant English settlement in the Connecticut River Valley, along the coast of Long Island Sound and on eastern Long Island.

== Aftermath ==
Back in Europe, the Dutch West India Company approved the treaty, but the English government, which rejected all Dutch claims in North America as illegitimate, did not. In America, however, the agreement held straight through the English conquest of New Netherland in 1664. Indeed, the borders today between Connecticut and New York, and between Nassau and Suffolk Counties on Long Island, are, with some minor adjustments, those negotiated in 1650.
