= Fort Nassau (South River) =

Dutch fortress in New Jersey

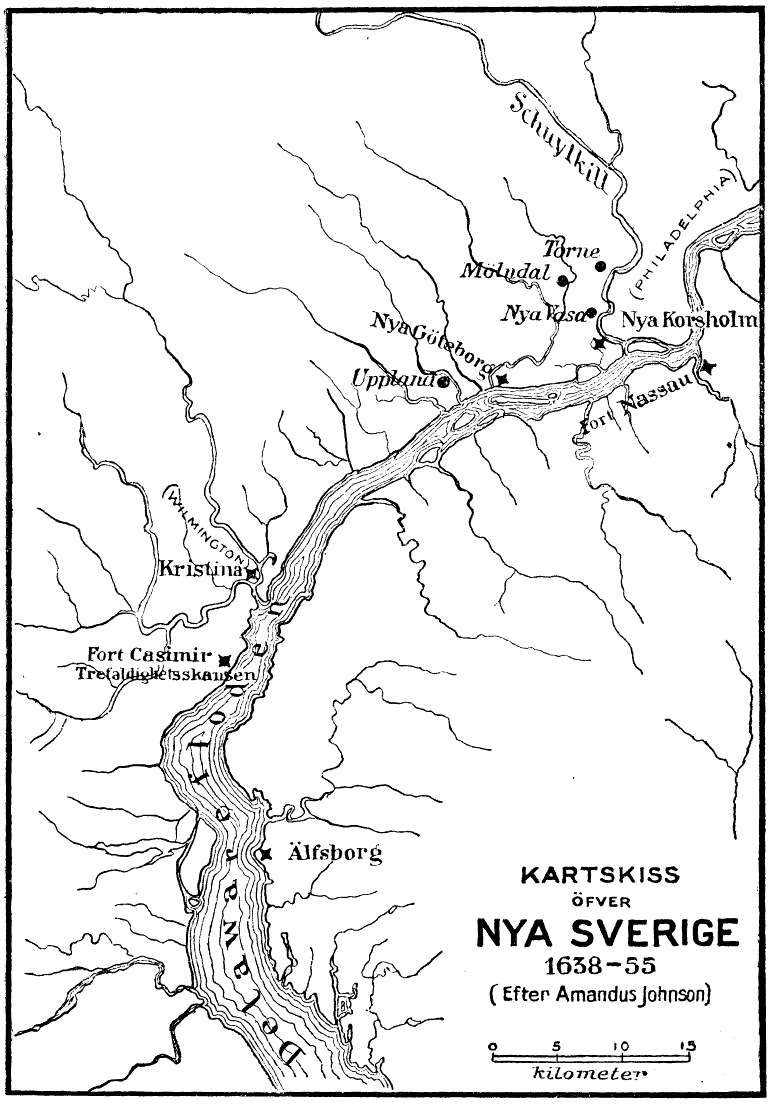
The South River c. 1650.

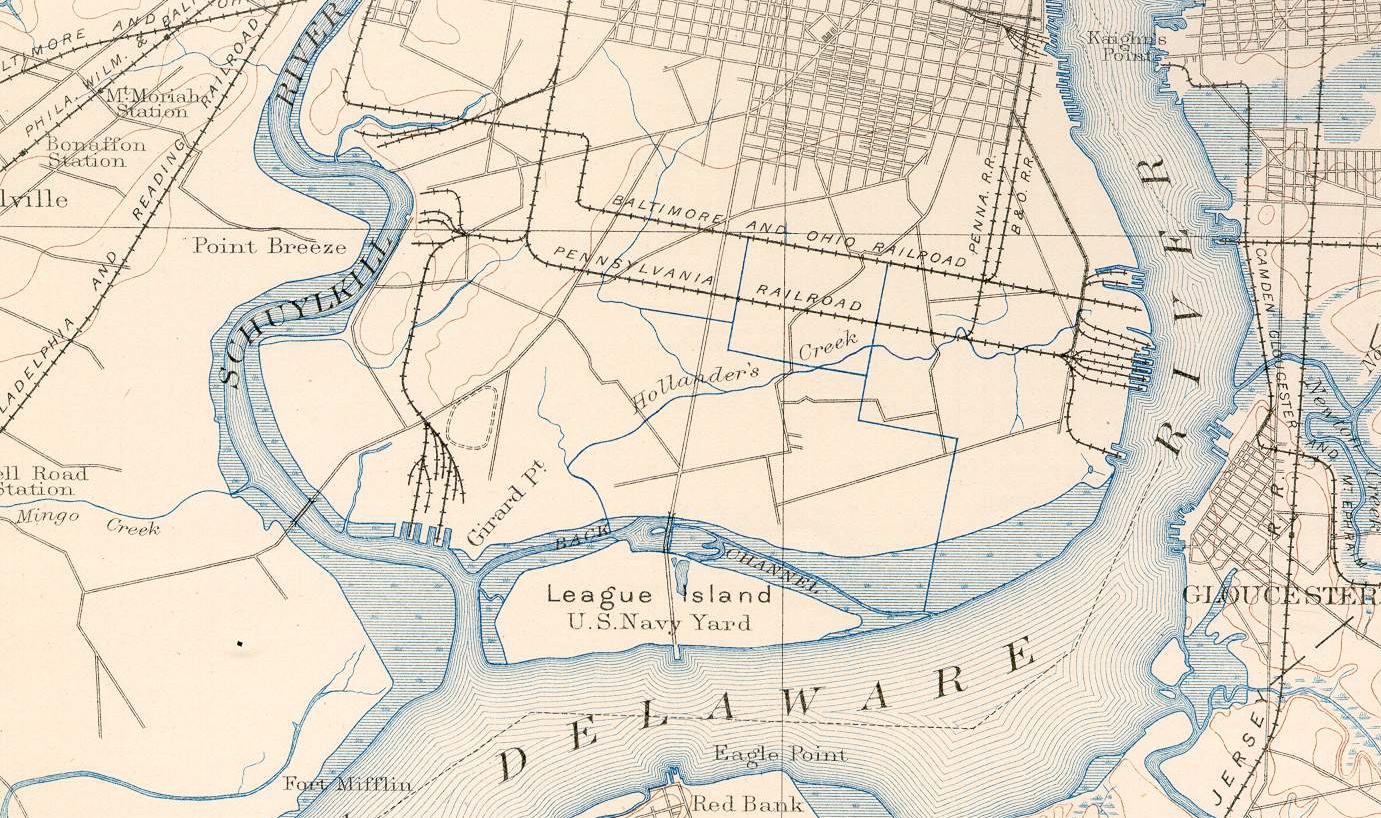
1891 USGS 1891 map showing the confluence of the Schuylkill and Delaware rivers, site of Dutch and Swedish forts

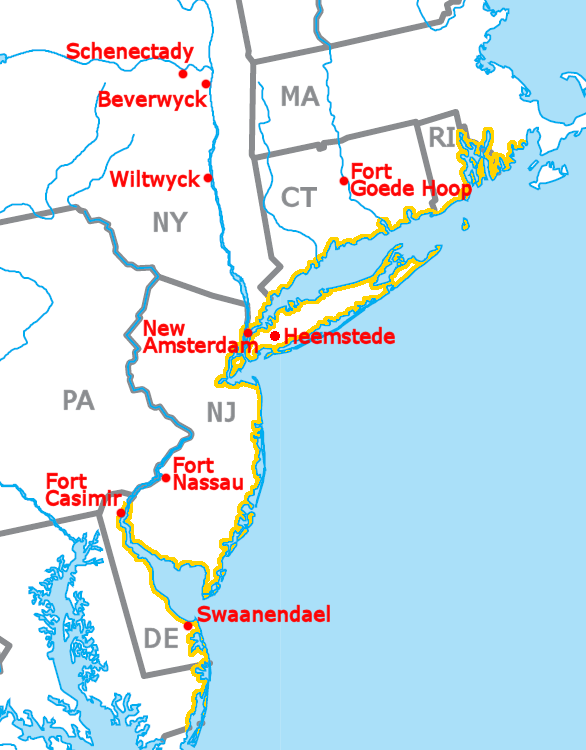
Modern map showing some New Netherland settlements

Fort Nassau was a factorij, or Dutch trading post, in New Netherland between 1624–1651 located at the mouth of Big Timber Creek at its confluence with the Delaware River. It was the first known permanent European-built structure in what would become the state of New Jersey. The creek name is a derived from the Dutch language Timmer Kill as recorded by David Pietersen de Vries in his memoirs of his journey of 1630–1633. The Delaware Valley and its bay was called the "South River" (Dutch: Zuyd Rivier); the "North River" of the colony was the Hudson River. The factorij was established for the fur trade, mostly in beaver pelts, with the indigenous populations of Susquehannock, who spoke an Iroquoian language, and the Lenape, whose language was of the Algonquian family. They also wanted to retain a physical claim to the territory.

While the fort is generally described as being at today's Gloucester City, New Jersey (39°53′41″N 75°07′45″W); analysis places it on the peninsula in the cove, now Brooklawn (39°52′50″N 75°07′36″W). or possibly on the south side of the creek's cove, at today's Westville (39°52′48″N 75°08′19″W).

Initially the fort was occupied intermittently, and on occasion used by the local population in seasonal migrations. In 1635, colonists from Virginia Colony occupied the fort. The governor of New Netherland at the time, Wouter van Twiller, sent a force and was successful in retaking the fort. This was the first of conflicts between the English and Dutch in the New World. While thereafter the fort was continuously manned, the location was ill-suited to trade, as the richest fur-trapping areas were on the west side of the Delaware River.

From 1638–1655 the Delaware Valley was part of New Sweden. It was established by Peter Minuit, former Director of New Netherland who had purchased the island of Manhattan. In 1651, Petrus Stuyvesant, Director-General of New Netherland, had his local representative Andries Hudde partially dismantle the fort, relocating its armaments and other equipment to a position on the other side of the river. He wanted to menace the Swedish and re-assert jurisdiction of the region; he renamed the structure as Fort Casimir.

On Trinity Sunday in 1654, Johan Risingh, Commissary and Councilor to New Sweden Governor Lt. Col. Johan Printz, officially assumed his duties. He tried to expel the Dutch from the Delaware Valley and sent forces against Fort Casimir; the garrison surrendered. He renamed it as Fort Trinity (in Swedish Fort Trefaldighet). The Swedes now completely controlled their colony. On June 21, 1654, local bands of the Lenape met with the Swedes to reaffirm their ownership.

Peter Stuyvesant led a Dutch force which retook the fort on September 11, 1655. He renamed it as New Amstel (in Dutch Nieuw Amstel). Subsequently, Fort Christina also fell to the Dutch on September 15 and all New Sweden came under their control. The Dutch appointed John Paul Jacquet as governor, and made New Amstel the capital of the Dutch-controlled colony.

== See also ==
- Kill (body of water)
- Fort Beversreede
- Fort Wilhelmus
- Fortifications of New Netherland
- New Netherland settlements
- Zwaanendael
- Fort Nassau (North River)
- Pidgen Delaware
