= Fort Orange (New Netherland) =

Historic site in Albany, New York

- Fort Orange Archeological Site
- U.S. National Register of Historic Places
- U.S. National Historic Landmark
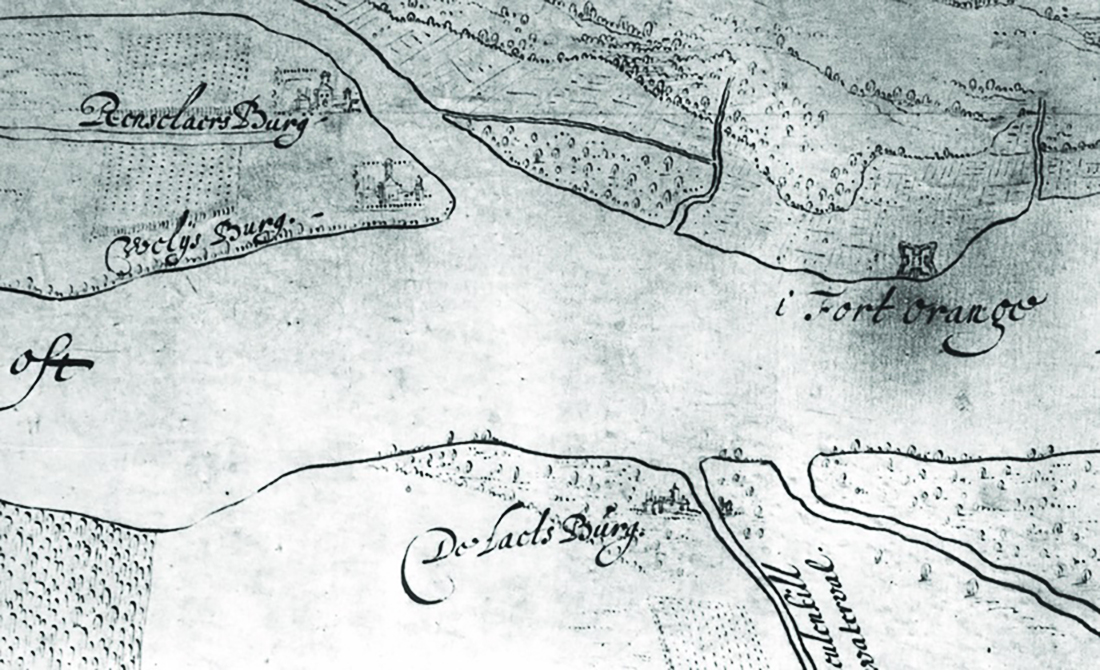
- Fort Orange in c. 1630 (Rensselaerswyck map detail)

- Location within New York Location within the United States
- Location: Albany, New York
- Coordinates: 42°38′41.46″N 73°45′1.05″W
- Built: 1624
- NRHP reference No.: 93001620

Significant dates
- Added to NRHP: November 4, 1993
- Designated NHL: November 4, 1993

Fort Orange (Dutch: Fort Oranje) was the first permanent Dutch settlement in New Netherland; the present-day city and state capital Albany, New York developed near this site. It was built in 1624 as a replacement for Fort Nassau, which had been built on nearby Castle Island and served as a trading post until 1617 or 1618, when it was abandoned due to frequent flooding. Both forts were named in honor of the Dutch House of Orange-Nassau. Due to a dispute between the Director-General of New Netherland and the patroonship of Rensselaerswyck regarding jurisdiction over the fort and the surrounding community, the fort and community became an independent municipality, paving the way for the future city of Albany. After the English reconquered the region they soon abandoned Fort Orange (renamed Fort Albany) in favor of a new fort: Fort Frederick, constructed in 1676.

== History ==
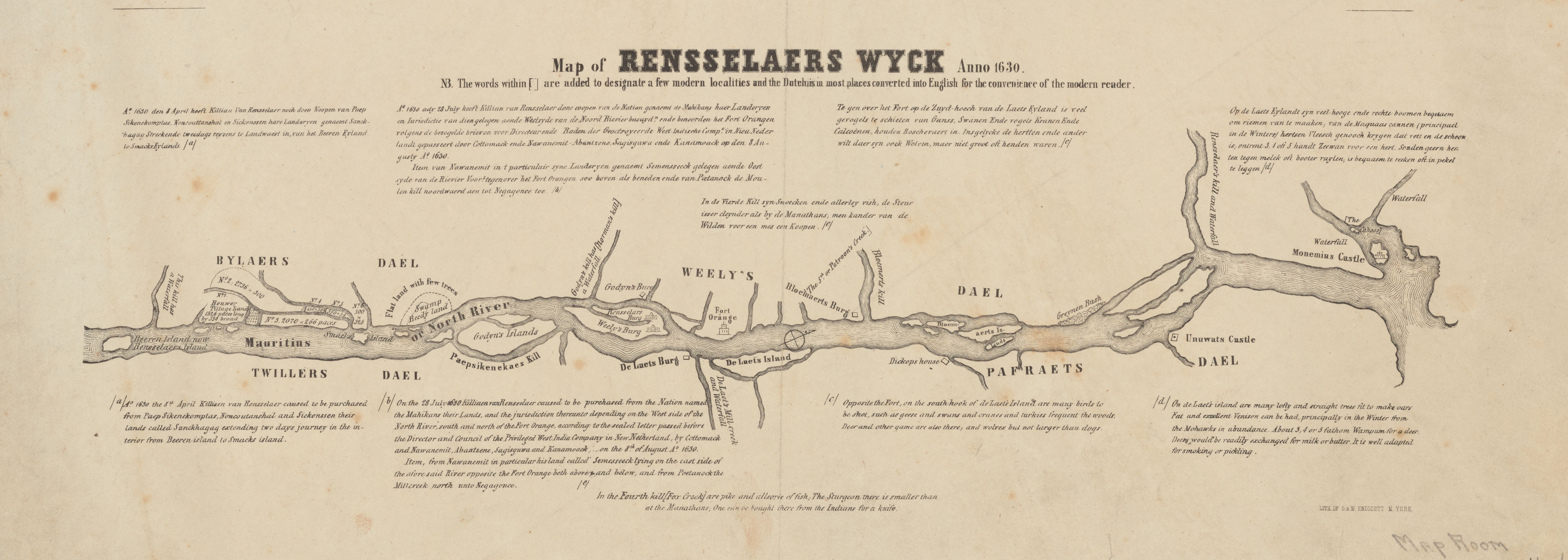
Map of Rensselaers Wyck anno 1630 with Fort Orange

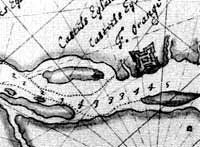
Map of Castle Island and Fort Orange in 1629

In 1624, a ship with 30 Protestant Walloons (people from what is today southern Belgium) landed in New Netherland; 18 of the men were sent to the location near present-day Albany. Under direction of the Dutch, they built Fort Orange roughly 2 miles (3.2 km) north of Fort Nassau, which was prone to flooding, and about five miles south of the confluence of the Mohawk River and the North River.

The Walloons were later recalled south to settle New Amsterdam. A 1628 publication on the population of New Netherland stated that "there are no families at Fort Orange ... they keep five or six and twenty (25 or 26) persons, traders, there". In 1626, they traded over 8,000 beaver and other furs. The commander of Fort Orange and a company of men set out from the fort that year to assist the Mohican people in their war against the Mohawk, the powerful Iroquois tribe based in the Mohawk Valley to the west of the fort. The Dutch party was ambushed and three men were killed approximately a mile from the fort, roughly where Lincoln Park and Delaware Avenue are sited today. An estimated 30,000 fur pelts per year were moving through Fort Orange by 1633.

Whereas later settlement would be through the purchase of land from the Native Americans, the Dutch built Fort Orange without any consent. They continued to hold it only through the goodwill of the Mahican, and the occasional presents that they gave to the local Mahicans.

When the Dutch established the Charter of Privileges and Exemptions in 1629 setting up the patroon system, Kiliaen van Rensselaer established his patroonship of Rensselaerswyck, surrounding Fort Orange on 24 miles (39 km) of shoreline along the Hudson River and 24 miles (39 km) inland on each side of the fort. This land patent was interpreted by van Rensselaer as including Fort Orange and the settlement that had begun outside its walls. He began purchasing and acquiring title to the lands from the Mahican.

In 1630, Gillis Hoosett purchased in van Rensselaer's name the lands to the south and north of the fort from the natives. Later in 1630 the first permanent Dutch settlers and farmers came to Fort Orange and settled on the outskirts of the fort; their village was first called the Fuyck and later Beverwyck. In 1634 the commander of Fort Orange ordered Harmen Meyndertsz van den Bogaert west into the Mohawk Valley and Indian country, for the purpose of understanding why the fur trade had declined. The trip lasted six weeks and took Bogaert and his men through a number of Mohawk villages and into Oneida villages, at least 100 miles from the fort. This journey was recorded in van den Bogaert's daily journal which is titled, A Journey into Mohawk and Oneida Country. In the 1640s a French Jesuit priest and missionary, Isaac Jogues, described Fort Orange as "a wretched little fort ... built of stakes, with four or five pieces of cannon of Breteuil".

In 1648, dispute arose between agents of the Dutch West India Company and agents of the patroon over control of Fort Orange and the surrounding settlement. The Director-General of New Netherland, representing the West India Company, was Pieter Stuyvesant, who saw the patroon's position, power, and land as a direct threat to the West India Company's ability to profit from the beaver pelt trade in Fort Orange. Several confrontations arose over the status of the fort and the rights of settlers around it. Stuyvesant at first ordered all buildings within cannon shot of the fort to be destroyed, then lowered that circumference to that of musket shot. In response, the patroon's agent, Commander van Schlechtenhorst, decided to expand settlement to "within pistol shot of Fort Orange".

After the yearly freshets had damaged much of the fort, the West India Company decided to reconstruct the fort using stone. In response, van Schlechtenhorst declared it illegal for anyone to quarry stone within Rensselaerswyck for the fort or for anyone to sell the material to the fort's commander, Carl van Brugge. All material for the fort had to be shipped in from outside the colony. Van Schlechtenhorst claimed that Fort Orange had been illegally built on the patroon's lands, while Stuyvesant noted that Fort Orange had been built 15 years prior to the establishment of Rensselaerswyck.

In 1651, Stuyvesant declared the jurisdiction of the fort to extend 600 paces around the fort, thereby severing it from Rensselaerswyck; he appointed Johannes Dyckman as commissary of Fort Orange. In 1652, Stuyvesant, to settle this dispute once and for all, set up a "Court of Justice for the Village of Beverwyck and its dependencies", the first municipal government for the future city of Albany.

At the time when Beverwyck consisted of roughly 100 structures huddled next to the fort, Stuyvesant set up Beverwyck at a safer distance from the cannons of the fort and laid out future Albany's oldest streets – State Street and Broadway.

By the end of the 1650s, the fort was in disrepair again, and both Fort Orange and Beverwyck were enclosed by a wooden stockade in 1660.

In 1663, smallpox raged in Fort Orange, killing one person a day, which was a large percentage given the small population in the fort. On September 8, 1664, the English, after sending numerous war ships to New Amsterdam, demanded the surrender of New Netherland and came to terms with the Dutch. On that date New Netherland became the Province of New York with Colonel Richard Nicolls appointed as the first English colonial governor; New Amsterdam was renamed New York. Johannes De Decker sailed on that day from New Amsterdam to Fort Orange to rally the troops and settlers to resist English rule. On September 10, Governor Nicholls sent troops to demand the peaceful surrender of the "Fort Aurania", aurania being the Latin name for "orange" that the English used when referring to Fort Orange.

It was not until September 24, 1664, that vice-director of New Netherland Johannes de Montagne surrendered the fort to the English, and Colonel George Cartwright took command. On the 25th, Captain John Manning was given control of the fort, which was renamed Fort Albany; Beverwyck was named Albany. (Note: Beverwyck was named "Albany" in honor of the Duke of York and of Albany (later James II of England). James Stuart (1633–1701), brother and successor of Charles II, was both the Duke of York and of Albany before being crowned James II of England and James VII of Scotland in 1685. His title of Duke of York is the source of the name of the province of New York. Duke of Albany was a Scottish title given since 1398, generally to a younger son of the King of Scots. The name is ultimately derived from Alba, the Gaelic name for Scotland.)

In 1673 the Dutch retook New York City, which they named New Orange, on July 29, then retook Albany on August 3. In September, Albany was renamed Willemstadt and Fort Albany became Fort Nassau. The Treaty of Westminster, signed on February 19, 1674, renamed New Orange and Willemstadt back to their English names; Fort Nassau became Fort Albany and Willemstadt became Albany.

In 1666, Jeremias van Rensselaer, then-patroon of Rensselaerswyck, had petitioned the new government of Governor Nicholls to recognize Fort Albany (Fort Orange) as part of Rensselaerswyck. Governor Nicholls informed him that he would be wise to drop the matter until he heard from the Duke of York. In 1678, Governor Andros issued to the patroon's heirs a grant reaffirming the patroon's rights over Rensselaerswyck, but leaving out Fort Albany and the immediate area around the fort.

The English abandoned Fort Orange and built a new fort on top of State Street Hill named Fort Frederick; it served both to defend the settlement from the Mohawk and other Iroquois to the west and to be on high ground to remind the Dutch inhabitants of English rule. The land around the old fort was sold to the Dutch Reformed Church for use as pastureland, but the fort structure continued to deteriorate. It was indicated on maps during the 18th century, labeled as "ruins of an Old Fort." Richard Smith, a traveler, observed by 1769 that there was "nothing to be seen of Fort Orange... but the Ditch which surrounded it". After the American Revolutionary War, the deteriorated site of the old fort was memorialized as a historic site and was the site of many historical observances.

=== Subsequent occupation ===
Simeon De Witt built a large house or mansion and a number of outbuildings on the site of the old Dutch fort during the 1790s; the address for the site of the old fort became 549 South Market Street (later Broadway). On his property traces of the old fort could still be seen as late as 1812. He lived at this location while he was the surveyor-general of New York. Following his death, his mansion and outbuildings were adapted for use as the Fort Orange Hotel. It burned down in 1848 but was rebuilt in a second structure under the same name.

In 1886, as part of the bicentennial of Albany's incorporating document, the Dongan Charter, the city erected a bronze metal engraved tablet at the site of the northeastern bastion of Fort Orange. In the 1930s the tablet was moved during construction of the first of two Dunn Memorial Bridges (named for Private Parker F. Dunn (1890–1918, a local veteran / soldier of the United States Army, killed on the Western Front in northern France, during the First World War (1914/1917–1918), and awarded the congressional Medal of Honor, the current second / replacement span built in 1969. It carries U.S. Route 9 and U.S. Route 20 highways across the upper Hudson River, between Albany on the west to Rensselaer, New York in the east.

For almost 100 years, the original installation site of the plaque did not mark the true accurate site of the colonial era Dutch military post of Fort Orange. The Albany Institute of History and Art has a cannonball labeled as "Dug up at Fort Orange site July 22nd 1886", the date / year that the bicentennial marker was placed. No known accurate historical research or archeological excavations digging were done back then in the 1880s, other than simply placing the bronze historical marker. The tablet was moved again in 1971 after the 1970–71 archeologist historical excavations discovered remnants of the Dutch fort which were prompted during the construction project for nearby larger / modern Interstate 787 and the highway interchange with the South Mall Expressway. The marker was returned to the actual verified site of historic Fort Orange, but not to the former location of the northeastern bastion.

As the Fort Orange Archeological Site, the area of the fort was declared a National Historic Landmark (and added to the lists of the National Register of Historic Places) on November 4, 1993, (maintained by the National Park Service of the United States Department of the Interior).

== Commanders of the Dutch and English / British forts ==
- Adriaen Jorrissen Thienpont
- Daniel van Krieckebeck ("Crieckenbeeck ... killed by Mohawks in 1626")
- Bastiaen Jansz Krol ("appointed commissary of Fort Orange several months ... after ... was killed by Mohawks in 1626"; "Krol returned to the Netherlands in 1629")
- Hans Jorissen Houten
- Carl van Brugge
- Johannes Dyckman
- Johannes de Decker
- Johannes de la Montagne

=== As Fort Albany under the English ===
- Captain John Manning
- Captain John Baker

=== As Fort Nassau under the Dutch ===
- Lieutenant Andries Draeyer

== Archeological historical excavations (1970–1971) ==
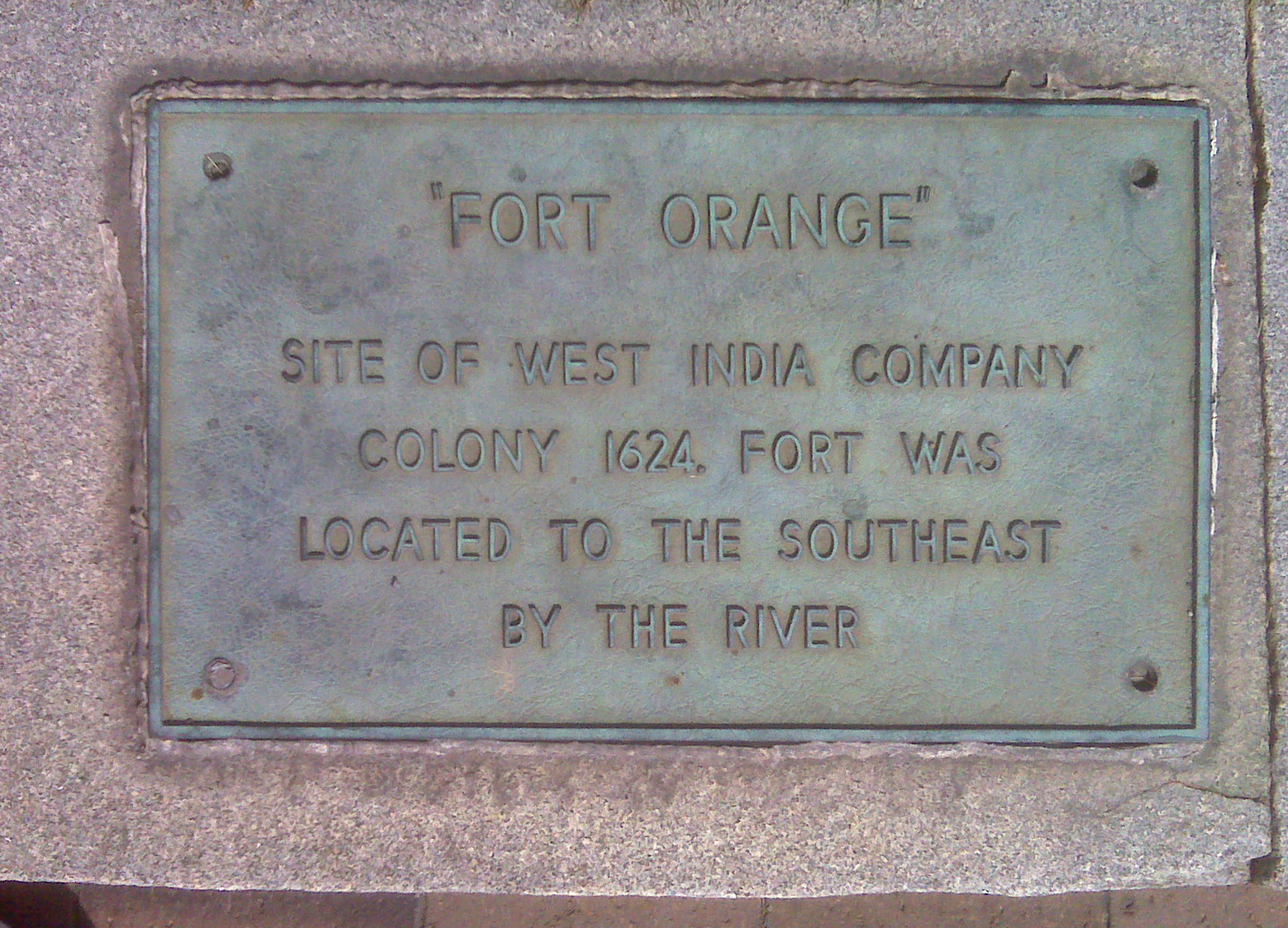
Bronze metal historical marker on Broadway at Foot of State Street, downtown Albany, New York

Prior to the 1970 excavations, no 17th century Dutch colonial era artifacts had been discovered in Albany. The excavations were undertaken by the New York State Historic Trust with the cooperation of the New York State Department of Transportation from October 20, 1970, until March 1971. The first test hole was made in what had been the cellar of the De Witt house, which had obliterated all remnants of the old fort. Digging at a site under Broadway in front of the house turned up many pieces from the Dutch colonial past. Among those were a Jew's harp, tobacco pipes, beads, Rhenish stoneware, and Delftware. The excavations also revealed the former south moat and counterscarp, a pebbled path from the east entrance of the fort, a brewery owned by Jean Labatie built in 1647, and parts of several houses owned by Hendrick Andriessen van Doesburgh, Abraham Staats, and Hans Vos.

From the excavations, scholars noted that venison (deer meat) made up the majority of the meat eaten by the settlers and soldiers of the fort, followed by pork. The greatest number of fish bones and scales were found in a pit 20 feet (6.1 m) south of the pebbled entrance path dating from before 1648. Sturgeon were found infrequently in later 17th-century deposits. Eating and drinking utensils consisted of lead-glazed red-bodied and white/buff bodied earthenware, tin earthenware, Rhenish German stoneware, Chinese Empire porcelain, glass roemers, Spechter glasses, and façon de Venise glassware. The tin-glazed earthenware, at least prior to 1650, were of the majolica variety and not delftware. Porcelain was rare, found only as a few shards. The remains of many clay pipes were found, often with the "EB" maker's mark of Eduard Bird (c. 1610–65) of Amsterdam. The site was in continual use and artifacts recovered include 1830s creamware or pearlware and 1860s copper bottom coffee pot remnants. The artifacts from the excavation are housed and occasionally exhibited at the New York State Museum in Albany.

== See also ==
- History of Albany, New York
- List of National Historic Landmarks in New York
- National Register of Historic Places listings in Albany, New York
- Sebastian Croll

== Notes ==
Preceded by Fort Nassau; 1614–1618	Forts of Albany, New York; Fort Orange; 1623–1676	Succeeded by Fort Frederick; 1676–1789
