= Juan Rodriguez (trader) =

First non-native resident of Manhattan Island

Juan Rodriguez (Dutch: Jan Rodrigues, Portuguese: João Rodrigues) was the first documented non-indigenous inhabitant to live on Manhattan Island. As such, he is considered the first non-native resident of what would eventually become New York City.

As he was born in the Captaincy General of Santo Domingo, the first colony of Spain, to a Portuguese sailor and a West African woman, he is considered by many to be the first person of European and/or West African origin to settle on the island of Manhattan.

== Biography ==
Rodriguez was born in the Captaincy General of Santo Domingo (now the Dominican Republic) to an African woman and a Portuguese sailor, in an era in which a tenth of the Dominican population was born in Portugal, in dynastic union with the Spanish Crown (see Iberian Union).

Raised in a cultural environment in the Spanish settlement of Santo Domingo, Rodrigues was known for his linguistic talents and was hired by the Dutch captain Thijs Volckenz Mossel of the Jonge Tobias to serve as the translator on a trading voyage to the Lenape island of Mannahattan.

After arriving in 1613, Rodriguez learned the Algonquian language of the Lenape people and later married into the local community. When Mossel's ship returned to the Netherlands, Rodriguez stayed behind with his Lenape family. He set up his own trading post and accepted his wages in goods with Mossell supplying him with "eighty hatchets, some knives, a musket, and a saber" . When Hendrick Christiaensen arrived later that year as captain of the Dutch ship, The Fortuyn, Rodriguez facilitated trade relations between the captain and the Lenape. Upon his return, Mossell was upset that Rodriquez had helped someone he saw as a competitor.

He spent the winter without the support of anchored ship, at a Dutch fur trading post on Lower Manhattan that had been set up by Hendrick Christiaensen in 1613. This small settlement and others along the North River, such as Fort Nassau (Albany), were part of a private enterprise.

In 1621 the Dutch Republic firmly established its claim to New Netherland and offered a patent for a trade monopoly in the region. In 1624, a group of settlers established a small colony on Governors Island. Together with a contingent of coming from the Netherlands that same year, the traders established in the settlement of New Amsterdam.

== Report of Adriaen Block ==
In the early spring of 1613, fur trader Adriaen Block complained bitterly that a competitor, Thijs Volckenz Mossel, commander of the Jonge Tobias, had tried to "spoil the trade" by offering three times more than Block for beaver skins. In his report against Mossel, which he submitted to the Amsterdam Notary upon his return to Holland, Block alleged that against Mossel has allowed:

"crewman Rodrigues had become a permanent fixture in the Manhattan frontier, trading and living alone among the natives. When the said Mossel sailed away from the river with his ship, Rodrigues, born in Sto. Domingo, who had arrived there with the ship of said Mossel, stayed ashore at the same place. They had given Rodrigues eighty hatchets, some knives, a musket and a sword."

According to Block, Mossel denied that Rodrigues was working on his behalf. Rodrigues had taken it upon himself to gain friendship with the natives, set up a trading post, and live comfortably on Manhattan Island.

Mossel declared that

this Spaniard [Rodrigues] had run away from the ship and gone ashore against his intent and will and that he had given him the said goods in payment of his wages and therefore had nothing more to do with him.

Block closed his report by writing that he knew of no other crewman who stayed behind but Rodrigues. The natives, who preferred the goods and ironware sold by Rodrigues over their own, seemed to have accepted him as the island's first merchant.

By the autumn of 1613, three Dutch ships had arrived: De Tijger, captained by Block; the Fortuyn, captained by Hendrick Christiaensen; and the Nachtegaal, captained by Mossel. This time it was Christiaensen who wrote about Rodrigues. His log states that Rodrigues came aboard the Nachtegaal, presented himself as a freeman, and offered to work for Christiaensen trading furs. The historical record leaves us with few details about the remainder of the life of Juan Rodrigues.

== Legacy ==
A mural created by Creative Arts Workshops for Kids in 2009, in sponsorship with the Harlem River Park Task Force, Harlem Community Development Corporation and New York State Department of Transportation, depicts an image of Jan Rodrigues as he might have appeared in 1613.

=== Juan Rodríguez Way ===
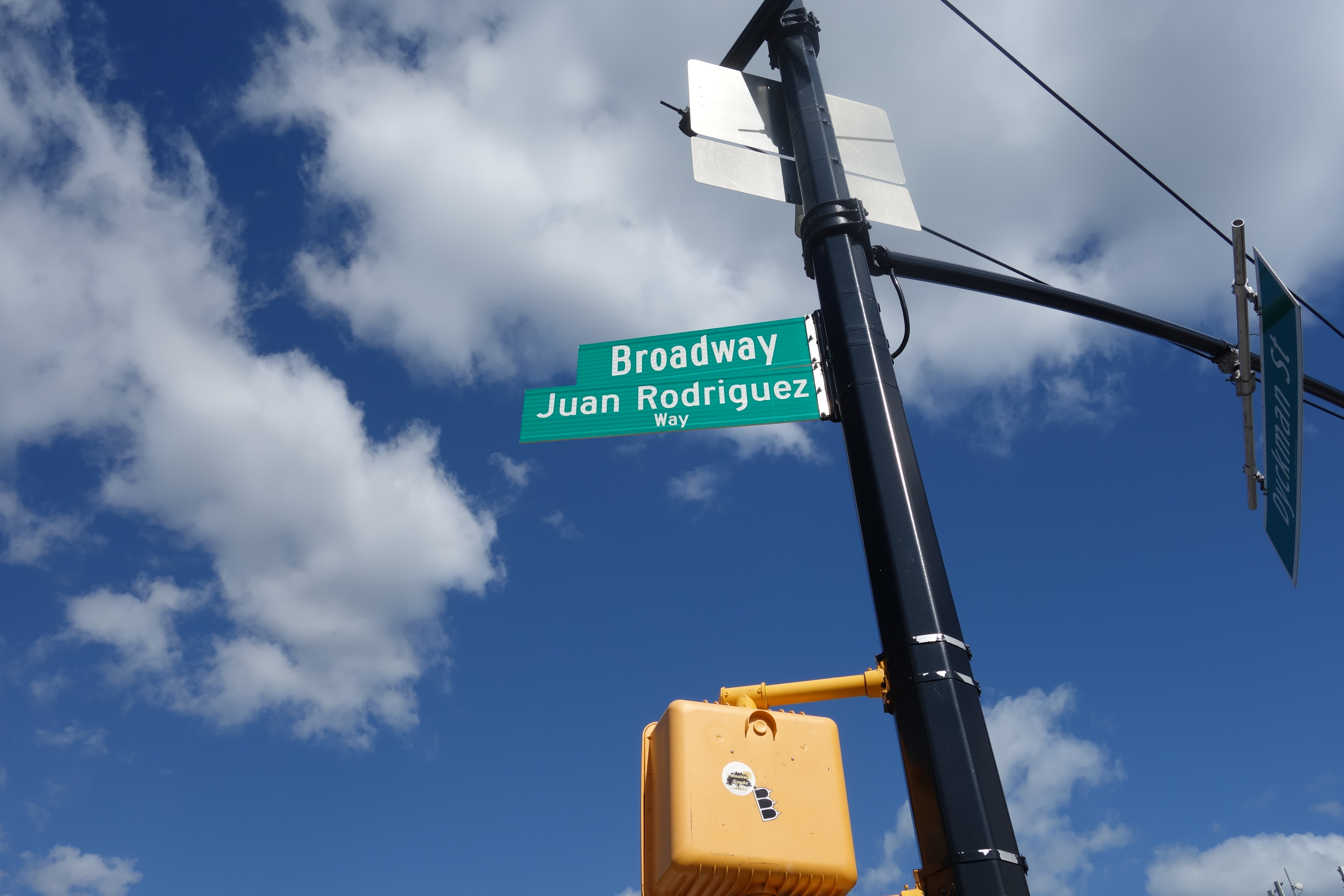
A sign for Juan Rodriguez Way in Inwood, Manhattan

In October 2012, the New York City Council enacted legislation to name Broadway from 159th Street to 218th Street in Manhattan after Juan Rodríguez. The neighborhoods of Washington Heights and Inwood in Upper Manhattan have a substantial Dominican community. The first street sign was put up in a celebration with a small ceremony at 167th Street and Broadway on May 15, 2013.

== Fiction ==
Writer John Keene published a brief, fictional version of Juan Rodríguez's (Jan Rodrigues's) story, entitled "Mannahatta", focusing on the trader's decision to flee the Dutch, in the Winter/Spring 2014 issue of the literary journal TriQuarterly. A revised version of the story appears in his 2015 collection Counternarratives, published by New Directions.

== See also ==
- Dorothy Creole
- Nachtegaal (ship)
