= Cattus Island Park =

County park in Toms River, New Jersey

Cattus Island County Park & Cooper Environmental Center
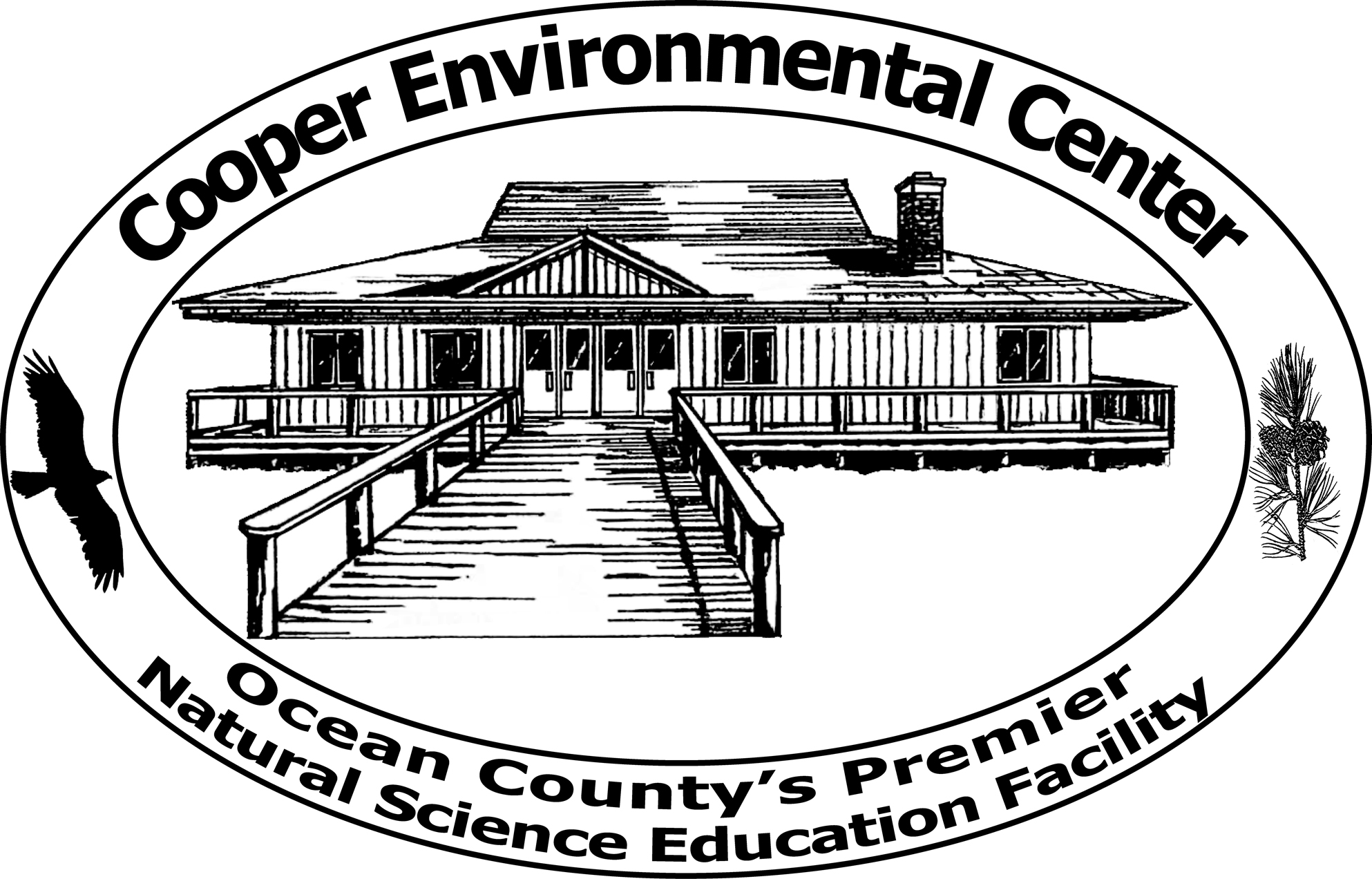
- Interactive map of Cattus Island County Park & Cooper Environmental Center
- Location: 1170 Cattus Island Blvd
- Nearest city: Toms River, New Jersey
- Coordinates: 39°58′40″N 74°08′01″W
- Area: 530 acres (2 km^{2})
- Operator: Ocean County, New Jersey
- Open: Year-round, Dawn to Dusk
- Status: Open
- Water: Barnegat Bay, Applegate Cove, Silver Bay, Mosquito Cove
- Website: Cattus Island County Park

Cattus Island County Park, also known as Cattus Island, is a 530 acres (2 km^{2}) passive recreational park located in Toms River, New Jersey. Cattus Island is a park of the Ocean County Department of Parks and Recreation. Cattus Island is home to the Cooper Environmental Center, an educational center which displays collections of local wildlife including birds, reptiles, and aquatic animals. The center also provides educational programs and presentations to the public and organized groups.

== History ==
=== Early history ===
The first European explorer to set foot on what became Ocean County soil was Captain Cornelius Hendrickson, who, in 1615, explored the New Jersey coast in his ship, the Onrust (or Restless), between the latitudes 38 and 40 degrees. He sailed down Barnegat Bay and located the 300 acres (1.2 km^{2}) that makes of over half of the current park. William Dockwra, Secretary and Registrar for the Board of Proprietors in England, bought the land in the 1680s. The land has remained a single parcel since 1690, when the Board of Proprietors of the Province of East Jersey divided this coastal region.

In 1758, Joseph Page purchased the land. The Page family had settled the island by 1763, farming sheep, flax, and corn crops. Timothy Page, born on the island during that year, served in the local militia during the American Revolution. During the American Revolution, local residents used the area to bring British vessels that had been captured, or had run aground in the deceptive shallows of the Barnegat Bay, into the Toms River to offload their cargoes. Homesteaders also used the island for farming.

After the death of Timothy Page, the family house burned down, and the property was sold to Lewis Applegate. He moved there in 1842, and developed the southeastern section of the island, now named for him. He built a sawmill and a port for lumber boats. The island was sold again in 1867, and was slated to be developed as a resort, but the 1873 depression canceled the project.

=== Cattus ownership to present ===
John V. A. Cattus, a New York importer and Olympic class athlete, bought the land and developed it as a retreat in 1895. Hunting and fishing were the favorite sports of Cattus and his friends. He built a hunting lodge on the island, along with a farm, boat house and boat dock. When Cattus died in 1964, his sons sold the land to local developers.

In the 1970s, the New Jersey Division of Parks and Forestry pushed for laws to limit development in wetlands and along the coast. In 1973, Ocean County purchased this 497 acres (2.01 km^{2}) land. The property was acquired with county tax money and state "Green Acres" funds. In 1980, the park opened to the public with the county's first environmental center.

In 2012, Hurricane Sandy struck and the park sustained significant damage. Thousands of hours of labor were required to remove downed trees and debris that littered the park. In the immediate years following, several local boy scouts cleaned up the park and built sections of boardwalk and benches for park patrons as part of their Eagle Scout projects.

== Park ecosystems ==
Cattus Island Park has within it a number of different ecosystems, though a majority is considered a maritime upland forest. This forest consists mostly of oak trees and pine trees, such as the pitch pine and the shortleaf pine. Even though Cattus Island Park is a maritime forest, within it, one can find many of the same shrubs and animal species that are native to the Pine Barrens.

The park also contains freshwater wetlands. These wetlands are dominated by hardwood trees such as red maple, Swamp Maple, Black Gum, and a wide variety of others. There are a few small stands of living Atlantic White Cedar located in some of the wetland areas. However, in this area, large stands of dead Atlantic white cedar also exist. They have been standing dead since the 1930s. Prior to the 1930s, the northern part of the Barnegat Bay, where Cattus Island is located, was mainly fresh water. After the Point Pleasant Canal was constructed and the Manasquan Inlet improved, saltwater from the ocean infiltrated the northern portion of the bay. As a result, the Atlantic white cedar, which is an obligate freshwater species, was killed.

Another ecosystem that thrives within the park is a vast track of salt marsh, which contains several species of Spartina grasses. It is from these salt marshes that Cattus Island gets part of its name. Several times a year the marshes flood as a result of snowmelt, storms, or high tides. During the floods, the second bit of upland is completely inaccessible; hence, it becomes an 'island'.

== Cooper Environmental Center ==
The Cooper Environmental Center, named for a well-known county environmentalist, A. Morton Cooper, is an educational facility and resource for conservation and education, featuring a 5,000 sq ft (460 m^{2}) building with an eighty-seat meeting room, interactive exhibit area, and live native reptiles and fish.

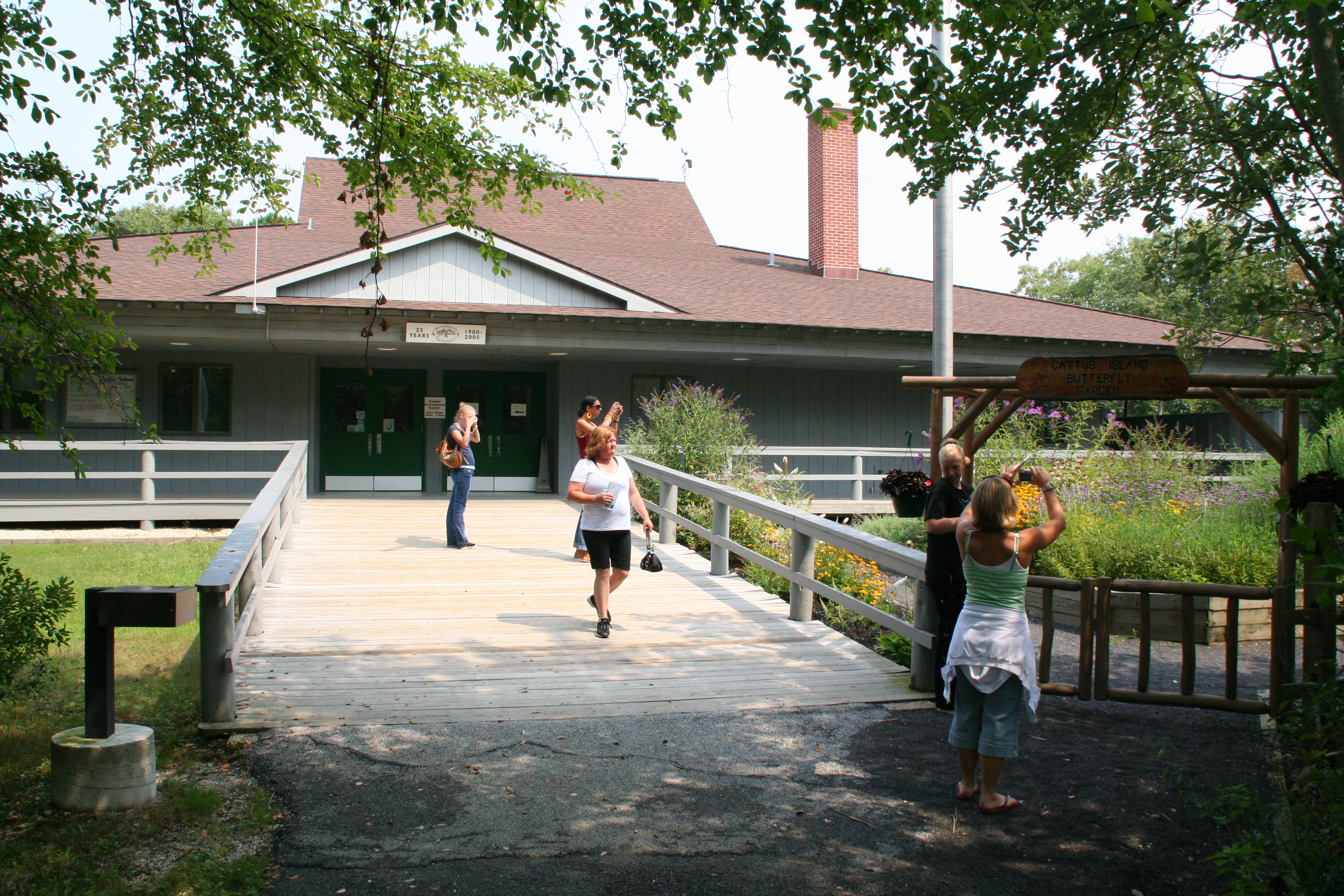

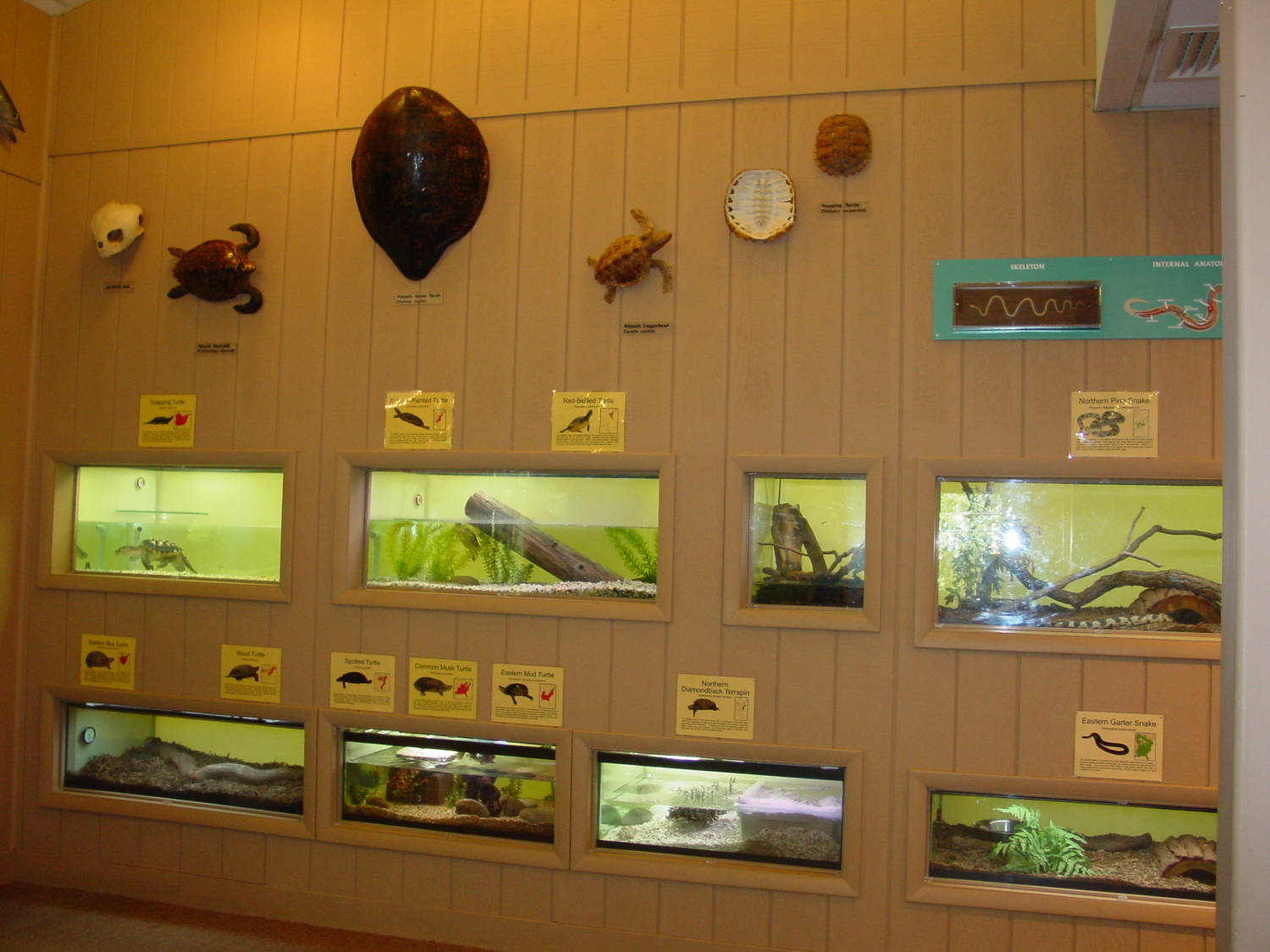

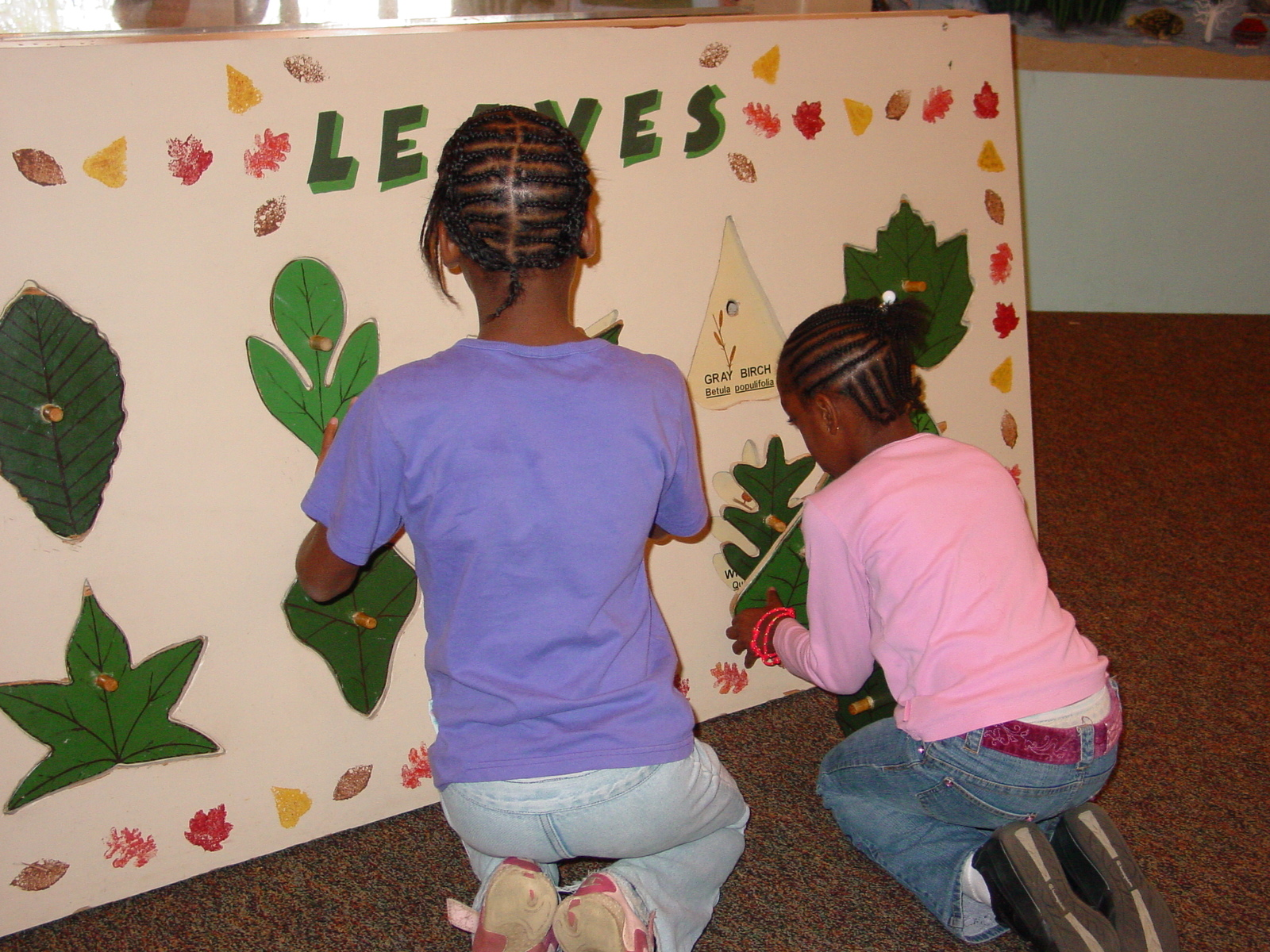
