= Cornelius Hendrickson =

17th-century Dutch mariner and explorer

Cornelius Hendrickson was a Dutch mariner and explorer who charted the North American coastline near present-day New Jersey.

== Early life ==
Cornelius Hendrickson was born around 1572, the son of Lambert Barrentje Hendrickson, an admiral in the Dutch Navy. Nicknamed "Pretty Lambert", the admiral was a friend and associate of Admiral Jacob van Heemskerk, and commanded De Tijger in the Battle of Gibraltar of April 1607.

== Onrust ==
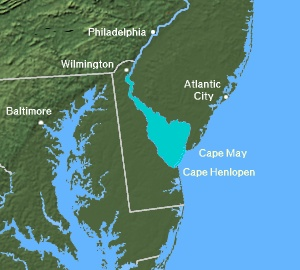
Delaware Bay

In November 1613, Dutch fur trader Adrian Block was preparing to return to Holland with a cargo of furs when his ship, the Tyger, caught fire and was destroyed while moored in the North River near the tip of Manhattan Island. Over the winter, Block and his crew built the Onrust (Restless), which he used to explore the East River and Long Island Sound. The Onrust was 44.5 feet (13.6 m) long with a capacity of 16 tons. Later that year, Block rendezvoused with Hendrick Christiaensen off Cape Cod. Before boarding the Fortuyn to return to the Netherlands, Block turned the Onrust over to Hendrickson.

In 1614, Hendrickson navigated the Onrust, through Barnegat Inlet to the Toms River, which he charted, along with Barnegat Bay, and Great Bay to the south.

In mid-to-late 1615, Hendrickson sailed into Godins Bay (Delaware Bay) and up the Zuyd Rivier (South River) to the Schuylkill River, searching for a site to establish a trading post for the Dutch West India Company. Hendricksz's voyage was made aboard the IJseren Vercken (Iron Hog), a vessel built in America.

During the winter of 1614–1615, some Dutch sailors remained at Fort Nassau to engage in the fur trade. Interested in the benefit of Dutch firearms, the Mohawk persuaded three to accompany them on a raid against the Susquehannocks. That spring the sailors were captured by the Susquehannocks who brought them south. In the course of his explorations Hendrickson he met a band of Susquehannock (Minquas) and ransomed the three for kettles, beads, and trade goods. In 1616, in Amsterdam, he filed the first definitive map of the New Jersey coastline.

He died in 1650, in Utrecht.
