= Tyger (ship) =

17th-century Dutch sailing ship

History

Dutch Republic
- Name: Tyger
- Owner: Van Tweenhuysen Company
- Fate: Accidentally destroyed by fire in November 1613

General characteristics
- Length: 80 ft (24 m)
- Crew: 18 men
- Armament: 6 or 8 1,500/1,600-pound cannons

Tyger (Dutch pronunciation: [ˈtɛiɣər]; English: Tiger) was the ship used by the Dutch captain Adriaen Block during his 1613 voyage to explore the East Coast of North America and the present-day Hudson River. Its remains were uncovered in 1916 during the construction of the New York City Subway on land that is now part of the World Trade Center complex.

== History ==
In the late summer of 1613, Tyger had moored in Lower Manhattan on the Hudson River to trade with the Lenape Indians, alongside its partner ship, Hendrick Christiaensen's Fortuyn. By November, Tyger had been filled with pelts of beaver, otter, and other skins obtained in barter.

In November, an accidental fire broke out and Tyger rapidly burned to the waterline. The charred hull was beached and all but a small section of the prow and keel remained in that location, buried beneath what later became the intersection of Greenwich and Dey Streets in Lower Manhattan. During the fire, the crew salvaged some sails, rope, tools and fittings.

Over the winter, Block and his men – presumably with help from the Indians – built Onrust (Restless), which they used to explore the East River and Long Island Sound before returning to Europe in 1614.

== Rediscovery ==
The shore of Manhattan was expanded through landfill in the centuries following the fire.

In 1916, workmen led by James A. Kelly uncovered the prow and keel of Tyger while excavating an extension for the New York City Subway BMT Broadway Line near the intersection of Greenwich and Dey Streets. The ship and some related artifacts were discovered by Kelly's crew at a depth of about 20 feet (6.1 m) below the street – right where it had been beached on the shoreline of Manhattan Island at the time of the ship's burning. Over the following 150 years, approximately 11 feet (3.4 m) of silt had accumulated on top of it, and in 1763 a waterfront fill-in project added another 8 to 9 feet (2.4 to 2.7 m).

Although the excavation crew was under great pressure to keep the pace of work on schedule, Kelly persuaded his supervisors to allow sufficient excavation to remove about 8 1/2 feet (2.6 m) of prow and keel with three of the hull's ribs. The timbers were placed in the seal tank of the New York Aquarium in Battery Park. In 1943, they were presented to the Museum of the City of New York for exhibition in the Marine Gallery.

The remainder of the ship may still rest approximately 20 feet (6.1 m) below ground, due east of the former site of the North Tower of the World Trade Center; however, it might have been dug up in the process of building the World Trade Center. Also, Tyger appears not to have been the only ship wrecked on the World Trade Center site.

== See also ==
- Juan (Jan) Rodriguez
- Lower Manhattan expansion
- New Netherland
