= Onrust =

History
- Laid down: Winter 1614

General characteristics
- Length: 44.5 ft (13.6 m)
- Capacity: 16 tons

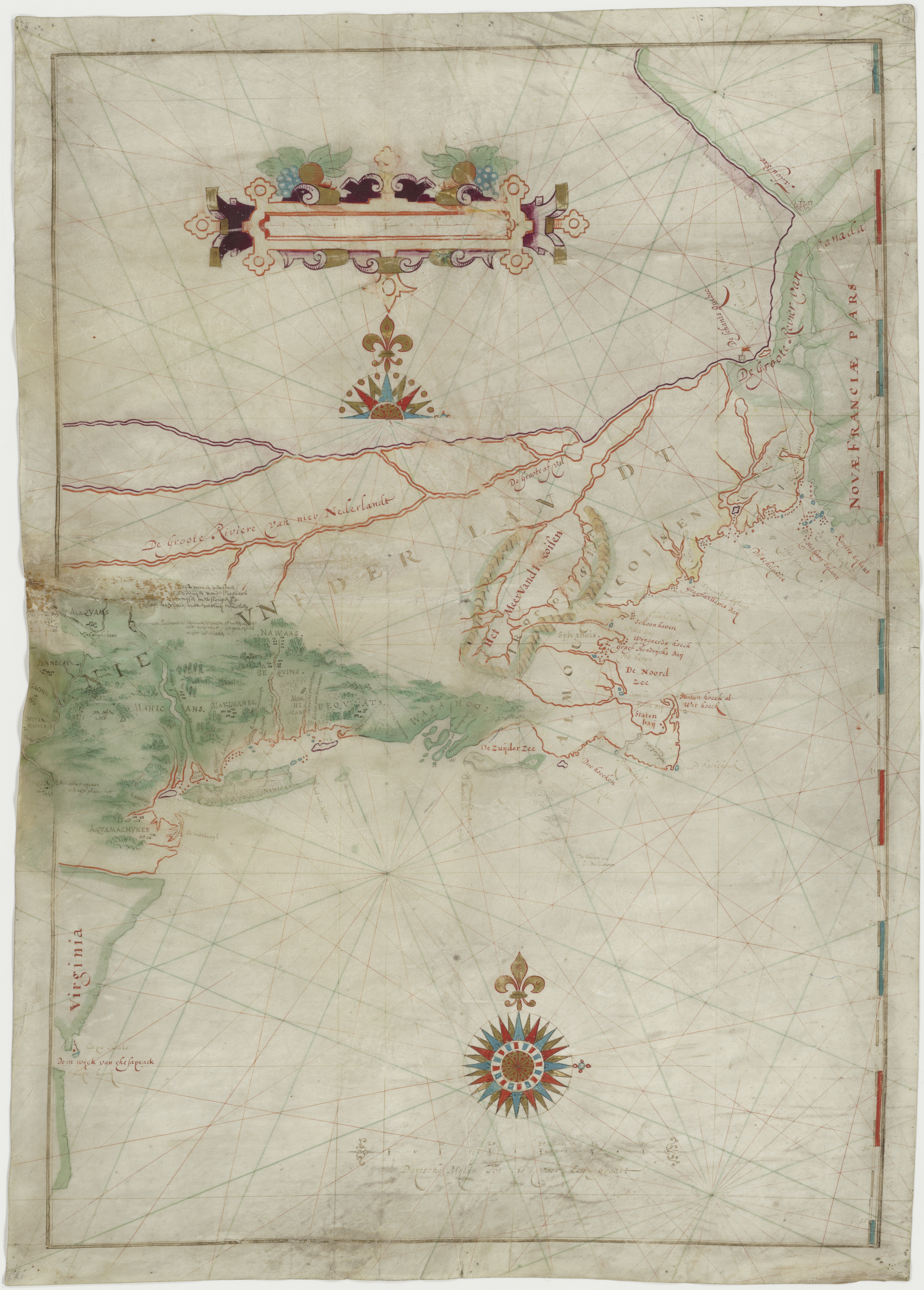
New Netherland as charted by Block in 1614

The Onrust (Dutch pronunciation: [ˈɔnrʏst]; English: Restless) was a Dutch ship built by Adriaen Block and the crew of the Tyger, which had been destroyed by fire in the winter of 1613. The Onrust was the first ship to be built in what is now New York State, and the first fur trading vessel built in America. The construction took four months in the winter of 1614 somewhere in New York Bay. Help from the local Native population is surmised based on the relationship developed by Juan Rodriguez, left on the island during a previous voyage. The Onrust was 44.5 feet long and capable of carrying 16 tons.

In 1614, Block sailed through the whirlpools (Hellegat) on the East River, and into Long Island Sound. There he named Block Island for himself. Block was also the first European to venture up the Connecticut River. He managed to get as far as the Enfield rapids, about 60 miles up the river. Besides finding several inland water routes, creating trading networks and mapping native villages, the two first accurate maps of the east coast were drawn based on the voyages of the Onrust. Later in the year, Block rendezvoused with the Fortuyn, also under his command, near Cape Cod and sailed back to the Netherlands on 1 October 1614. The Onrust was last reported in 1616 as headed to explore the "New River", now known as the Delaware River under Cornelius Hendrickson.

== Onrust Project ==
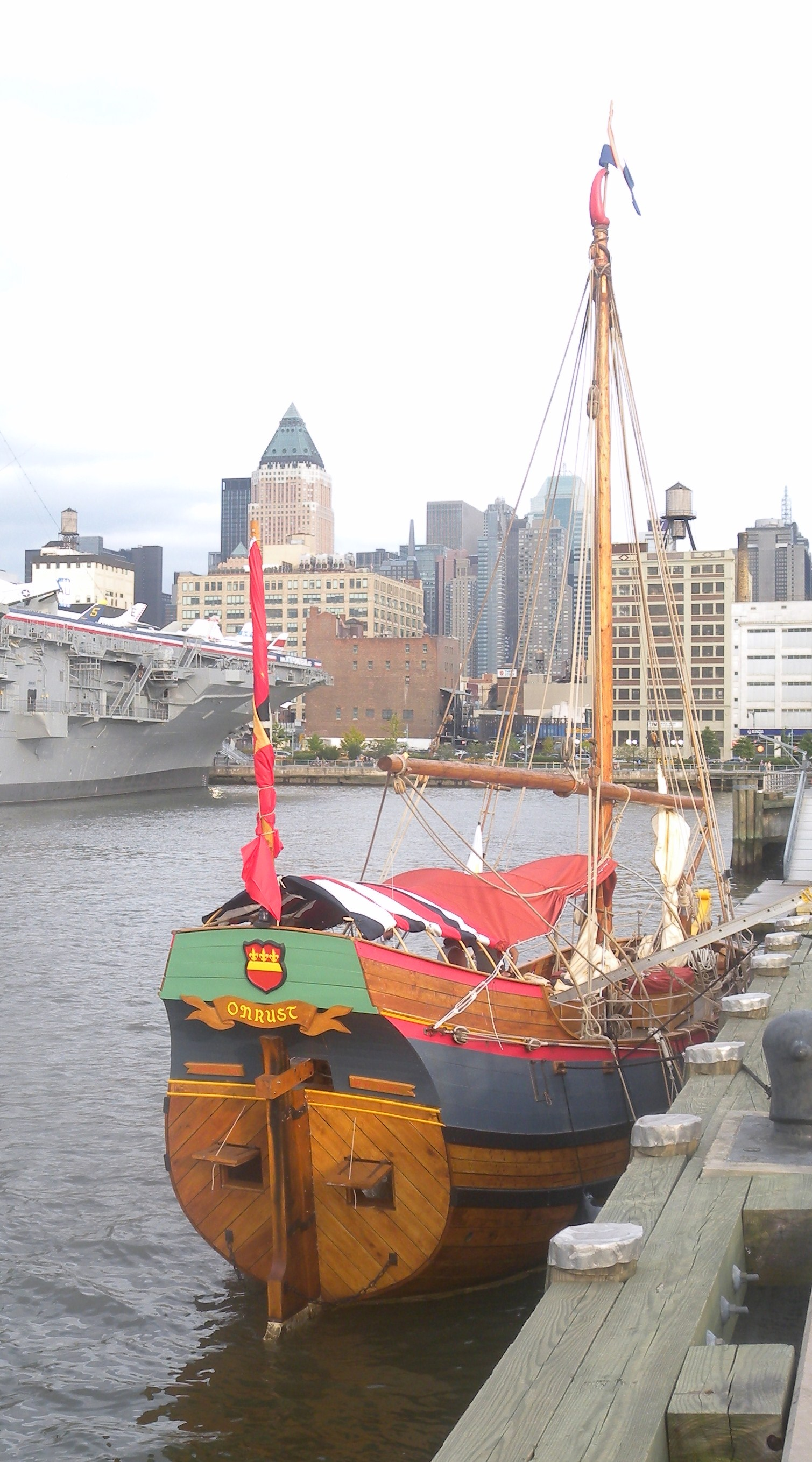
Onrust replica in Manhattan for NY400 in 2009.

From 2006 to 2009 the Onrust Project, a non-profit organization, directed by Don Rittner and Greta Wagle, built a replica of the Onrust at the Schenectady County Historical Society's Mabee Farm Historic Site in Rotterdam Junction, NY. Master shipwright and naval architect Gerald DeWeerdt of the Netherlands, and shipwright Howard Mittleman of North River Restorations in Schenectady, N.Y. led the team of volunteers.

Construction used both modern power tools and traditional hand tools to build the ship, employing authentic 17th century Dutch ship building techniques rediscovered by ship archeologists in the Netherlands. The material is mostly white oak with pine decking, most of which was sawn nearby by one of the volunteers. The replica is held together by more than 4,000 hand-made black locust tree nails called trunnels and iron rivets. Much of the metal fittings and rivets were hand-made by local blacksmiths of wrought iron; others, as well as cannon, use authentic bronze.

The replica Onrust was first launched into the Mohawk River on May 20, 2009, and was able to participate in NY400 that year, commemorating the 400th anniversary of Henry Hudson's voyage.
