= Hendrick Christiaensen =

Dutch explorer

Hendrick Christiaensen was a Dutch explorer who was involved in the earlier exploration of what became the colony of New Netherland.

== Life ==
Hendrick Christiaensen was a ship captain and fur trader employed by the Van Tweenhuysen Company of Amsterdam.

In 1611 Christiaensen paid two visits to Manhattan in his ship Fortuyn, including one with fellow explorer Adriaen Block on his ship, Tyger. Upon his return to the Dutch Republic in 1612, he brought back with him two young Native Americans who were the sons of a local sachem. The Dutch were fascinated with the boys, whom they called Orson and Valentine Christiaensen.

In 1613 Christiaensen and Block returned in the two vessels, and created the first map of the region that showed Manhattan and Long Island as separate geographical entities. The map was used by Dutch traders to petition to Holland's States General to grant Amsterdam Company an exclusive charter. It was issued on October 11, 1614 granting the "exclusive right of occupation and trade for three years." The charter declared the land between Canada and what is now known as Virginia as New Amsterdam.

== Fort Nassau ==
In 1614 Christiensen sailed the Fortuyn up the North River to Castle Island (New York), where he built a warehouse on the ruins of an old abandoned French fur trader's fort. He added a stockade and a moat eighteen feet wide. He named it Fort Nassau in honor of stadtholder Maurice of Nassau. The river, sometimes known as the Mauritius was also named after Maurice. Christiensen took two cannon and eleven swivel guns from the Fortuyn and left twelve men under the command of Jacob Eelkens, before returning downriver.

In the spring of 1619 Christiaensen's ship, the Swarte Beer, was lying in the Hudson River when his ship was surprised by Indians. In the attack Hendrick Christiaensen and the greater part of his crew were killed. The survivors succeeded in driving away the Indians from the ship by two shots from the guns.

== See also ==
- Fort Nassau (North River)
- Two Row Wampum Treaty
- Adrian Jorisszen Tienpoint
