= New Netherland =

17th-century Dutch colony in North America

New Netherland (New Orange 1673-1674) Nieuw Nederland
- 1614–1667; 1673–1674
- Seal (Note: Inscribed around the heraldic beaver with a Neo-Latin translation of the name as Novum Belgium ("(New) Belgium" here referring to the original Dutch region). Also seen in Latin translations as Nova Belgica or Neerlandia.)

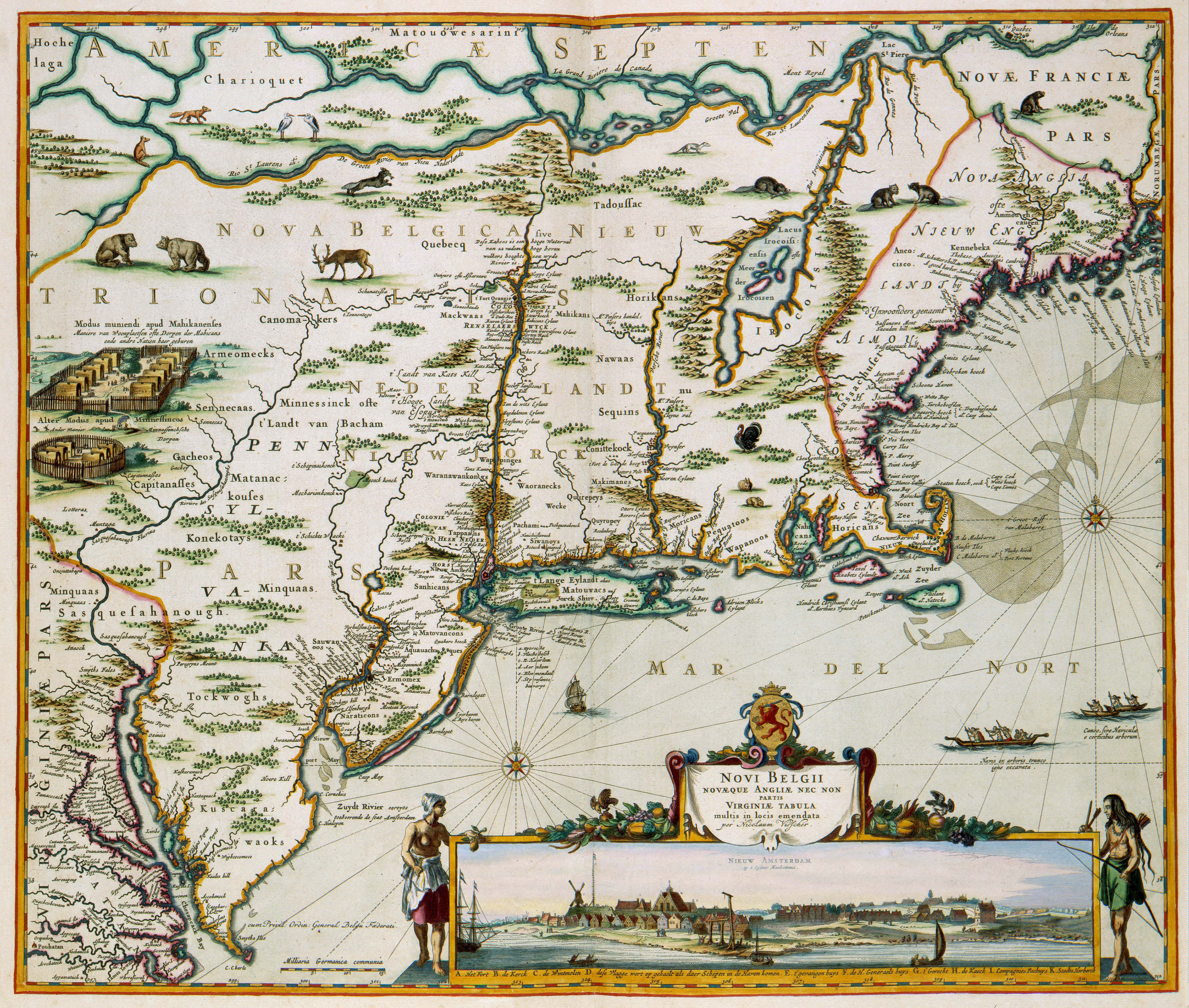
- New Netherland map published by Nicolaes Visscher II (1649–1702)
- Status: Colony (Dutch colonial empire)
- Capital: New Amsterdam
- Official languages: Dutch
- Minority languages: Low Saxon, French, English, Algonquian, Delaware
- Religion: Dutch Reformed
- Demonyms: New Netherlander; New Dutch

Government
  - Director: (List)

Establishment
  - Establishment of the first settlers: 1614
  - Capture of New Amsterdam: August 27, 1664
  - Treaty of Breda: July 23, 1667
  - Reconquest of New Netherland: August 9, 1673
  - Treaty of Westminster: February 19, 1674

Population
  - Estimate: 350 (in 1630); 4,301 (in 1650); 9,000 (in 1674)
- Currency: Dutch rijksdaalder, leeuwendaalder
Preceded by
Lenapehoking
Succeeded by
Province of New York
Province of New Jersey
Province of Pennsylvania
Delaware Colony
Connecticut Colony
Colony of Rhode Island and Providence Plantations
- Today part of: United States; Connecticut; Delaware; New Jersey; New York; Pennsylvania

New Netherland (Dutch: Nieuw Nederland) was a colony of the Dutch Republic located on the East Coast of what is now the United States. The claimed territories extended from the Delmarva Peninsula to Cape Cod. Settlements were established in what became the states of New York, New Jersey, Delaware, and Connecticut, with small outposts in Pennsylvania and Rhode Island.

The colony was originally conceived by the Dutch West India Company in 1621 to capitalize on the North American fur trade. Settlement initially stalled because of policy mismanagement by the company and conflicts with Native Americans. The settlement of New Sweden by the Swedish South Company encroached on its southern flank, while its eastern border was redrawn to accommodate the English colonies of an expanding New England Confederation.

The colony experienced dramatic growth during the 1650s and became a major center for trade across the North Atlantic. The Dutch conquered New Sweden in 1655, but during the Second Anglo-Dutch War, the Dutch surrendered New Netherland to England following the capture of New Amsterdam in 1664. In 1673, the Dutch retook the colony but relinquished it under the Treaty of Westminster (1674) that ended the Third Anglo-Dutch War.

The inhabitants of New Netherland (New Netherlanders) were European colonists, Native Americans, and Africans imported as slave laborers. Not including Native Americans, the colonial population, many of whom were not of Dutch descent, was 4,301 in 1650 and 8,000 to 9,000 at the time of transfer to England in 1674.

== Origin ==
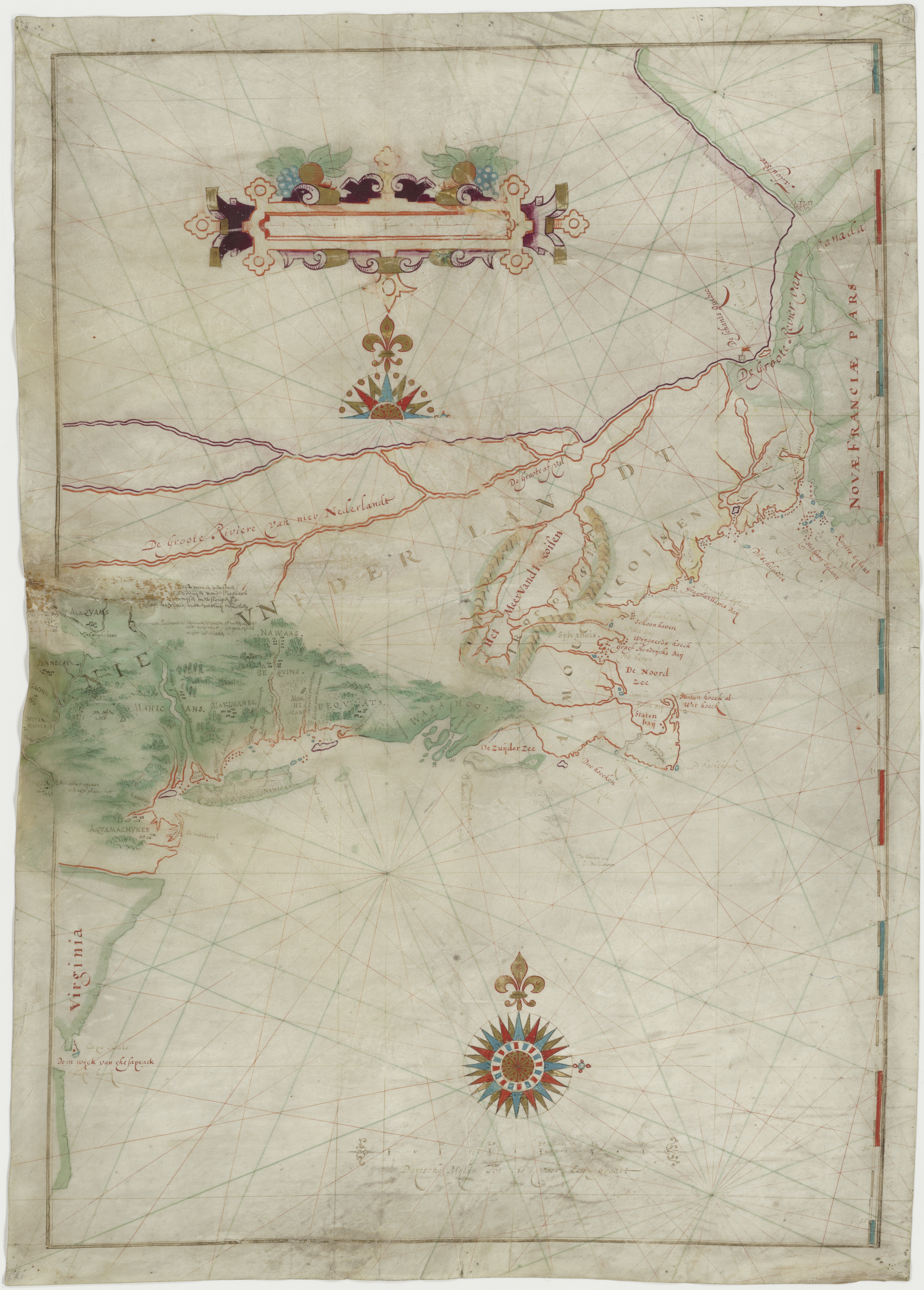
A map based on Adriaen Block's 1614 expedition to New Netherland, featuring the first use of the name. It was created by Dutch cartographers in the Golden Age of Dutch exploration (c. 1590s–1720s) and Netherlandish cartography (c. 1570s–1670s).

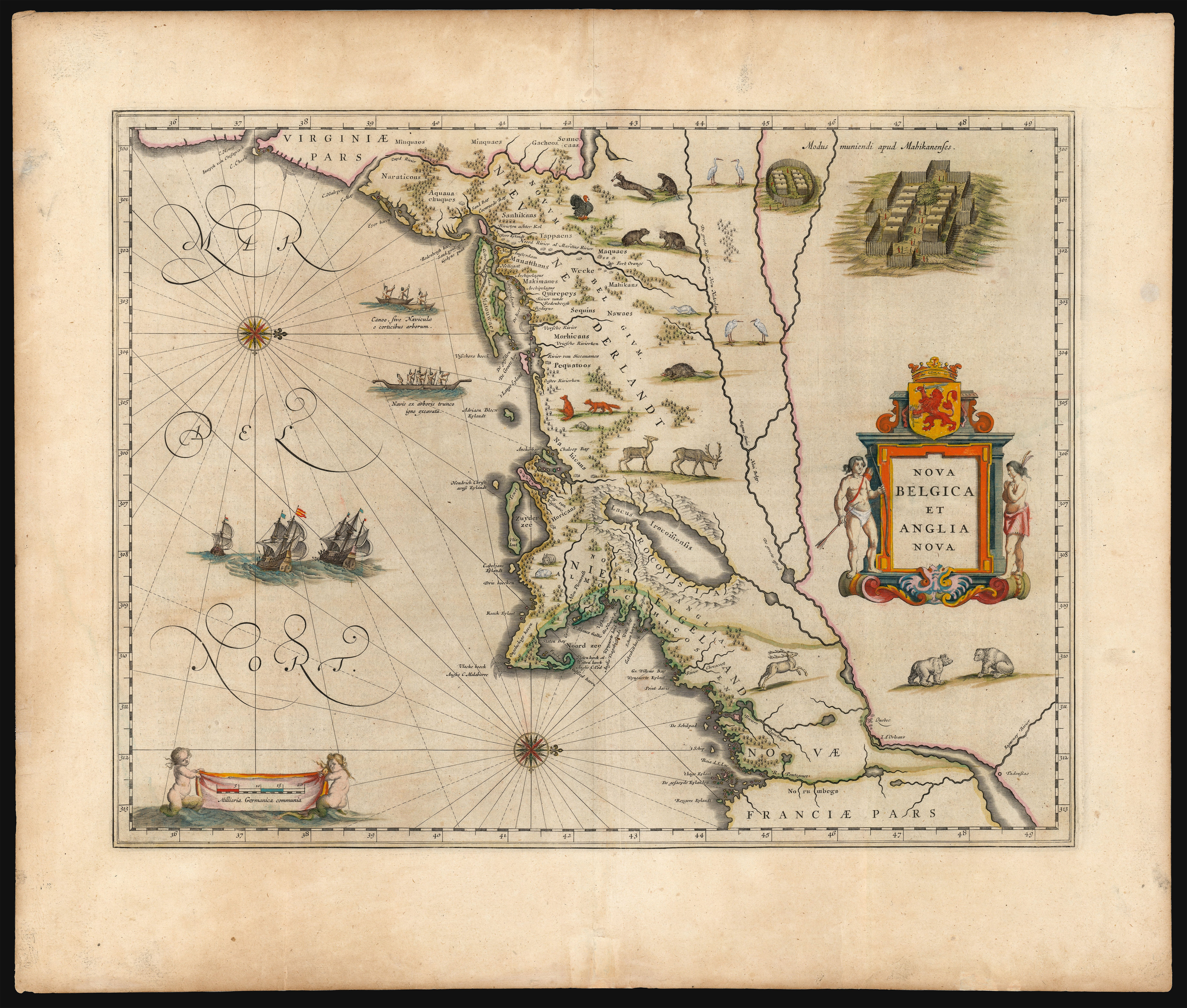
A map of New Netherland and New England, with north to the right

In the 17th century, Europe was undergoing expansive social, cultural, and economic growth, known as the Dutch Golden Age in the Netherlands. Nations vied for domination of lucrative trade routes around the globe, particularly those to Asia. Simultaneously, philosophical and theological conflicts were manifested in military battles throughout the European continent. The Dutch Republic had become a home to many intellectuals, international businessmen, and religious refugees. In the Americas, the English had a settlement at Jamestown, Virginia, the French had small settlements at Port Royal and Quebec, and the Spanish were developing colonies in South America and the Caribbean.

In 1609, English sea captain and explorer Henry Hudson was hired by the Dutch East India Company (VOC, from Dutch Vereenigde Oostindische Compagnie) to find a Northeast Passage to Asia, sailing around Scandinavia and Russia. The ice of the Arctic turned him back in his second attempt, so he sailed west to seek a Northwest Passage rather than return home. He ended up exploring the waters off the northeast coast of North America aboard the flyboat Halve Maen. His first landfall was at Newfoundland, and the second at Cape Cod.

Hudson believed that the passage to the Pacific Ocean was between the St. Lawrence River and Chesapeake Bay, so he sailed south to the Bay, then turned northward, traveling close along the shore. From Delaware Bay, he began to sail upriver looking for the passage. This effort was foiled by Sandy Shoals, and the Halve Maen continued north along the coast. After passing Sandy Hook, Hudson and his crew entered the Narrows into the Upper New York Bay. Hudson believed that he had found the continental water route, so he sailed up the major river that now bears his name. He found the water too shallow to proceed several days later at the site of Troy, New York.

Upon returning to the Netherlands, Hudson reported that he had found fertile land and amicable people willing to engage his crew in small-scale bartering of furs, trinkets, clothes, and small manufactured goods. His report was first published in 1611 by Emanuel van Meteren, the Dutch Consul at London. This stimulated interest in exploiting this new trade resource, and it was the catalyst for Dutch merchant-traders to fund more expeditions. Merchants such as Arnout Vogels sent the first follow-up voyages to exploit this discovery as early as July 1610.

In 1611–1612, the Admiralty of Amsterdam sent two covert expeditions to find a passage to China with the yachts Craen and Vos, captained by Jan Cornelisz Mey and Symon Willemsz Cat, respectively. Adriaen Block, Hendrick Christiaensen, and Cornelius Jacobsen May explored, surveyed, and mapped the area between Maryland and Massachusetts in four voyages made between 1611 and 1614. These surveys and charts were consolidated in Block's map, which used the name New Netherland for the first time; it was also called Nova Belgica on maps. During this period, there was some trading with the Native American population.

Fur trader Juan Rodriguez was born in Santo Domingo of Portuguese and African descent. He arrived in Manhattan during the winter of 1613–1614, trapping for pelts and trading with the Indians as a representative of the Dutch. He was the first recorded non-native inhabitant of what would, in the future, be New York City.

== Development ==
=== Chartered trading companies ===
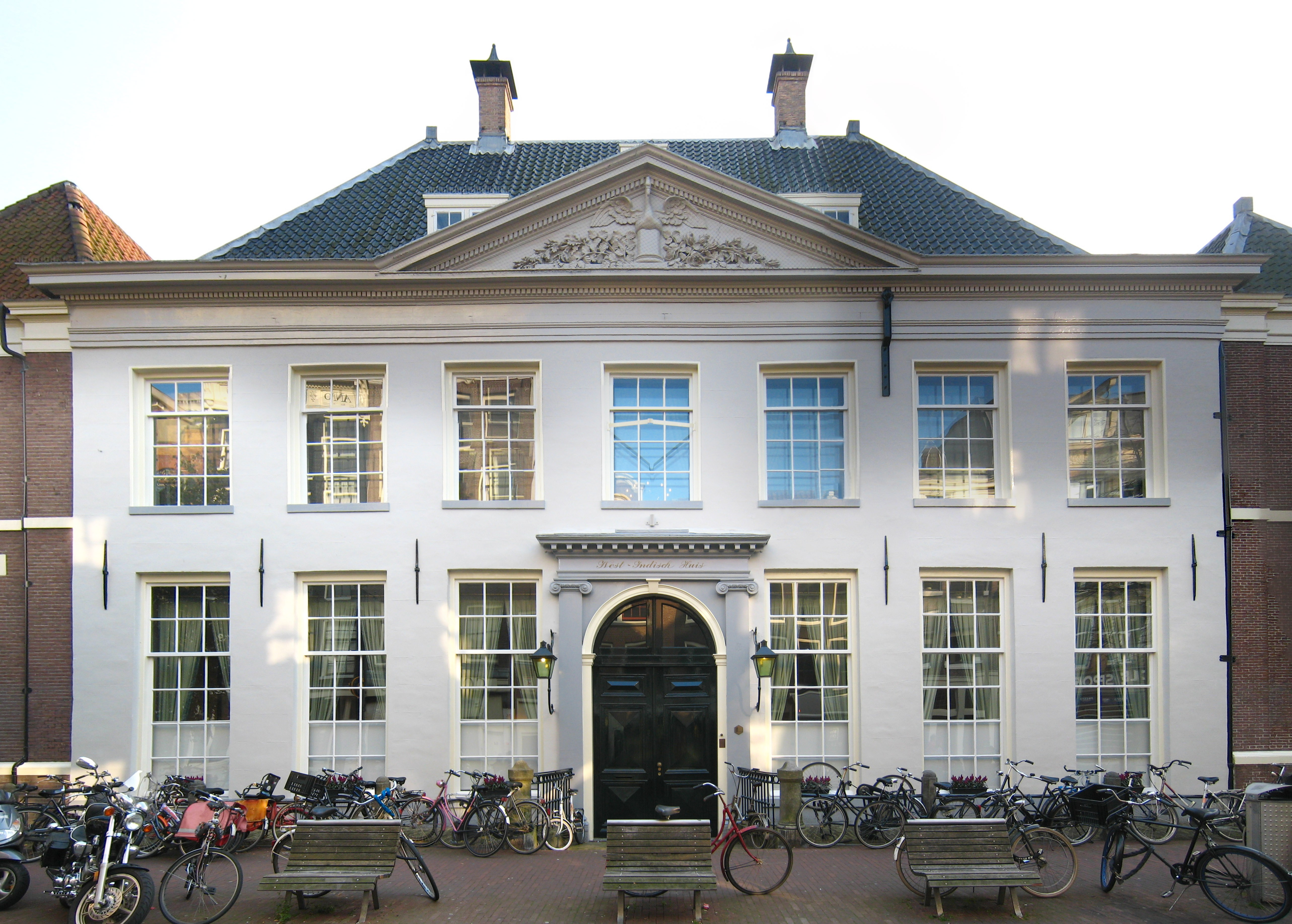
The West India House in Amsterdam, headquarters of the Dutch West India Company from 1623 to 1647

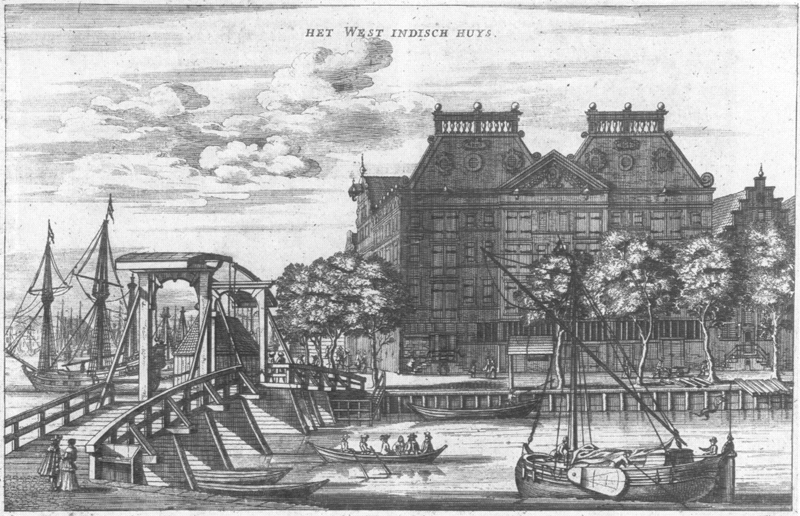
The storehouse of the Dutch West India Company in Amsterdam, built in 1642, became the headquarters of the board in 1647 because of financial difficulties after the loss of Dutch Brazil.

The immediate and intense competition among Dutch trading companies in the newly charted areas led to disputes in Amsterdam and calls for regulation. The States General was the governing body of the Republic of the Seven United Netherlands, and it proclaimed on 17 March 1614, that it would grant an exclusive patent for trade between the 40th and 45th parallels. This monopoly would be valid for four voyages, and all four voyages had to be undertaken within three years of the award. The New Netherland Company was an alliance of trading companies, and they used Adrian Block's map to win a patent that expired on 1 January 1618.

The New Netherland Company also ordered a survey of the Delaware Valley, and Cornelis Hendricksz of Monnickendam explored the Zuyd Rivier (South River) in 1616 from its bay to its northernmost navigable reaches. His observations were preserved in a map drawn in 1616. Hendricksz made his voyages aboard the IJseren Vercken (Iron Hog), a vessel built in America. Despite the survey, the company was unable to secure an exclusive patent from the States General for the area between the 38th and 40th parallels.

The States General issued patents in 1614 for the development of New Netherland as a private, commercial venture. Soon after, traders built Fort Nassau on Castle Island in the area of Albany up Hudson's River. The fort was to defend river traffic against interlopers and to conduct fur trading operations with the Indians. The location of the fort proved to be impractical, however, due to repeated flooding of the island in the summers, and it was abandoned in 1618 when the patent expired.

The Republic of the Seven United Netherlands granted a charter to the Dutch West India Company (GWC, from Dutch Geoctroyeerde Westindische Compagnie) on 3 June 1621, which gave the company the exclusive right to operate in West Africa (between the Tropic of Cancer and the Cape of Good Hope) and the Americas.

Willem Usselincx was one of the founders of the GWC, and he promoted the concept that the company's main goal should be to establish colonies in the New World. In 1620, Usselincx made a last appeal to the States General, which rejected his principal vision as a primary goal. The legislators preferred the formula of trading posts with small populations and a military presence to protect them, which was working in the East Indies, versus encouraging mass immigration and establishing large colonies. The company did not focus on colonization in North America until 1654, when it was forced to surrender Dutch Brazil and forfeit the richest sugar-producing area in the world.

=== Indigenous population ===
The first trading partners of the New Netherlanders were the Algonquins who lived in the area. The Dutch depended on the native nations to capture, skin, and deliver pelts to them, especially beaver. It is likely that Hudson's peaceful contact with the Mohicans encouraged them to establish Fort Nassau in 1614, the first of many garrisoned trading stations. In 1628, the Mohawks, members of the Iroquois Confederacy, conquered the Mahicans, who retreated to Connecticut. The Mohawks gained a near-monopoly in the fur trade with the Dutch, as they controlled the upstate Adirondacks and Mohawk Valley through the center of New York.

The Algonquin Lenape population around New York Bay and along the lower Hudson River were seasonally migrational people. The Dutch called the numerous band collectively the River Indians, known the exonyms associated with place names as the Wecquaesgeek, Hackensacks, Raritans, Canarsee, and Tappans. These groups had the most frequent contact with the New Netherlanders. The Munsee inhabited the Highlands, Hudson Valley, and northern New Jersey, while the Susquehannocks lived west of the Delaware River along the Susquehanna River, which the Dutch regarded as their boundary with Virginia.

Company policy required land to be purchased from the Indians. The Dutch West India Company would offer a land patent, and the recipient would be responsible for negotiating a deal with representatives of the local tribes, usually the sachem, or high chief. The Indians referred to the Dutch colonists as Swannekins (lit. 'salt water people'); they had vastly different conceptions of ownership and use of land than the colonists did, and difficulties sometimes arose concerning the expectations on both sides.

The colonists thought that their proffer of gifts in the form of sewant or manufactured goods was a trade agreement and defense alliance, which gave them exclusive rights to farming, hunting, and fishing. Often, the Indians did not vacate the property or reappeared seasonally according to their migration patterns. They were willing to share the land with the colonists, but the Indians did not intend to leave or give up access. This misunderstanding and other differences led to violent conflict later. At the same time, such differences marked the beginnings of a multicultural society.

=== Early settlement ===
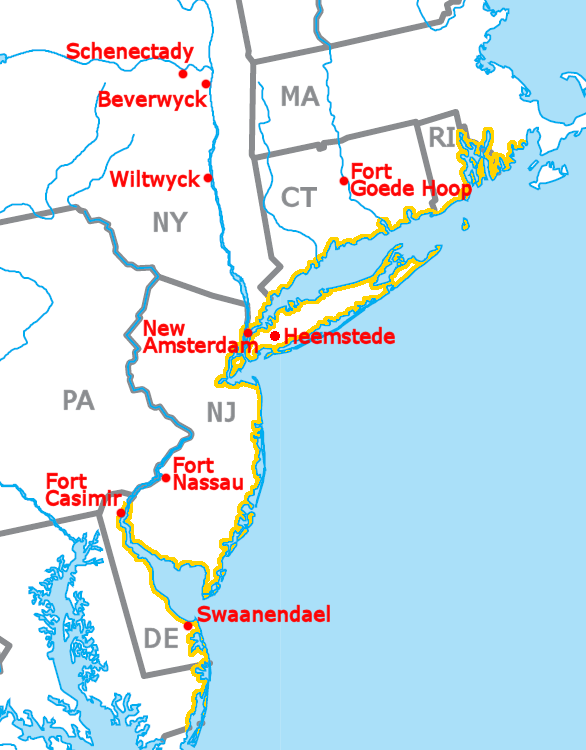
A map showing the area claimed by the Dutch in North America and several Dutch settlements compared to present-day boundaries.

Like the French in the north, the Dutch focused their interest on the fur trade. To that end, they cultivated contingent relations with the Five Nations of the Iroquois to procure greater access to key central regions from which the skins came.

The Dutch encouraged a kind of feudal aristocracy over time to attract settlers to the region of the Hudson River in what became known as the system of the Charter of Freedoms and Exemptions. Further south, a Swedish trading company that had ties with the Dutch tried to establish its first settlement along the Delaware River three years later. Without resources to consolidate its position, New Sweden was gradually absorbed by New Holland and later by Pennsylvania and Delaware.

In 1613 a temporary camp comprising a number of small huts was built by the crew of the "Tijger" (Tiger), a Dutch ship under the command of Captain Adriaen Block, which had caught fire while sailing on the Hudson. Soon after, the first of two Fort Nassau was built at the confluence of the Hudson (North River) and Mohawk rivers, and small factorijen or trading posts went up, where commerce could be conducted with the Algonquian and Iroquois population, possibly at Schenectady, Esopus, Quinnipiac, Communipaw, and elsewhere.

In 1624, New Netherland became a province of the Dutch Republic, which had lowered the northern border of its North American dominion to 42° latitude in acknowledgment of the claim by the English north of Cape Cod. (Note: See John Smith's 1616 map as self-appointed Admiral of New England.) The Dutch named the three main rivers of the province the Zuyd Rivier (South River), the Noort Rivier (North River), and the Versche Rivier (Fresh River). Discovery, charting, and permanent settlement were needed to maintain a territorial claim. To this end, in May 1624, the GWC landed 30 families at Fort Orange and Noten Eylant (today's Governors Island) at the mouth of the North River. They disembarked from the ship Nieu Nederlandt, under the command of Cornelius Jacobsen May, the first director of New Netherland. He was replaced the following year by Willem Verhulst.

In June 1625, 45 additional colonists disembarked on Noten Eylant from three ships named Horse, Cow, and Sheep, which also delivered 103 horses, steers, cows, pigs, and sheep. Most settlers were dispersed to the various garrisons built across the territory: upstream to Fort Orange, to Kievits Hoek on the Fresh River, and Fort Wilhelmus on the South River. Many of the settlers were not Dutch but Walloons, French Huguenots, or Africans (most as enslaved labor, some later gaining "half-free" status).

=== North River and the Manhattan ===
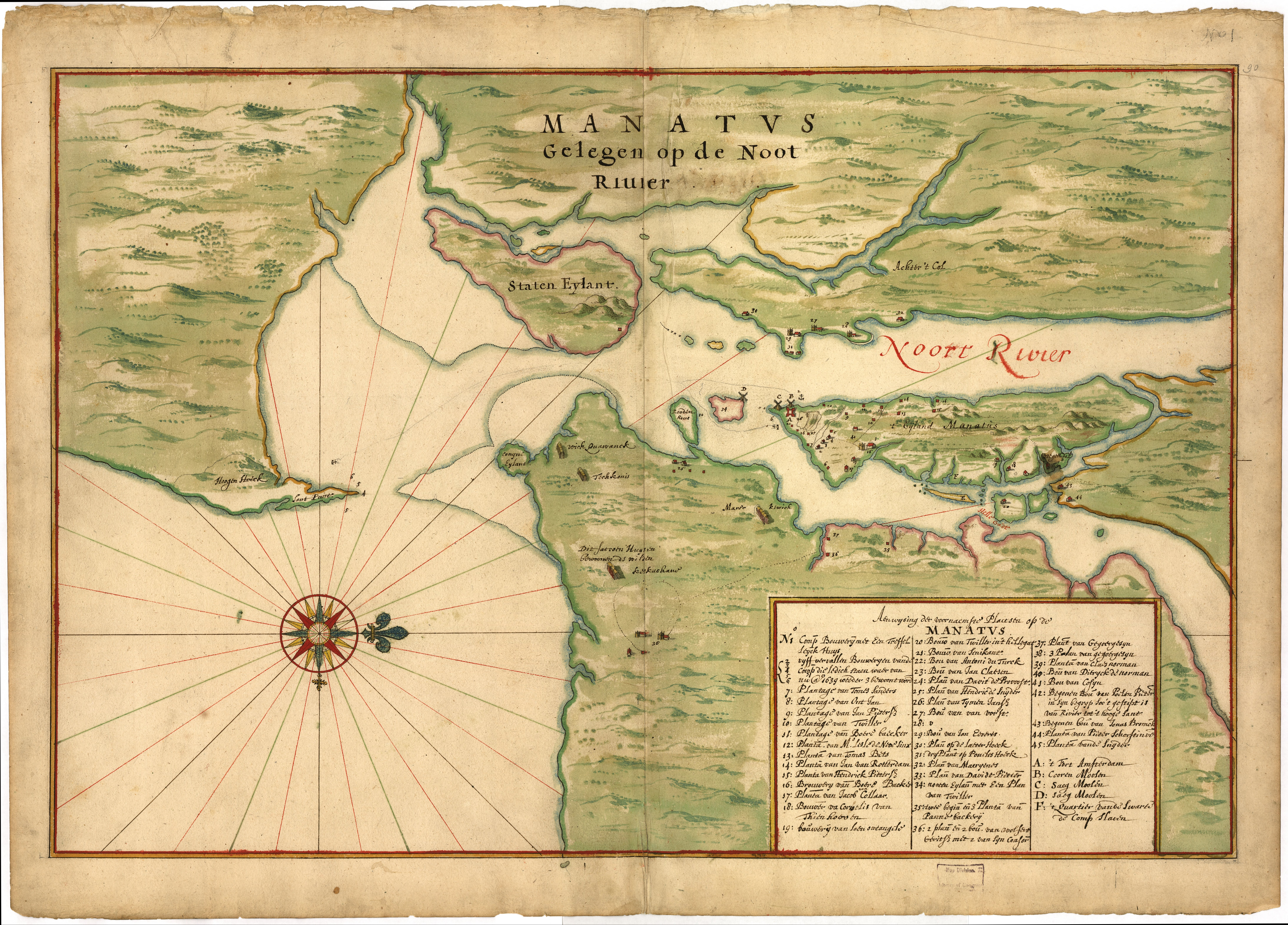
A c. 1639 map, Manatvs gelegen op de Noot Riuier (Manhattan situated on the North River) with the north arrow pointing to the right

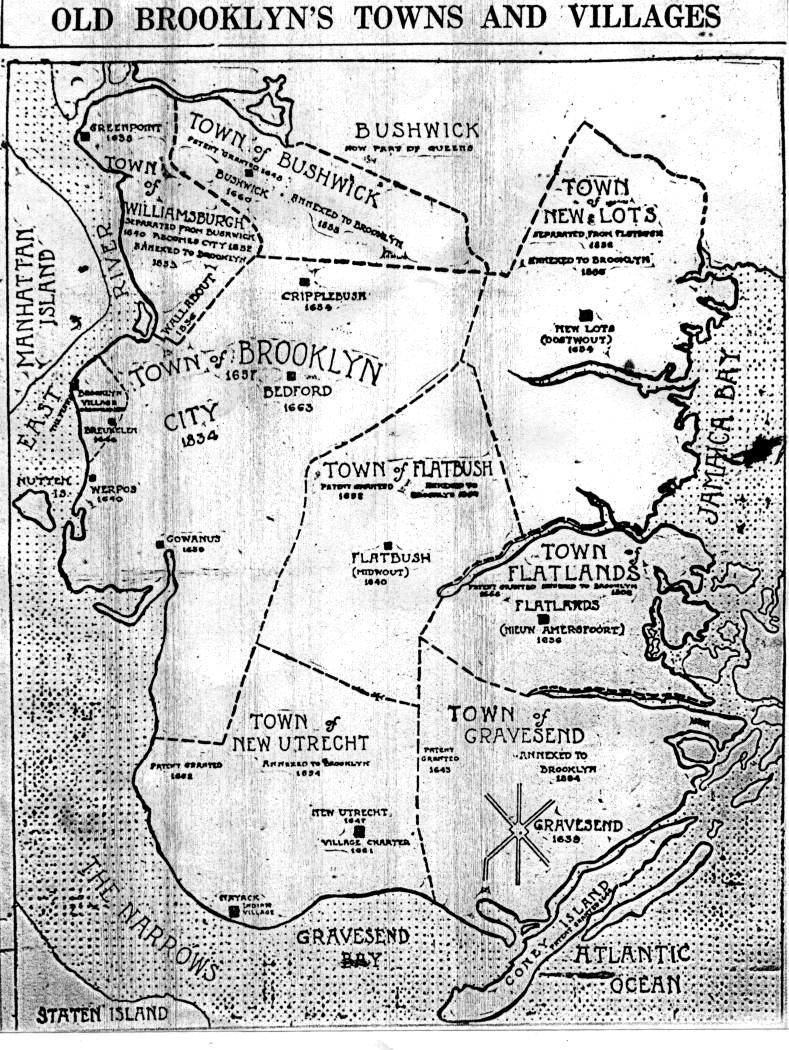
Map of old Brooklyn towns and villages, showing historical towns like Bushwick, Flatbush, and Gravesend

Peter Minuit became director of New Netherland in 1626, arrived in 4 May, and later made a decision that greatly affected the new colony. Originally, the capital of the province was to be located on the South River, but it was soon realized that the location was susceptible to mosquito infestation in the summer and the freezing of its waterways in the winter. He chose instead the island of Manhattan at the mouth of the river explored by Hudson, at that time called the North River.

Minuit traded some goods with the local population and reported that he had purchased them from the natives, as was company policy. He ordered the construction of Fort Amsterdam at its southern tip, around which grew the heart of the province called The Manhattoes in the vocabulary of the day, rather than New Netherland. According to a letter by Pieter Janszoon Schagen, Peter Minuit and Walloon colonists of the West India Company acquired the island of Manhattan on 24 May 1626, from unnamed native people, who are believed to have been Canarsee Indians of the Manhattoe, in exchange for traded goods worth 60 guilders, often said to be worth US$24. The figure of 60 guilders comes from a letter by a representative of the Dutch Estates General and member of the board of the Dutch West India Company, Pieter Janszoon Schagen, to the Estates General in November 1626.

In 1846, New York historian John Romeyn Brodhead converted the figure of Fl 60 (or 60 guilders) to US$24 (he arrived at $24 = Fl 60/2.5, because the US dollar was erroneously equated with the Dutch rijksdaalder having a standard value of 2.5 guilders). "[A] variable-rate myth being a contradiction in terms, the purchase price remains forever frozen at twenty-four dollars," as authors Edwin G. Burrows and Mike Wallace remarked in their history of New York.

In 1626, sixty guilders were valued at approximately $1,000 in 2006 and $963 in 2020, according to the Institute for Social History of Amsterdam. Based on the price of silver, "The Straight Dope" newspaper column calculated an equivalent of $72 in 1992. Historians James and Michelle Nevius revisited the issue in 2014, suggesting that using the prices of beer and brandy as monetary equivalencies, the price Minuit paid would have the purchasing power of somewhere between $2,600 and $15,600 in current dollars. According to the writer Nathaniel Benchley, Minuit conducted the transaction with Seyseys, chief of the Canarsee, who were willing to accept valuable merchandise in exchange for the island that was mostly controlled by the Weckquaesgeeks, a band of the Wappinger.

The port city of New Amsterdam outside the fort walls became a major hub for trade between North America, the Caribbean, and Europe, and where raw materials were loaded, such as pelts, lumber, and tobacco. Sanctioned privateering contributed to its growth. It was given its municipal charter in 1653, by which time the Commonality of New Amsterdam included the isle of Manhattan, Staaten Eylandt, Pavonia, and the Lange Eylandt towns.

In the hope of encouraging immigration, the Dutch West India Company established the Charter of Freedoms and Exemptions in 1629, which gave it the power to offer vast land grants and the title of patroon to some of its invested members. The vast tracts were called patroonships, and the title came with powerful manorial rights and privileges, such as the creation of civil and criminal courts and the appointing of local officials. In return, a patroon was required by the Company to establish a settlement of at least 50 people within four years who would live as tenant farmers. Of the original five patents given, the largest and only truly successful endeavor was Rensselaerswyck, at the highest navigable point on the North River, which became the main thoroughfare of the province. Beverwijck grew from a trading post to a bustling, independent town in the midst of Rensselaerwyck, as did Wiltwyck, south of the patroonship in Esopus country.

=== Kieft's War ===
Willem Kieft was director of New Netherland from 1638 until 1647. During Kieft's administration, the Leiden-trained physician Johannes La Montagne served as the sole member of the director's council from 1638 through 1647. The director and council together exercised executive and legislative powers and constituted the colony's court of justice.The colony had grown somewhat before his arrival, reaching 8,000 population in 1635. Yet it did not flourish, and Kieft was under pressure to cut costs. At this time, Native American groups that had signed mutual defense treaties with the Dutch were gathering near the colony due to widespread warfare and dislocation among the tribes to the north. At first, he suggested collecting tribute from the Native Americans, as was common among the various dominant tribes, but his demands were simply ignored by the Tappan and Wecquaesgeek. Subsequently, a colonist was murdered in an act of revenge for some killings that had taken place years earlier and the Native Americans refused to turn over the perpetrator. Kieft suggested that they be taught a lesson by ransacking their villages. In an attempt to gain public support, he created the Citizens Commission, the Council of Twelve Men.

The Council did not rubber-stamp his ideas, as he had expected them to, but took the opportunity to mention grievances that they had with the company's mismanagement and its unresponsiveness to their suggestions. Kieft thanked and disbanded them and, against their advice, ordered that groups of Tappan and Wecquaesgeek be attacked at Pavonia and Corlear's Hook, even though they had sought refuge from their more powerful Mohican enemies per their treaty understandings with the Dutch. The massacre left 130 dead. Within days, the surrounding tribes united and rampaged through the countryside, in a unique move, forcing settlers who escaped to find safety at Fort Amsterdam. For two years, a series of raids and reprisals raged across the province, until 1645 when Kieft's War ended with a treaty, in a large part brokered by the Hackensack sagamore Oratam.

The colonists were disenchanted with Kieft, his ignorance of Indigenous peoples, and the unresponsiveness of the GWC to their rights and requests, and they submitted the Remonstrance of New Netherland to the States General. This document was written by Leiden-educated New Netherland lawyer Adriaen van der Donck, condemning the GWC for mismanagement and demanding full rights as citizens of the province of the Netherlands.

=== Director-general Stuyvesant ===
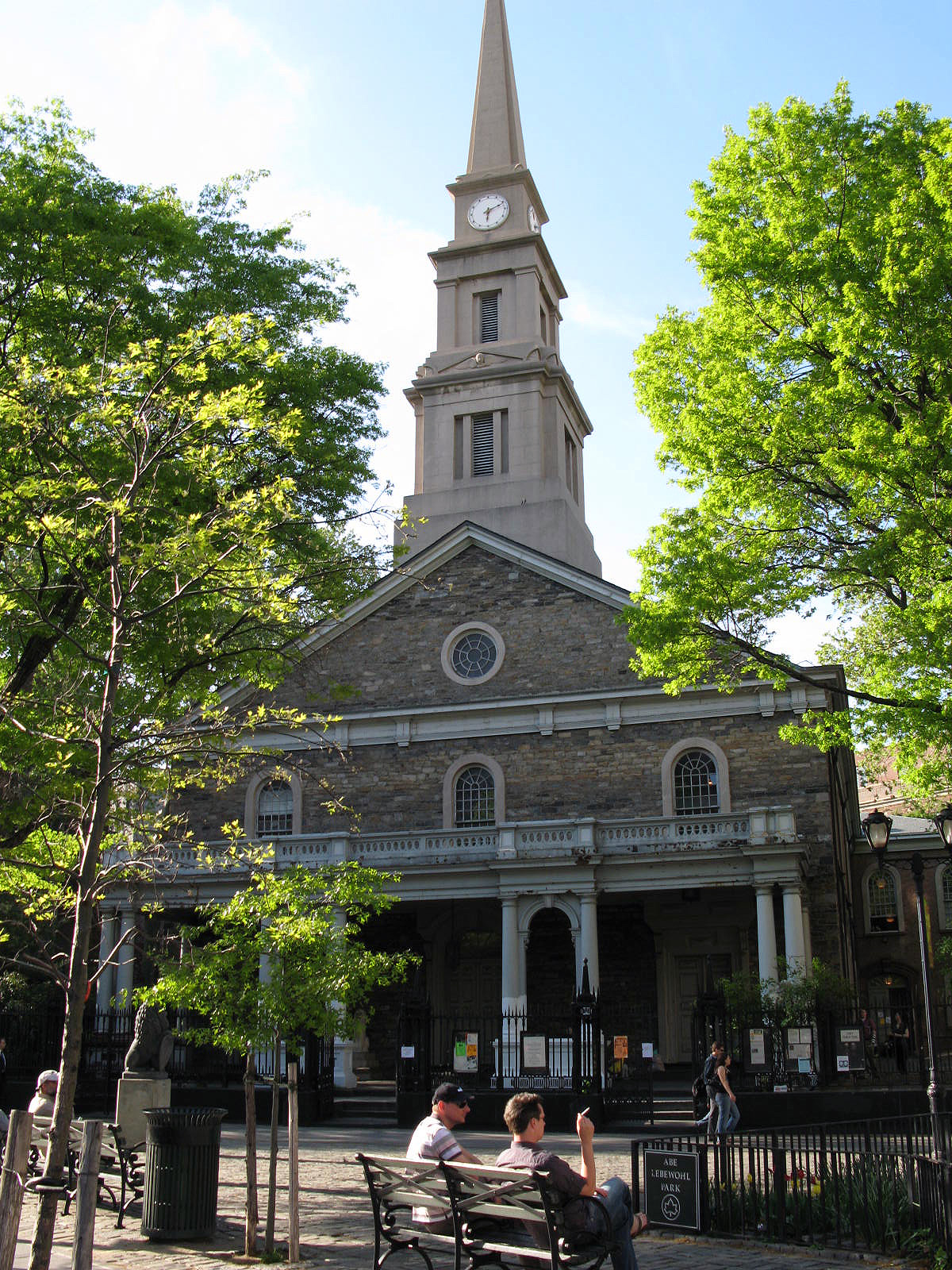
St. Mark's Church in-the-Bowery, site of Peter Stuyvesant's grave

Peter Stuyvesant arrived in New Amsterdam in 1647, the only governor of the colony to be called director-general.

Some years earlier, land ownership policy was liberalised, and trading was somewhat deregulated, and many New Netherlanders considered themselves entrepreneurs in a free market. The population had reached about 15,000, including 500 on Manhattan Island.

During the period of his governorship, the province experienced exponential growth. Demands were made upon Stuyvesant from all sides: the GWC, the States General, and the New Netherlanders. The English were nibbling at Dutch territory to the north and the Swedes to the south, while in the heart of the province, the Esopus were trying to contain further Dutch expansion. Discontent in New Amsterdam led locals to dispatch Adriaen van der Donck back to the United Provinces to seek redress. After nearly three years of legal and political wrangling, the Dutch Government came down against the GWC, granting the colony a measure of self-government and recalling Stuyvesant in April 1652. The orders were rescinded with the outbreak of the First Anglo-Dutch War a month later.

Military confrontations were occurring in the Caribbean and along the South Atlantic coast as part of the First Anglo-Dutch War. In 1654, the Netherlands lost New Holland in Brazil to Portugal, encouraging some of its residents to emigrate north and making the North American colonies more appealing to some investors. The Esopus Wars are so named for the branch of Lenape that lived around Wiltwijck, today's Kingston, which was the Dutch settlement on the west bank of Hudson River between Beverwyk and New Amsterdam. These conflicts were generally over the settlement of land by New Netherlanders for which contracts had not been clarified, and were seen by the natives as an unwanted incursion into their territory. Previously, the Esopus, a clan of the Munsee Lenape, had much less contact with the River Indians and the Mohawks.

According to historian Eleanor Bruchey:

Peter Stuyvesant was essentially a difficult man thrust into a difficult position. Quick tempered, self-confident, and authoritarian, he was determined [...] to rule firmly and to repair the fortunes of the company. The company, however, had run the colony solely for trade profits, with scant attention to encouraging immigration and developing local government. Stuyvesant's predecessors [...] had been dishonest or, at best, inept, so there was no tradition of respect and support for the governorship on which he could build. Furthermore, the colonists were vocal and quick to challenge authority [...] Throughout his administration, there were constant complaints to the company of his tyrannical acts and pressure for more local self-government [...] His religious intolerance also exacerbated relations with the colonists, most of whom did not share his narrow outlook.

== Society ==
Historical population
Year	Pop.	±%
1625	200	—
1628	270	+35.0%
1630	350	+29.6%
1635	8,000	+2185.7%
1640	2,030	−74.6%
1650	4,301	+111.9%
1660	5,476	+27.3%
1673	9,000	+64.4%
Source: 1625–1673

New Netherlanders were not necessarily Dutch, and New Netherland was never a homogeneous society. Governor Peter Minuit was a Walloon born in what is now Germany who also spoke English and worked for a Dutch company. The term New Netherland Dutch generally includes all the Europeans who came to live there, but may also refer to Africans, Indo-Caribbeans, South Americans, and even the Indians who were integral to the society. Dutch was the official language and likely the lingua franca of the province, although other languages were also spoken.

There were Algonquian languages. Walloons and Huguenots tended to speak French, and Scandinavians and Germans brought their own tongues. It is likely that the Africans in Manhattan spoke their mother tongues, but were taught Dutch from 1638 by Adam Roelantsz van Dokkum. The arrival of refugees from New Holland in Brazil may have brought speakers of Portuguese, Spanish, and Ladino, with Hebrew as a liturgical language. Commercial activity in the harbor could have been transacted simultaneously in any of a number of tongues.

The Dutch West India Company introduced slavery in 1625 with the importation of 11 black slaves who worked as farmers, fur traders, and builders. They had a few basic rights and families were usually kept intact. They were admitted to the Dutch Reformed Church and married by its ministers, and their children could be baptized. Slaves could testify in court, sign legal documents, and bring civil actions against whites. Some were permitted to work after hours, earning wages equal to those paid to white workers. When the colony fell, the company freed the slaves, establishing early on a nucleus of free blacks.

The Union of Utrecht is the founding document of the Dutch Republic, signed in 1579, and it stated: "that everyone shall remain free in religion and that no one may be persecuted or investigated because of religion". The Dutch West India Company, however, established the Reformed Church as the official religious institution of New Netherland. Its successor church is the Reformed Church in America. The colonists had to attract the Indians and other non-believers to God's word, "through attitude and by example", but not "to persecute someone by reason of his religion, and to leave everyone the freedom of his conscience". The laws and ordinances of the states of Holland were incorporated by reference in those first instructions to the Governors Island settlers in 1624. There were two test cases during Stuyvesant's governorship in which the rule prevailed: the official granting of full residency for both Ashkenazi and Sephardi Jews in New Amsterdam in 1655, and the Flushing Remonstrance involving Quakers in 1657.

== Expansion and incursion ==
=== South River and New Sweden ===
Map of New Netherland (purple) and New Sweden (blue)

Apart from the second Fort Nassau, and the small community that supported it, settlement along the Zuyd Rivier was limited. The settlement sponsored by the patroons of Zwaanendael, Samuel Blommaert and Samuel Godijn was destroyed by the local Indigenous population soon after its founding in 1631 during the absence of their agent, David Pietersen de Vries.

Peter Minuit, who had obtained a deed for Manhattan from the Lenape, and was soon after dismissed as director, knew that the Dutch would be unable to defend the southern flank of their North American territory and had not signed treaties with or purchased land there from the Lenape. After gaining support from the Queen of Sweden, Minuit chose the west bank of the Delaware River to establish a colony there in 1638, calling it New Sweden. As expected, the government in New Amsterdam took no action other than to protest. Small settlements centered on Fort Christina sprang up as the colony slowly grew, mostly populated by Swedes, Finns, and Dutch.

In 1651, the Dutch dismantled Fort Nassau and constructed Fort Casimir on the west bank in an attempt to disrupt trade and reassert control. Three years later, Fort Casimir was seized by the Swedes, who renamed it Fort Trinity. In 1655, Stuyvesant led a military expedition and regained control of the region, naming its main settlement "New Amstel" (Nieuw-Amstel). While Stuyvesant was conquering New Sweden, some villages and farms at the Manhattans (Pavonia and Staten Island) were attacked in an incident that is known as the Peach War. These raids are sometimes considered revenge for the murder of a Munsee woman attempting to pluck a peach, though it is possible that they were an attempt to disrupt the attack on New Sweden.

In 1663, a new experimental settlement on Delaware Bay was begun, just before the English takeover in 1664. Franciscus van den Enden had drawn up a charter for a utopian society that included equal education of all classes, joint ownership of property, and a democratically elected government. Pieter Corneliszoon Plockhoy attempted such a settlement near the site of Zwaanendael, but it was largely destroyed in 1664 by the English.

=== Fresh River and New England ===
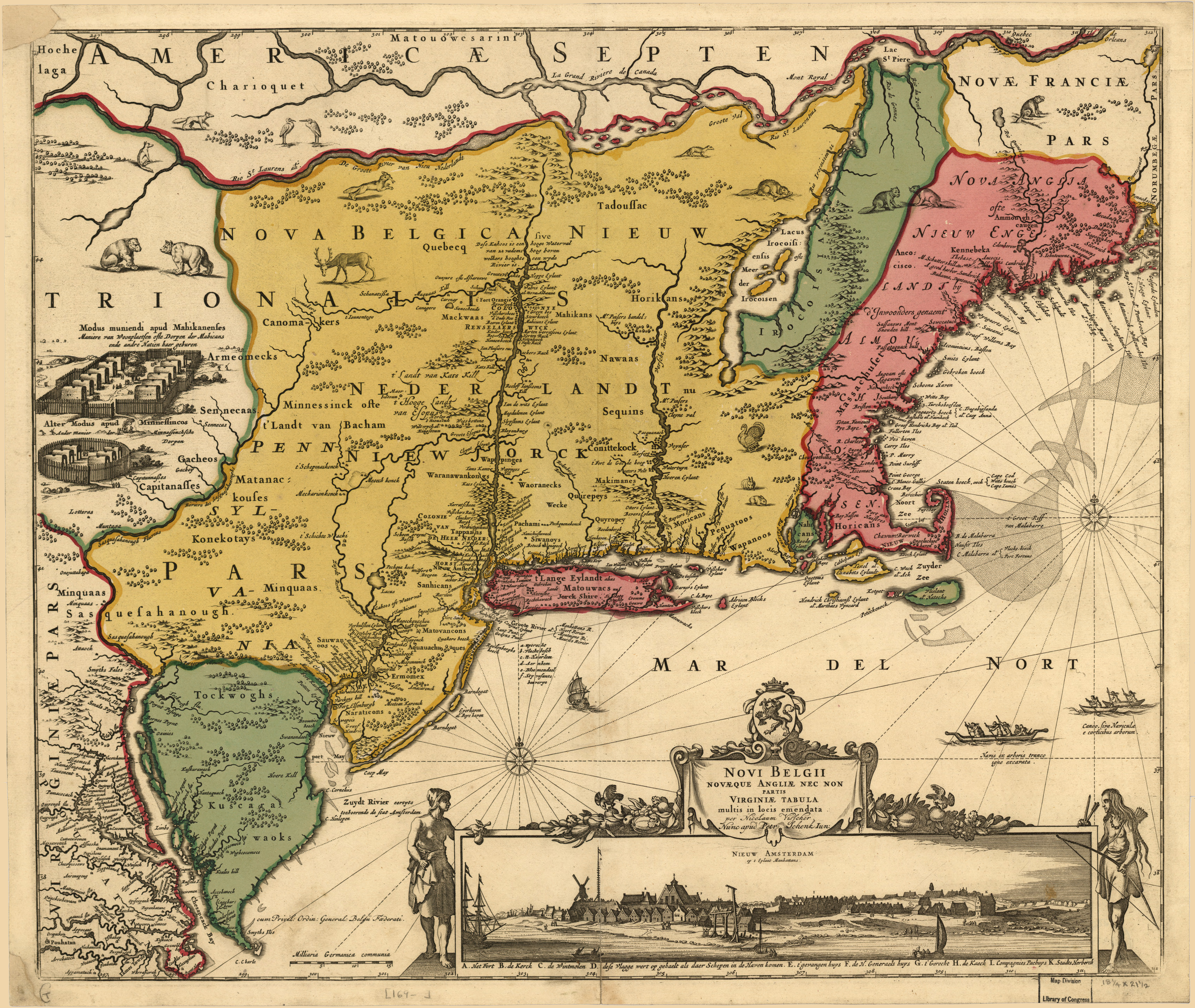
Nicolaes Visscher I's Novi Belgii Novæque Angliæ, a reprint of 1685, which is not a completely accurate map, since the border with New England was adjusted to 50 miles (80 km) west of the Fresh River, and the Lange Eylandt towns west of Oyster Bay, New York on present-day Long Island were under Dutch jurisdiction.

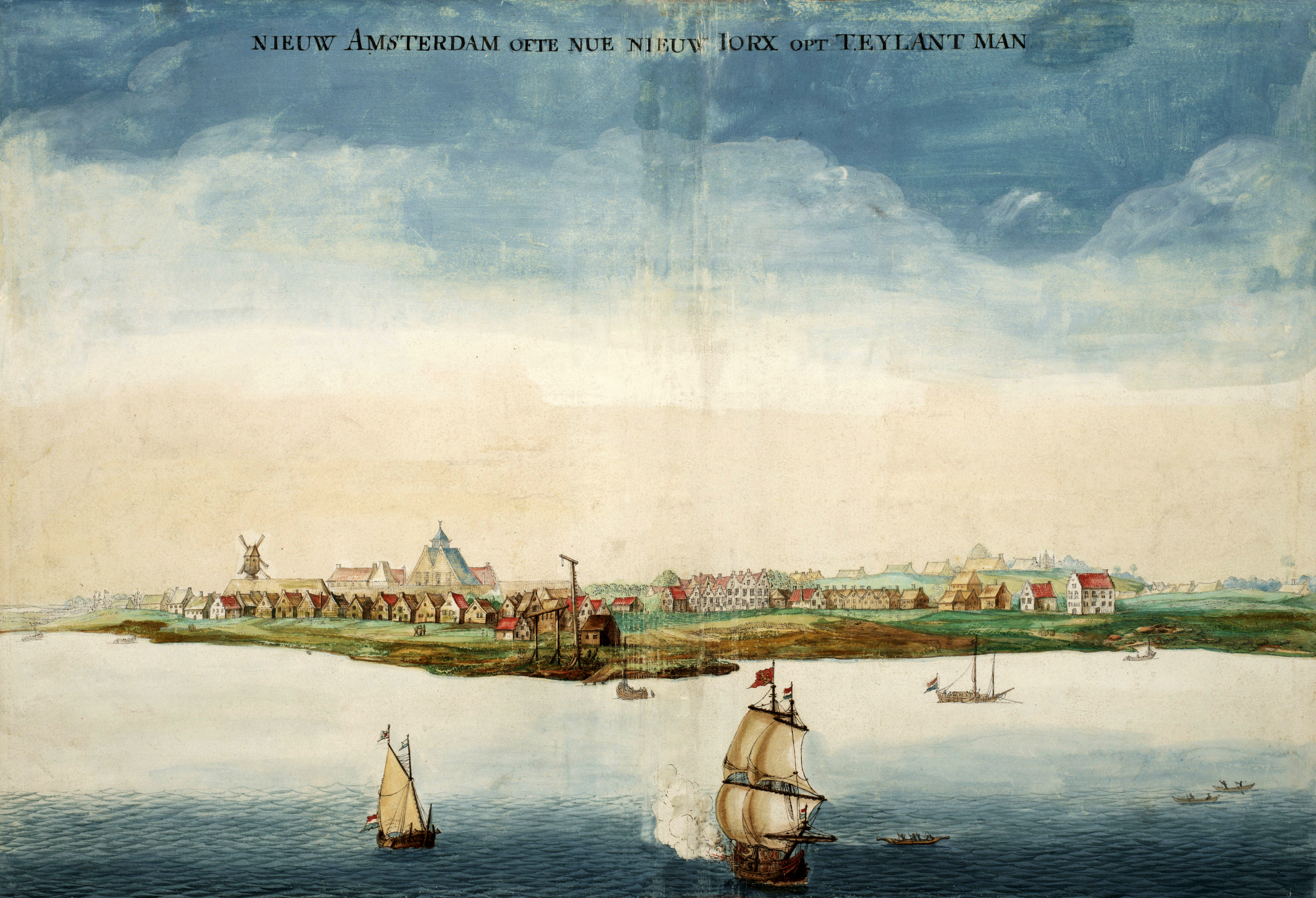
Image of Nieuw Amsterdam made in 1664, the year that it was surrendered to English forces under Richard Nicolls

A few Dutch settlers to New Netherland made their home at Fort Goede Hoop on the Fresh River. As early as 1637, English settlers from the Massachusetts Bay Colony began to settle along its banks and on Lange Eylandt, some with permission from the colonial government and others with complete disregard for it. The English colonies grew more rapidly than New Netherland as they were motivated by a desire to establish communities with religious roots, rather than for trade purposes. The wal or rampart at New Amsterdam (Wall Street) was originally built due to fear of an invasion by the English.

There initially was limited contact between New Englanders and New Netherlanders, but the two provinces engaged in direct diplomatic relations with a swelling English population and territorial disputes. The New England Confederation was formed in 1643 as a political and military alliance of the English colonies of Massachusetts, Plymouth, Connecticut, and New Haven. Connecticut and New Haven were on land claimed by the United Provinces. Still, the Dutch could not populate or militarily defend their territorial claim and, therefore, could do nothing but protest the growing flood of English settlers.

With the 1650 Treaty of Hartford, Stuyvesant provisionally ceded the Connecticut River region to New England, drawing New Netherland's eastern border 50 Dutch miles (approximately 250 km) west of Connecticut's mouth on the mainland and just west of Oyster Bay on Long Island. The Dutch West India Company refused to recognize the treaty but failed to reach any other agreement with the English, so the Hartford Treaty set the de facto border. Connecticut was mostly assimilated into New England.

== Capitulation, restitution, and concession ==
In March 1664, Charles II of England, Scotland, and Ireland resolved to annex New Netherland and "bring all his Kingdoms under one form of government, both in church and state, and to install the Anglican government as in old England". The Dutch West India Company directors concluded that the religious freedom they offered in New Netherland would dissuade English colonists from working toward their removal. They wrote to director-general Peter Stuyvesant:

[W]e are in hopes that as the English at the north (in New Netherland) have removed mostly from old England for the causes aforesaid, they will not give us henceforth so much trouble, but prefer to live free under us at peace with their consciences than to risk getting rid of our authority and then falling again under a government from which they had formerly fled.

On 27 August 1664, four English frigates led by Richard Nicolls sailed into New Amsterdam's harbor and demanded New Netherland's surrender. They met no resistance to the capture of New Amsterdam, since requests for troops to protect the Dutch colonists from their English neighbors and Native Americans had been ignored. This left New Amsterdam effectively defenseless, but Stuyvesant negotiated good terms from his "too powerful enemies".

Article VIII of these terms confirmed that New Netherlanders "shall keep and enjoy the liberty of their consciences in religion" under English rule. The Articles were largely observed in New Amsterdam and the Hudson River Valley, but were violated in another part of the conquest of New Netherland along the Delaware River, where Colonel Sir Robert Carr expropriated property for his own use and sold Dutch prisoners of war into slavery. Nicolls eventually forced Carr to return some of the confiscated property. In addition, a Mennonite settlement led by Pieter Corneliszoon Plockhoy near Lewes, Delaware, was destroyed.

The 1667 Treaty of Breda ended the Second Anglo-Dutch War. The Dutch did not press their claims on New Netherland, and the status quo was maintained, with the Dutch occupying Suriname and the nutmeg island of Run.

Within six years, the nations were again at war. In August 1673, the Dutch recaptured New Netherland with a fleet of 21 ships led by Vice Admiral Cornelis Evertsen the Youngest and Commodore Jacob Binckes, then the largest ever seen in America. They chose Anthony Colve as governor and renamed the city New Orange, reflecting the installation of William of Orange as Stadtholder of Holland in 1672. He became King William III of England in 1689.

The Dutch Republic needed money after the conclusion of the Third Anglo-Dutch War in 1672–1674, the historic "disaster years" in which the French simultaneously attacked the republic under Louis XIV, the English, the Prince-Bishop of Münster, and Archbishop-Elector of Cologne. The States of Zeeland had tried to convince the States of Holland to take on the responsibility for the New Netherland province, but to no avail. In February 1674, the Treaty of Westminster concluded the war. It took until 10 November 1674 for the new English governor Edmund Andros to take over from governor Anthony Colve.

== Legacy ==
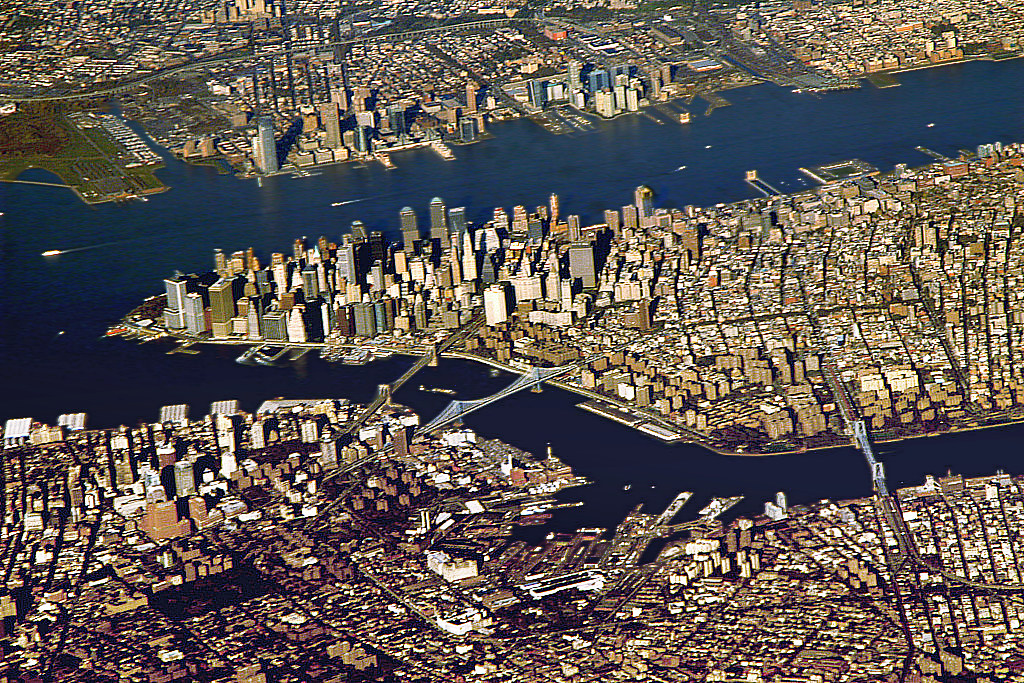
The original New Netherland settlements at Brooklyn, Manhattan, and Jersey City have grown into the New York metropolitan area, the largest metropolitan area in the United States

New Netherland grew into the largest metropolitan area in the United States, and some have argued that it left an enduring legacy on American cultural and political life. Nick Paumgarten writes that the Dutch colony was home to a "secular broadmindedness and mercantile pragmatism" that had consequences for the entire nation. Sam Roberts argues that the financial rather than religious motive behind Dutch migration led New York to develop differently to other American colonies.

=== Political culture ===
The concept of tolerance was the mainstay of the province's Dutch mother country. The Dutch Republic was a haven for many religious and intellectual refugees fleeing oppression, as well as home to the world's major ports in the newly developing global economy. Concepts of religious freedom and free trade (including a stock market) were Netherlands imports. In 1682, visiting Virginian William Byrd commented about New Amsterdam that "they have as many sects of religion there as at Amsterdam".

The Dutch Republic was one of the first nation-states of Europe where citizenship and civil liberties were extended to large segments of the population. The framers of the U.S. Constitution were influenced by the Constitution of the Republic of the United Provinces, though that influence was more as an example of things to avoid than of things to imitate.

The United States Declaration of Independence (1776) is strikingly similar to the Act of Abjuration (1581), which is essentially a declaration of independence of the United Provinces from the Spanish throne, though there is no concrete evidence that one influenced the other. John Adams went so far as to say that "the origins of the two Republics are so much alike that the history of one seems but a transcript from that of the other".

The Articles of Capitulation (outlining the terms of transfer to the English) in 1664 provided for the right to worship as one wished, and were incorporated into subsequent city, state, and national constitutions in the United States, and are the legal and cultural code that lies at the root of the New York Tri-State traditions.

The Flushing Remonstrance was a 1657 petition to director-general Peter Stuyvesant, in which some thirty residents of the small settlement at Flushing requested an exemption to his ban on Quaker worship. It is considered a precursor to the United States Constitution's provision on freedom of religion in the Bill of Rights.

Many prominent U.S. citizens are Dutch American directly descended from the Dutch families of New Netherland. The Roosevelt family produced two Presidents and are descended from Claes van Roosevelt, who emigrated around 1650. The Van Buren family of President Martin Van Buren, who even spoke Dutch as his first language, also originated in New Netherland. The Bush family descendants from Flora Sheldon are descendants from the Schuyler family.

=== Lore ===
Prinsenvlag, or "Prince's Flag", featuring the blue, white, and orange of some flags in the region

The blue, white, and orange on the flags of New York City, Albany and Jersey City are those of the Prinsenvlag ("Prince's Flag"), introduced in the 17th century as the Statenvlag ("States Flag"), the naval flag of the States General of the Netherlands. The flag and seal of Nassau County depicting the arms of the House of Nassau in the middle. The seven arrows in the lion's claw in the Dutch Republic's coat of arms were a precedent for the thirteen arrows in the eagle's claw in the Great Seal of the United States.

Washington Irving's satirical A History of New York and its famous fictional author Diedrich Knickerbocker had a large impact on the popular view of New Netherland's legacy. Irving's romantic vision of a Dutch yeomanry dominated the popular imagination about the colony since its publication in 1809. The tradition of Santa Claus is thought to have developed from a gift-giving celebration of the feast of Saint Nicholas on December 5 each year by the settlers of New Netherland. The Dutch Sinterklaas was changed to "Santa Claus", a name first used in the American press in 1773, when Nicholas was used as a symbol of New York's non-British past. However, many of the "traditions" of Santa Claus may have simply been invented by Irving in his 1809 parody.

=== Language and place names ===
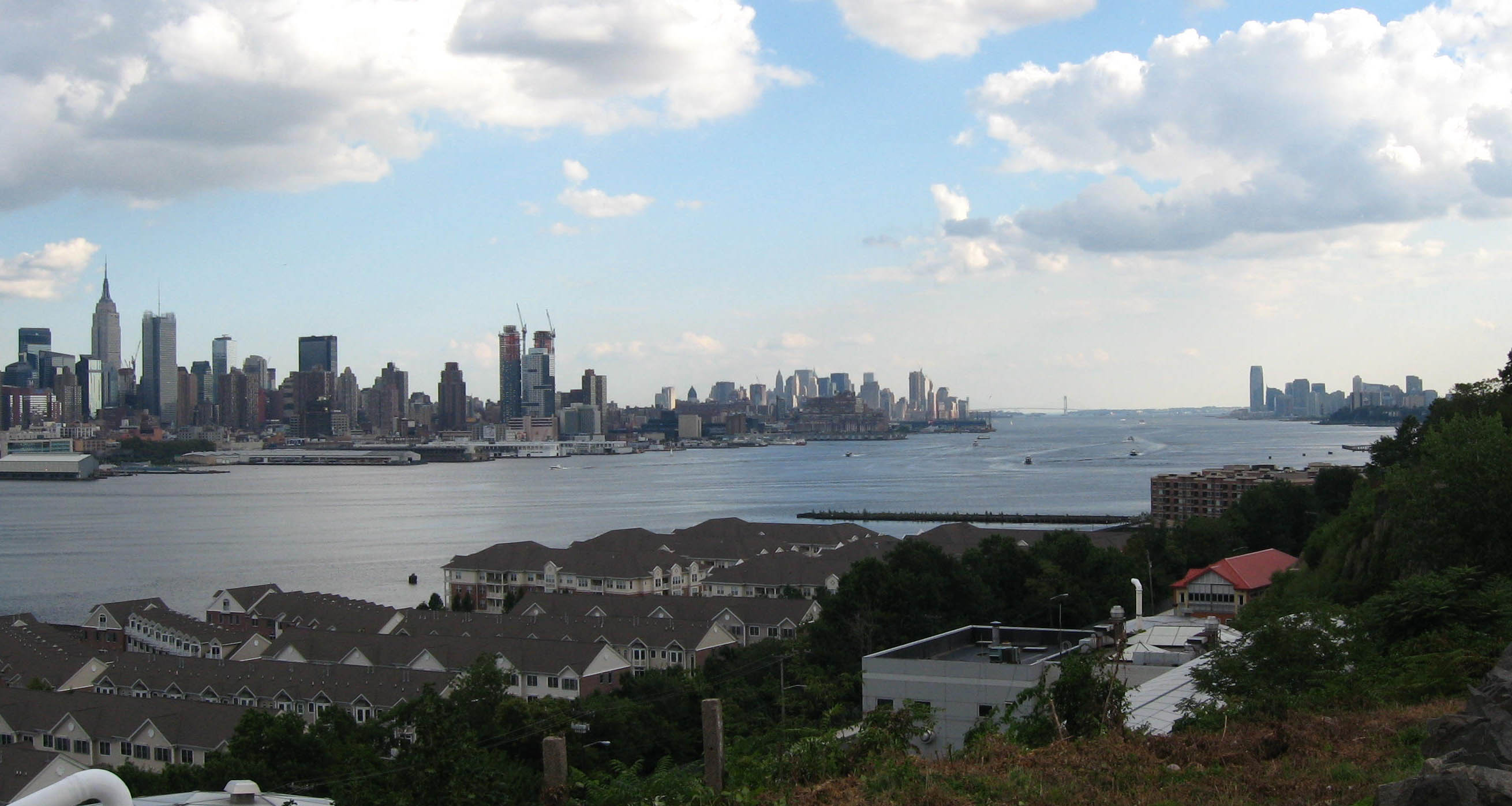
The Noort Rivier was one of the three main rivers in New Netherland.

Dutch continued to be spoken in the region for some time. President Martin Van Buren grew up in Kinderhook, New York speaking only Dutch, becoming the only president not to have spoken English as a first language. A dialect known as Jersey Dutch was spoken in and around rural Bergen and Passaic counties in New Jersey until the early 20th century. Mohawk Dutch was spoken around Albany.

Early settlers and their descendants gave many place names that are still in use throughout the region of New Netherland. They adapted Indian names for locations such as Manhattan, Hackensack, Sing-Sing, and Canarsie. Peekskill, Catskill, and Cresskill all refer to the streams, or kils, around which they grew. Among those that use hoek, meaning corner, are Constable Hook, Kinderhook, Paulus Hook, Red Hook, and Sandy Hook.

== See also ==
- Fortifications of New Netherland
- New Netherland settlements
- New Holland (Acadia)
- New Netherland Project to translate and publish 17th-century Dutch documents about the colony
- Congregation Shearith Israel, Jewish synagogue founded in the colony in 1655
- First Shearith Israel Graveyard, the only remaining 17th-century structure in Manhattan
- Spanish-Portuguese Jews in the United States
- Dutch American, an inhabitant of the United States of whole or partial Dutch ancestry
- Dutch Colonial Revival architecture
- Holland Society of New York
- List of English words of Dutch origin
- List of place names of Dutch origin
- Zwaanendael Colony
