= Fortuyn (1722) =

Dutch East India Company ship lost in 1724

Coordinates: 10°00′S 112°00′E

History
- Name: Fortuyn
- Owner: Dutch East India Company
- Launched: 1723
- Fate: Disappeared 1724

General characteristics
- Displacement: 800 tons
- Length: 145 ft (44 m)
- Complement: 225

Fortuyn (also spelled Fortuin) was a ship owned by the Chamber of Amsterdam of the Dutch East India Company (Dutch: Vereenigde Oostindische Compagnie, commonly abbreviated to VOC) that was lost on its maiden voyage in 1723. It set sail for Batavia from Texel in the Netherlands on 27 September 1723. The ship reached the Cape of Good Hope on 2 January 1724, and continued on its voyage on 18 January. Fortuyn was never seen again and its fate is a matter of speculation.

It was approximately 800 tons with a carrying capacity of 280 tons and 44 metres (145 ft) long. On its maiden voyage it was commanded by Pieter Westrik and had a crew of 225 men.

== Location ==
Although VOC ships were not supposed to run within sight of the South Land (Australia) at that time of the year, it may have inadvertently sailed too far east and been wrecked off the Western Australian coast. Wreckage sighted in the Houtman Abrolhos by survivors of Zeewijk in 1727, and by HMS Beagle in 1840, could have been from Fortuyn, or alternatively from Ridderschap van Holland, that disappeared in 1694, or less likely Aagtekerke that disappeared in 1726.

The Australian National Shipwreck Database records the ship as "possibly wrecked near Cocos Island".

== See also ==
- List of people who disappeared mysteriously at sea
