= Adriaen Block =

Dutch trader and ship captain (d. 1627)

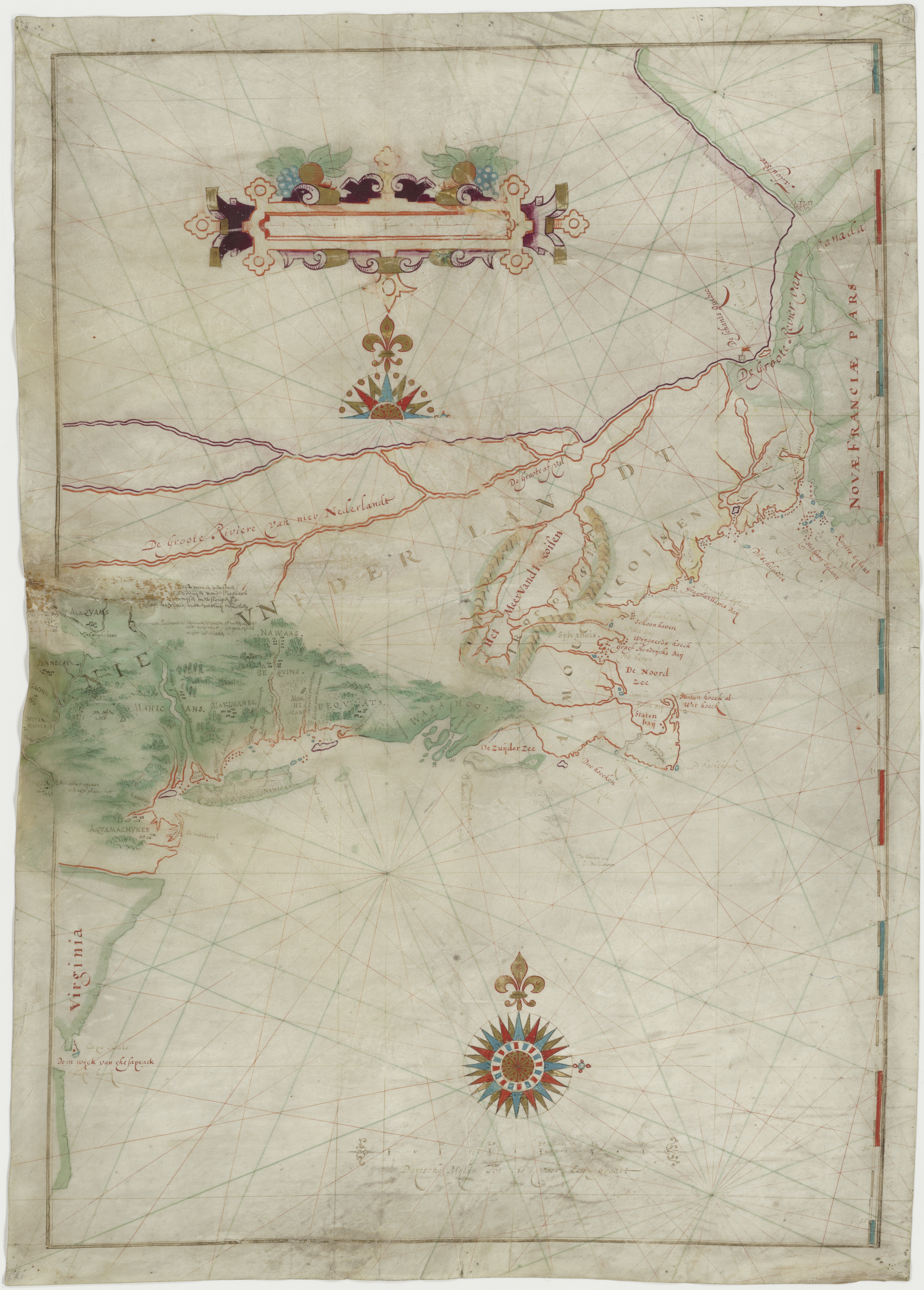
Block's map of his 1614 voyage, with the first appearance of the term "New Netherland"

Adriaen Courtsen Block (c. 1567 – 27 April 1627) was a Dutch private trader, privateer, and ship's captain who is best known for exploring the coastal and river valley areas between present-day New Jersey and Massachusetts during four voyages from 1611 to 1614, following the 1609 expedition by Henry Hudson. He is noted for possibly having named Block Island, Rhode Island, and establishing early trade with the Native Americans, and for the 1614 map of his last voyage on which many features of the mid-Atlantic region appear for the first time, and on which the term New Netherland is first applied to the region. He is credited with being the first European to enter Long Island Sound and the Connecticut River, and to determine that Manhattan and Long Island are islands.

== Early life ==
Though spending much of his time at sea, Block called Amsterdam his home. There, on 26 October 1603, he married Neeltje Hendricks van Gelder, with whom he would have five or possibly six children between 1607 and 1615. In 1606 they moved into a house called De Twee Bontecraijen ("The Two Hooded Crows") on Amsterdam's Oude Waal street, where his family would live for the remainder of Block's life.

In the 1590s, Block already was active in the shipping trade, transporting wood from Northern Europe to deforested Spain. He is for example mentioned delivering Norwegian timber in April 1596 in Bilbao. From there he headed for Ribadeo to buy goods for Cádiz. In April 1601, he was part of a convoy of ships leaving Amsterdam for the Dutch East Indies, at that time probably as far as the Moluccas, returning home in 1603.

In the spring of 1604, after delivering goods in Liguria, Block sailed on to Cyprus buying cargo (rice, cotton, nuts, etc.) he hoped to sell in Venice. This trade fell through, and he headed home to Amsterdam. Passing Lisbon, he came upon a Lübeck-based ship returning from a trip to Brazil. He had written permission from Dutch authorities to capture enemy ships, which he put to use as a privateer, taking the ship and its load to Amsterdam. Though the ship and some of its goods were returned to its owners, Block made a lot of money, with which he probably bought the house on the Oude Waal.

== Block's new world expeditions ==
=== Early voyages (1611–1612) ===
Following Hudson's contact with the Native Americans in the Hudson Valley in 1609, the Dutch merchants in Amsterdam had deemed the area worth exploring as a potential source of trade for beaver pelts, which were a lucrative market in Europe at the time.

Cornelis Rijser successfully returned in the St. Pieter in 1611, and Block and his fellow captain Hendrick Christiaensen returned the next year in 1612, bringing back furs and two sons of a native sachem in the Fortuyn and another ship outfitted by a group of Lutheran merchants. It took about ten weeks to sail to New Netherland, sometimes longer. The prospect of successful fur trade prompted the States General, the governing body of the Dutch Republic, to issue a statement on 27 March 1614, stipulating that the discoverers of new countries, harbors, and passages would be given an exclusive patent good for four voyages undertaken within three years to the territories discovered if the applicant should submit a detailed report within 14 days after his return.

=== The 1614 expedition ===
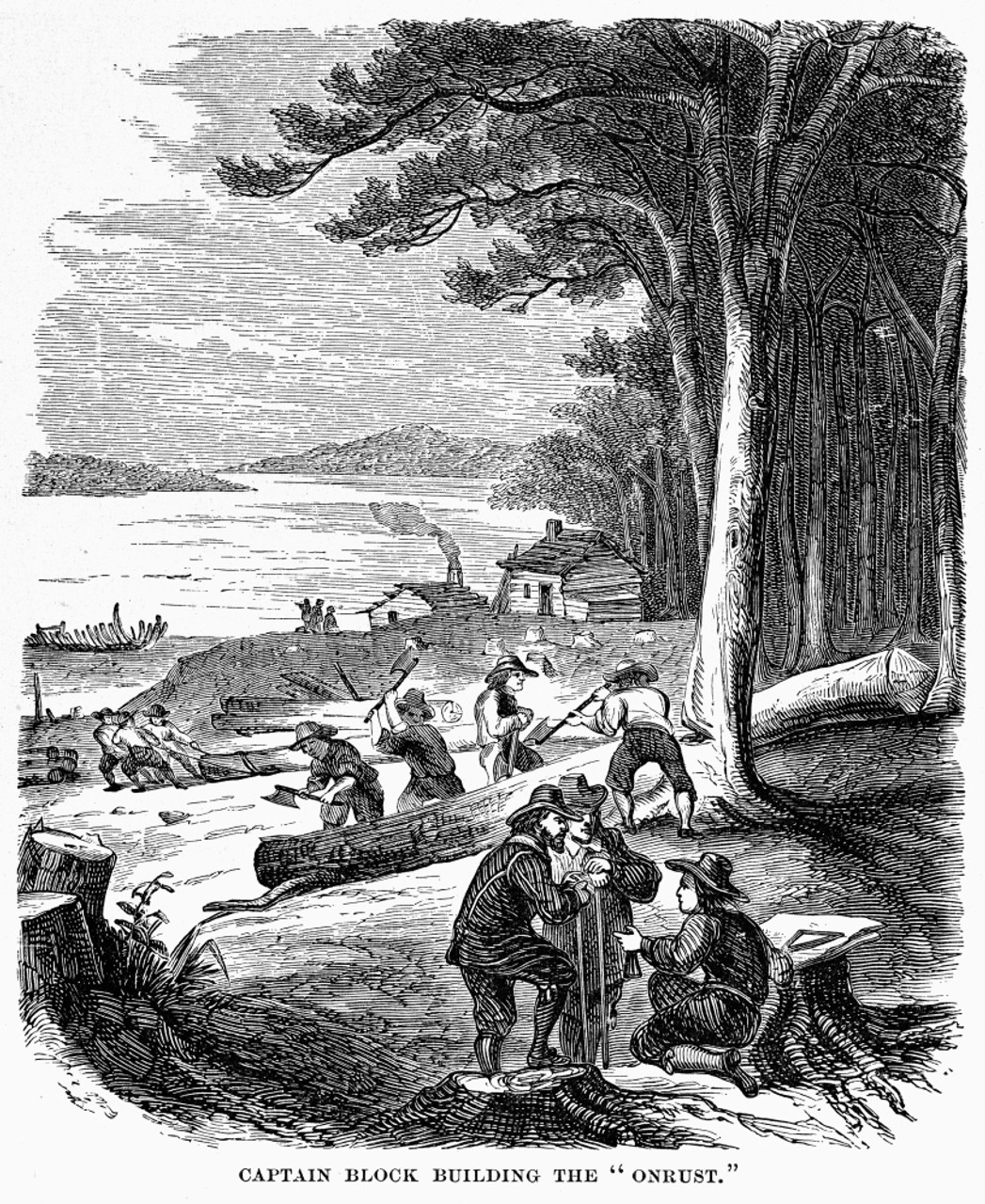
Captain Block and crew building the Onrust in 1614, as imagined in a 19th century engraving

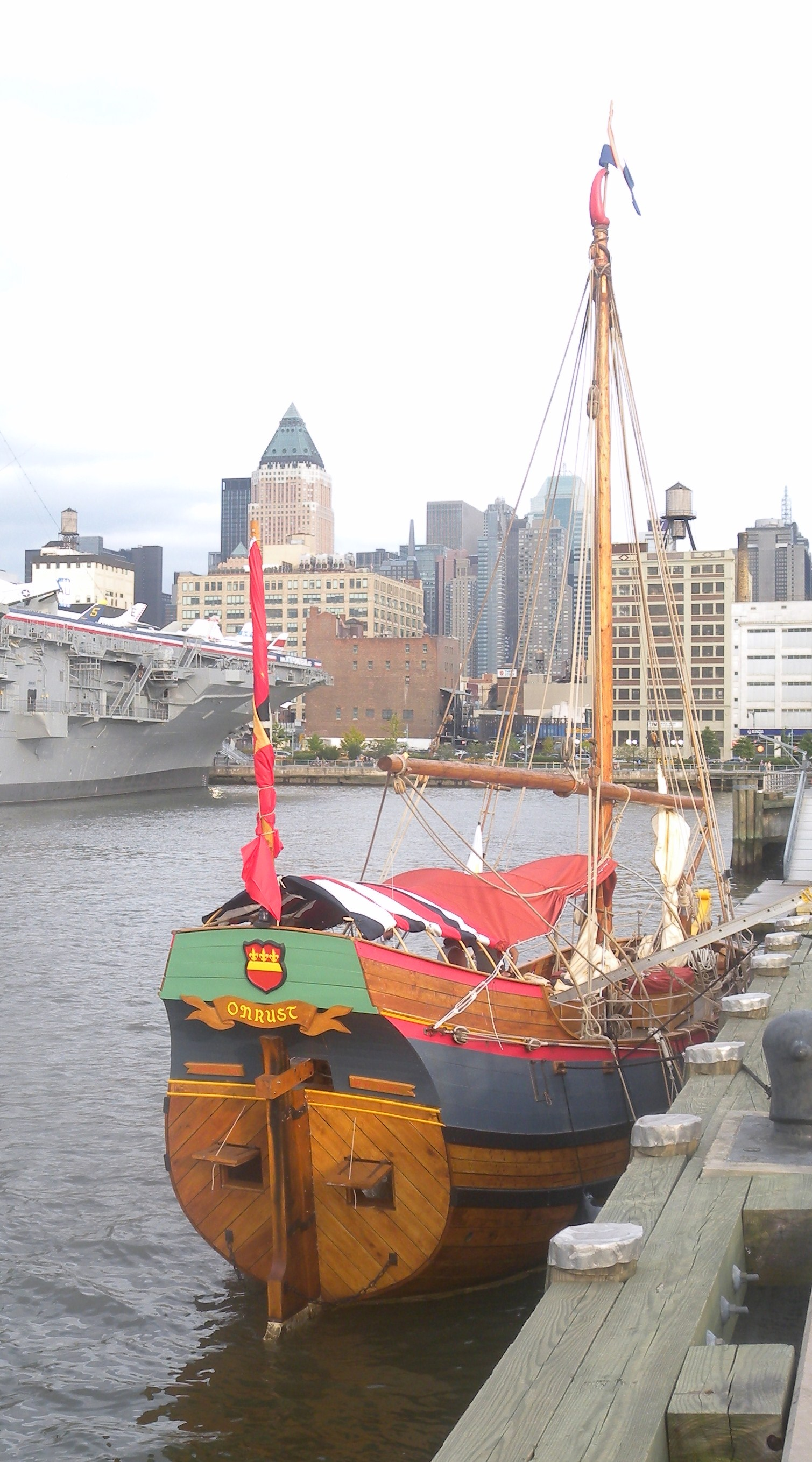
Replica of the Onrust docked in Manhattan.

In 1613, Block made a fourth voyage to the lower Hudson in the Tyger accompanied by several other ships especially equipped for trading. While moored along southern Manhattan, the Tyger was accidentally destroyed by fire. Over the winter, he and his men, with help from the Lenape (La-Na-Pae), built the 44.5-foot (13.6 m) ship 16-ton Onrust (Dutch for "Restless").

In this later ship, he explored the East River and was the first known European to navigate the Hellegat (now called Hell Gate) and to enter Long Island Sound. Traveling along the Sound, he entered the Housatonic River (which he named "River of Red Hills") and the Connecticut River, which he explored at least as far as the site of present-day Hartford, today's capital of the state of Connecticut, some sixty miles up the river. Leaving Long Island Sound, he charted Block Island, which is named for him and Narragansett Bay, where he possibly named "Roode Eylandt" after the red (Dutch rood) color of its soil. On Cape Cod, he rendezvoused with one of the other ships of the expedition and left the Onrust behind before returning to Europe.

=== Life in the colony ===
Block's exploration would lead to the eventual colonization of Connecticut. The life was hard, as it was settled in the winter as a result of the Connecticut River turning to ice. Block sailed upstream and established the Dutch base that later became Hartford.

He is credited with naming Fishers Island (Vischer's Island) after a shipmate. Though it lies physically closer to Connecticut than New York, the island is a part of Long Island's Suffolk County.

=== New Netherland company ===
Upon returning, Block compiled a map of his voyage together with known information of the time. The Block map was the first to apply the name "New Netherland" to the area between English Virginia and French Canada, as well as the first to show Long Island as an island.

On 11 October 1614 Block, together with Christiaensen and a group of twelve other merchants, presented to the States General a petition to receive exclusive trading privileges for the area. Their company, the newly formed New Netherland Company, was granted exclusive rights for three years to trade between the 40th parallel north and the 45th parallel north.

=== Final voyages and death ===
After his return to Amsterdam in July 1614, he would not return to the New World again. In 1615, Block was Commissary-General of three men-of-war and eleven whaleships sent to Spitsbergen by the Noordsche Compagnie.

He remained sailing until his death in 1627. He was buried that year on April 27 in Amsterdam's Oude Kerk in a grave next to his wife, who had predeceased him two years earlier.

== Legacy ==
A multimillion-dollar redevelopment on the Connecticut River in Hartford, Connecticut is named "Adriaen's Landing" after Block. Adriaen Block has a middle school in Flushing, Queens (NYC) named after him, as is Block Island, off the southern coast of Rhode Island.
