= List of New Netherland placename etymologies =

New Netherland (Dutch: Nieuw-Nederland) was the seventeenth-century colonial province of the Republic of the Seven United Netherlands on northeastern coast of North America. The claimed territory were the lands from the Delmarva Peninsula to southern Cape Cod. Settled areas are now part of the northeastern states of Delaware, New Jersey, New York, and southwestern Connecticut. There were small outposts in Pennsylvania and Rhode Island. Its capital, New Amsterdam, was located at the southern tip of the island of Manhattan on the Upper New York Bay. The most developed part of the province roughly corresponds to today's Tri-State area (New Jersey, New York, and Connecticut).

== Overview ==
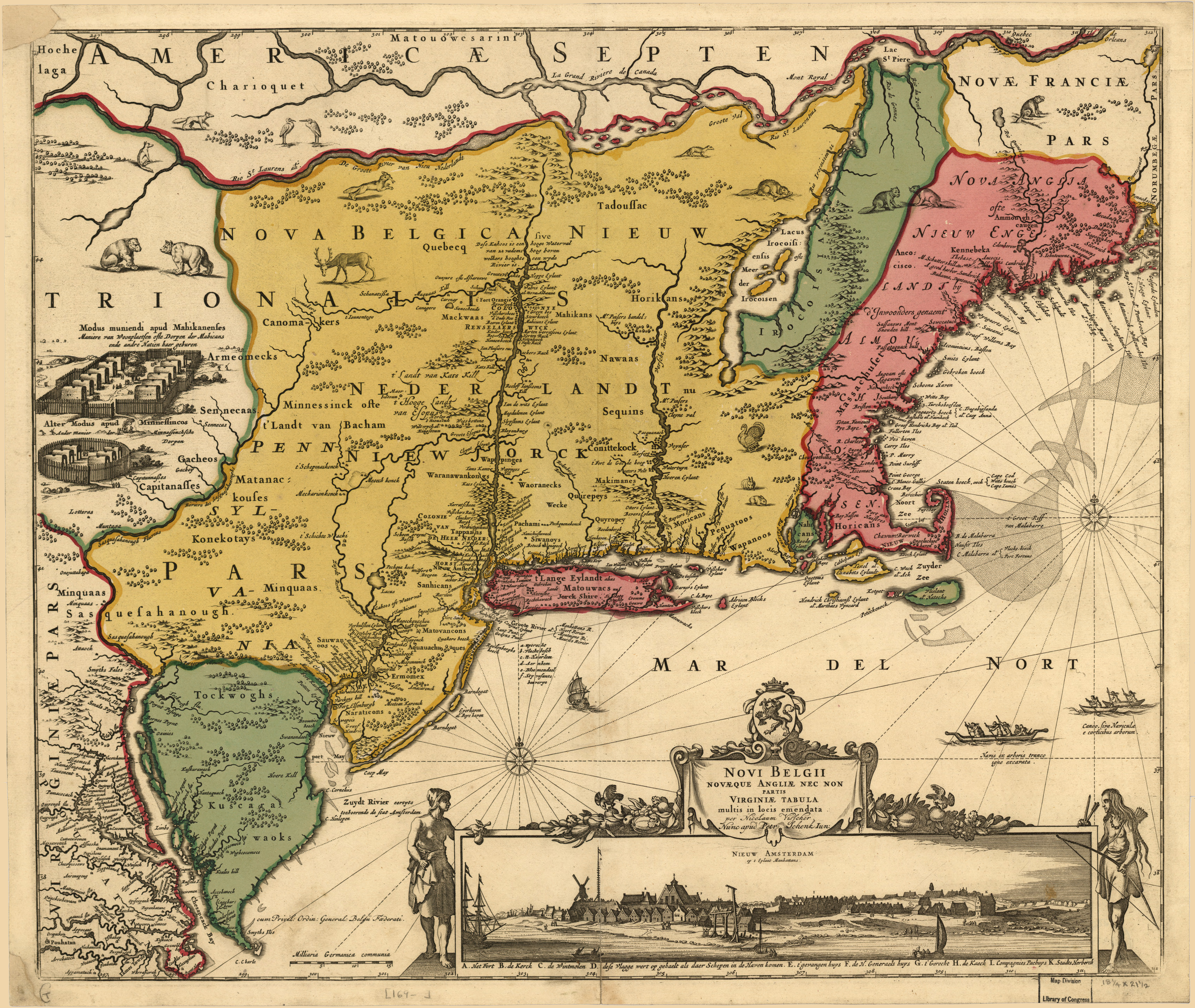
Map of New Netherland by Nicolaes Visscher (1685), including many place names in the Dutch colony

Placenames in most cases had their roots in Dutch and the Algonquian languages, and occasionally the Iroquoian Mohawk. At the time of European settlement it was the territory of the various Native American groups. In many cases the names of the Natives Americans used today were taken from the word for the place they made their villages, or their sagamore. Both the Americans and the New Netherlanders often gave names inspired by the geography or geology of the natural environment and described a shape, location, feature, quality, or phenomenon.

The Lenape population, who had the most frequent contact with the New Netherlanders, were seasonally migrational groups around the New York Bay and along the Lower Hudson who became known collectively as the River Indians. Among them were the Wecquaesgeek and Siwanoy (to the north on the east side of the Hudson River); the Hackensack, Raritan, the Ramapough, and Tappan (to the west); and the Canarsee and Rockaway (on western Long Island).

The Munsee inhabited the Highlands and western Hudson Valley. The Susquehannock, who lived along the Zuyd Rivier, were called the Minquas. The Mohawk, an Iroquois people, inhabited the Albany region, and the valley that now bears the name. The Mahicans, defeated by the Mohawks, retreated to the Housatonic River region soon after the arrival of the Dutch.

The Native Americans used wampum for transcription. The Swannekins, or Salt Water People (as the Europeans were called), used the Latin alphabet to write down the words they heard from the Wilden (Dutch for wild people), as the Lenape were called. These approximations were no doubt greatly influenced by Dutch, which was the lingua franca of the multilingual province. Some names still exist in their altered form, their current spelling (and presumably pronunciation) having evolved over the last four centuries into American vernacular.

Early settlers and their descendants often "Batavianized" names for geographical locations, the exonyms, rather than by their autonym, subsequently becoming the name of the Native Americans used today. In some cases it cannot be confirmed, or there is contention, as to whether the roots are in the Dutch or native tongue as sources do not always concur. Some can have several interpretations, while locative suffixes vary depending on the Algonquian language dialect that prevailed. Kill, meaning stream or channel, wyck meaning district, (or its English equivalents wick and wich), and hook meaning point are often seen.

Dutch surnames abound throughout the region as avenues, lakes, parks. Orange and Nassau come from the "first family" of the Dutch Republic, a dynasty of nobles traditionally elected "Stadtholder." William III of England was also prince of Orange, succeeding to the English throne through the conquest known as the Glorious Revolution, so the appellation Orange, though sometimes named for the English king in this period, reflects his Dutch birth and dynasty.

== A ==
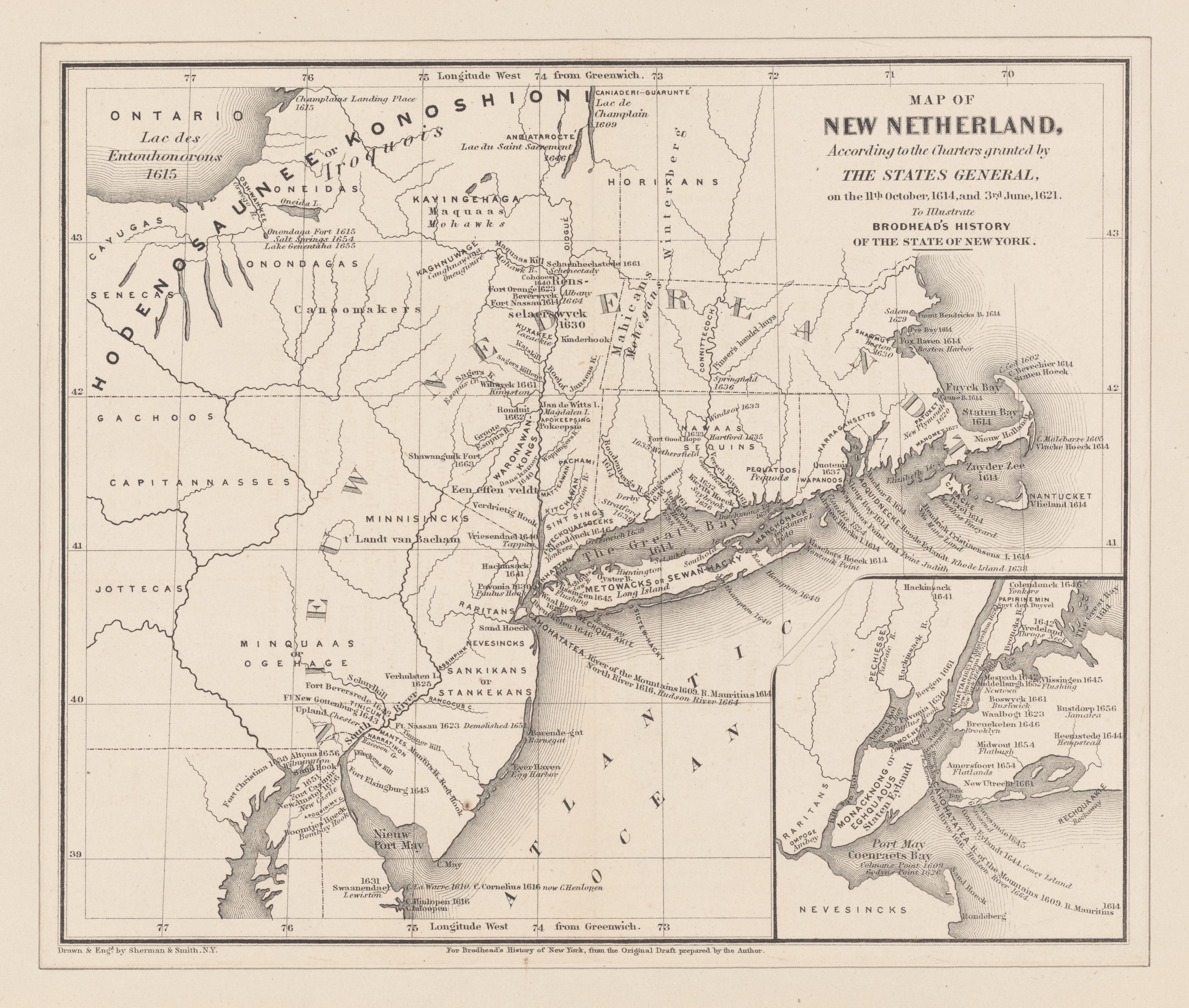
Map of New Netherland according to the Charters granted by The States General on 1614 and 1621

=== Acquackanonk ===
The name of a Unami group who lived along and between the banks of the Passaic Neck and the name of one of the state's first townships, established in 1683. Meaning "a place in a rapid stream where fishing is done with a net," alternatively, "at the lamprey stream" from the contemporary axkwaakahnung. Spellings include Achquakanonk, Acquackanonk, Auchaquackanock, and Ackquekenon.

=== Achter Col ===
Called Meghgectecock by the Lenape, this described the area around Newark Bay and the rivers that flowed into it. Neither are any longer in use. Achter, meaning "behind," and kol, meaning "neck," can be translated as the back (of the) peninsula, in this case Bergen Neck. Variations include Achter Kol, Achter Kull, Archer Col, Achter Kull. A col is a gap or pass between mountains, in this case Bergen Hill and the Watchung Mountains, the flood-plain of Hackensack River and Passaic River providing a passage between them, thus, rear pass or rear passage.

=== Amsterdam ===
After the Dutch capital, originally a dam on the Amstel River founded in 1275.

=== Arresick ===
A tidal island, site of the first ferry landing for the patroonship Pavonia, which became Paulus Hook. Spellings include Arresick, Arressechhonk, and Aresick, meaning "burial ground."

=== Arthur Kill ===
Tidal strait separating Staten Island from the mainland. From kille, meaning "water channel," such as a riverbed, rivulet, or stream. Likely to have evolved from Achter Col, the name given by the New Netherlanders for the area surrounding Newark Bay and the waters that flowed into it, as English-speakers immigrated to the region radiating from the Elizabethtown Tract and Perth Amboy.

== B ==
=== Barnegat ===
Originally Barendegat or "Inlet of the Breakers" for the waterway's turbulent channel.

=== Bedloe's Island ===
Now known as Liberty Island, under Dutch sovereignty the island became the property of Isaack Bedloo, merchant and "select burgher" of New Amsterdam, and one of 94 signers of the "Remonstrance of the People of New Netherlands to the Director-General and Council".

=== Bergen ===
==== Bergen Square ====
The forerunner of Hudson and Bergen counties. Believed to come from the word bergen, which in Dutch and other Germanic languages of northern Europe means "mountains" or "hills", and could describe a most distinct geological feature of the region, the Palisades. Another interpretation is that it comes from the Dutch verb bergen as meaning "to save or recover" or the noun "place of safety", inspired by the settlers' return after they had fled attacks by the native population during the Peach War. Some say that it is named for Bergen op Zoom in the Netherlands or the city in Norway.

==== Bergen Street ====
In the contemporary borough of Brooklyn, Bergen Street was named for the family of one of the earliest settlers of Nieuw Amsterdam, Hans Hansen Bergen, who arrived in the province of New Netherland in 1633 as a ship's carpenter. He came from Bergen, Norway, and was one of the few Scandinavian settlers of Nieuw Amsterdam (New York City). Bergen initially settled on Pearl Street in Lower Manhattan and later owned extensive plantations elsewhere on the island. Bergen later married Sarah Rapelje, the first child born in New York state of European parents.

=== Beversreede ===
The fort on the Schuylkill River. A possible translation could be "Beavers Gap," from bever ("beaver") and reet (opening / cleft), which would speak to its location where it enters the Delaware. More probably reede meant a "quai" in the harbor (cf. today's Dutch rede). Alternatively, adjacent to (or opposite) the fort was the terminus of the Great Minquas Path, an 80-mile (130 km) trail from the Susquehanna River to the Schuylkill River. This was the primary trade route for furs from the Susquehannock people, and the Dutch named the trail Beversreede, "Beaver Road." However, 'rede' is Dutch for roadstead (anchorage) so the explanation 'quai' makes the most sense.

=== Beverwyck ===
Loosely, "Beavertown," to refer a fur-trading community north of Fort Orange. It is unlikely to be named after Beverwijk in the Netherlands, whose name comes from Bedevaartswijk, "pilgrimage neighbourhood." (Agatha of Sicily allegedly appeared there in the 9th century to a virgin from nearby Velsen.)

=== Blauvelt ===
From a Dutch family name. The first Blauvelt in America was a peasant farmer who worked on Kiliaen van Rensselaer's estate cultivating tobacco in 1638. The same Dutch family name lies at the origin of Bluefields Bay in Jamaica and Bluefields in Nicaragua – after Abraham Blauvelt, Dutch trader, explorer, pirate and privateer. He operated from New Amsterdam from 1644.

=== Block Island ===
Named after the explorer Adriaen Block who used the island as a base from which to survey the Connecticut River and Long Island Sound.

=== Bloomingdale ===
The "valley of flowers," it is likely named for a village in the Netherlands, the Upper West Side in general (its northern reaches now as known as the Bloomingdale District) may have had some characteristics that would have reminded the Netherlanders of their home: close to the shore with a sandy bluff, with many small valleys or (dells). In analogy to the Dutch village of Bloemendaal lying next to the town of Haarlem, so the Dutch settlers seemed to have named the small settlement next to the village of Harlem on Manhattan.

=== Bowery ===
Bouwerij was the old Dutch word for farm (contemporary: boerderij). The Dutch West India Company mapped out land for farms on Manhattan north of New Amsterdam, the first of which, "Bouerij 1" (later known as Stuyvesant Farm) was reserved for the support of the colony's director-general. It became the personal property of Petrus Stuyvesant, the person to hold the position.

=== Broadway ===
Breede weg was used throughout English-speaking areas to refer to a wide (broad) path (way).

=== Breuckelen ===
The first of the six Dutch towns of Brooklyn settled in 1646, generally believed to be after the town in the Netherlands, in the province of Utrecht, now spelled Breukelen.

=== The Bronx ===
Named after Jonas Bronck, the first recorded European settler to the peninsula. It was called Rananchqua by the native Siwanoy band of Lenape, while other Native Americans knew the Bronx as Keskeskeck. It was divided by the Aquahung River. The Bronck family later moved upstate and built Bronck House.

=== Brooklyn ===
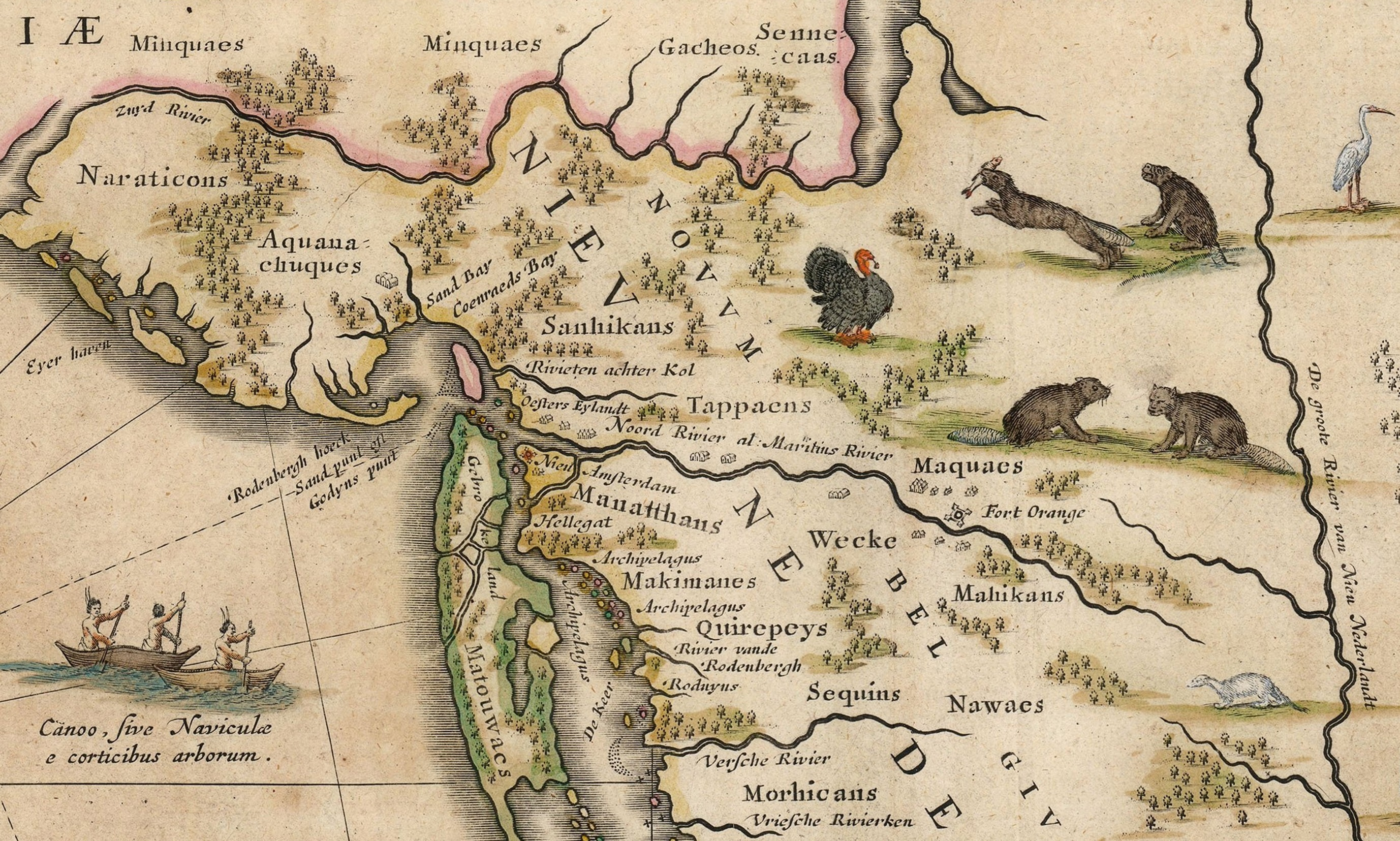
Map c.1634. An early name for Brooklyn was Gebroke Land, or broken land, likely because of its many streams, rivers, and tidal flats.

Early maps refer to western Long Island as Gebroken Land, or "Broken Land," though most believe the city, and later borough, was named for the Dutch town whose contemporary spelling is Breukelen. Some say the name evolved from Breuckelen, to Brockland, to Brocklin, to Brookline, and eventually, Brooklyn.

=== Bushwick ===
The last of the six Dutch towns of Brooklyn settled in 1661 as Boswijck, in essence "little town in the woods," though a literal translation would be "woods district."

== C ==
=== Canarsie ===
Canarsie stems from the Lenape language for "fenced land" or "fort." The current neighborhood in Brooklyn lies within the former town of Flatlands, one of the five original Dutch towns on Long Island.

=== Casimir ===
The trading post Fort Casimir was named for Ernst Casimir of Nassau-Dietz, count of Nassau-Dietz and Stadtholder of Friesland, Groningen and Drenthe in the Netherlands.

=== Cape Henlopen ===
After Thijmen Jacobsz Hinlopen, wealthy grain trader and business partner of Cornelius Jacobsz May who helped finance explorations of the region.

=== Cape May ===
After Cornelius Jacobsz May.

=== Catskill ===
Kil is the Dutch word for a river inlet. This one is named after the Sachem named Cats.

=== Caven Point ===
The Caven Point settlement at Minkakwa on the west shore of the Upper New York Bay between Pamrapo and Communipaw was part of Pavonia, and now part of Liberty State Park. The name Caven is an anglicisation of the Dutch word Kewan. which in turn was a "Batavianized" derivative of an Algonquian word meaning peninsula.

=== Claverack ===
Rack or rak is a straight stretch of river good for anchorage, one named for theclover that grew on its banks of the Hudson River

=== Cohoes ===
Once part of the Manor of Rensselaerswyck. Believed to arise from a Mohawk expression Ga-ha-oose which refers to Cohoes Falls and means Place of the Falling Canoe

=== Colonie ===
Once part of the Manor of Rensselaerswyck, now north of Albany

=== Collect Pond ===
Fresh Water Pond near the southern tip of Manhattan, covering approximately 48 acres (194,000 m^{2}) and running as deep as 60 ft (18 m). The pond was fed by an underground spring, and its outflow ran through the Lispenard Meadows marshes to the Hudson River. The name Collect is a corruption of the Dutch word kolch (a small body of water), which was subsequently corrupted to kalch, and so on until it became Collect.

=== Communipaw ===
Site of summer encampment and counsel fire of the Hackensack Indians. Spellings include Gamoenapa, Gemonepan, Gemoenepaen, Gamenepaw, Comounepaw, Comounepan, Communipau, Goneuipan From gamunk, on the other side of the river, and pe-auke, water-land, meaning big landing-place from the other side of the river. Contemporary: gamuck meaning other side of the water or otherside of the river or landing place at the side of a river Site of first "bouwerie" built at Pavonia and called Jan de Lacher's Hoeck some have suggested that it comes from Community of Pauw, which likely is more a coincidence that a fact.

=== Colen Donck ===
Now Yonkers, from homestead of Jonkheer or Jonker (meaning esquire) Adriaen van der Donck.

=== Coney Island ===
Konynen Eylant meaning Rabbit Island.

=== Connecticut ===
Mohegan quinnitukqut, meaning "place of long tidal river".

=== Constable Hook ===
A land grant to Jacob Jacobsen Roy who was a chief gunner or constable in Fort Amsterdam in New Amsterdam in 1646, by the Dutch West India Company, under the leadership of Director of New Netherland William Kieft. Konstapel's Hoeck in Dutch, takes its name from Roy's title. A hoek or hoeck in Dutch meaning a spit of land or small peninsula. Though not used, could be translated to English as Gunner's Point.

=== Cortelyou ===
Cortelyou Road in Brooklyn is named for Jacques Cortelyou, New Netherland's Surveyor General, who owned land in the area of Flatbush.

=== Cortlandt ===
From the prominent family Van Cortlandt, including Stephanus van Cortlandt (born 1643) the first native born mayor of New York (1677–1678; 1686–1688)

=== Cromakill ===
Likely from kromme kille meaning crooked creek, border between Secaucus and North Bergen. Similar to evolution of Gramercy, which is a corruption of the krom mesje, or little crooked knife, the name of a small brook that flowed along what is now 21st Street in Manhattan.

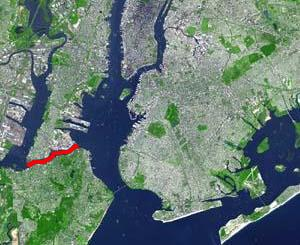
Kill Van Kull connects Newark Bay with Upper New York Bay.

=== Cresskill ===
From the watercress that grew in its streams, or kills.

== D ==
=== Danskammer ===
Literally translating to dance chamber, meaning ballroom. On their voyage upriver in 1609 Henry Hudson's crew supposedly saw Native Americans dancing around a fire at the site and thought they were looking at "the Devil's dance chamber". There was once a lighthouse, Danskammer Point Light, at the site.

=== Delaware ===
From Thomas West, 3rd (or 12th) Baron of De La Warr, or Lord Delaware, who served as governor of the Jamestown Colony

=== Dunderberg ===
Thunder Mountain

=== Dunkerhook ===
Literally dark corner. Small section of suburban Paramus reputed to be the former site of a "slave community." According to local histories and an historic marker at the site, Dunkerhook was once home to a population of African Americans, many or all of whom were slaves, as well as a "slave school" and "slave church." However, primary historic documentation establishes that Dunkerhook was populated not by slaves, but rather primarily by free African Americans.

=== Dwars Kill ===
Alternatively Dwarskill or Dwarskill Creek, a tributary of the Oradell Reservoir meaning cross creek

== E ==
=== Esopus ===
For the clan of Munsee who lived in the region in the mid Hudson Valley.

== F ==
=== Flatlands ===
One of the six Dutch towns of Brooklyn settled in 1647 as Nieuw Amersfoort, from the Dutch city of the same name.

=== Flatbush ===
A description of the terrain, in Dutch Vlacke Bos. One of the six Dutch towns in Brooklyn, established in 1652 as Midwout, the earlier name living on as Midwood.

=== Flushing ===
From the Dutch town of Vlissingen. The derivation of the name Vlissingen is unclear, though most scholars relate the name to the word fles (bottle) in one way or another.

== G ==
=== Ghent ===
From the Flemish city Ghent, in Flanders, which historians believe is derived from the Celtic word 'ganda' which means confluence.

=== Gramercy ===
A corruption of the little river named Krom Moerasje meaning (small) crooked marsh

=== Goede Hoop ===
Good Hope, from Fort Huys de Goede Hoop, a fortress on the Fresh River and Park River, the 1633 founding of Hartford

=== Gowanus ===
Gowanes Creek after Gouwane, a sachem of the Canarsee

=== Gravesend ===
Settled in 1645 under Dutch patent by English followers of Anabaptist Lady Deborah Moody. Some speculate that it was named after the English seaport of Gravesend, Kent. An alternative explanation suggests that it was named by Director of New Netherland Willem Kieft for the Dutch settlement of Gravesande, which means Count's Beach or Count's Sand. 's-Gravenzande is a city in the Netherlands.

=== Guilderland ===
Popular lore has it that it comes from Moneyland, explained as referring to early Dutch settler's assumption that the large amount of sand in the area could generate a profitable glass industry. More likely is that it derives from the name of the province of Gelderland in the Netherlands, from whence came many Dutch settlers. It may have been originally Gelterland or Gelterlan. Until the introduction of the euro, modern Dutch currency was the guilder.

== H ==
=== Hackensack ===
The meadowlands, river and city, the Lenape Hackensack tribe and their territory, take their name from site of semi-permanent encampment on the neck between the river and Overpeck Creek, near the Teaneck Ridge. Variously translated as place of stony ground or place of sharp ground. Spellings include Ahkingeesahkuy, Achsinnigeu-haki, Achinigeu-hach, Ack-kinkas-hacky, Achkinhenhcky, Ackingsah-sack, Ackinckeshacky, Hackinsack Alternatively, suggested as the place where two rivers come together on low ground or stream which discharges itself into another on the level ground, which would speak to the confluence of the Hackensack and Overpeck Creek or Passaic River.

=== Halfmoon ===
Named in the 19th century for the crescent shape of the land between the Hudson River and Mohawk River, and is coincidentally the same as Halve Maen, the ship captained by Henry Hudson during his 1609 exploration of the river named for him.

=== Harlem ===
Originally Nieuw Haarlem after a major Dutch city called Haarlem.

=== Harsimus ===
Possibly Crow's Marsh. Site of a seasonal Hackensack encampment and one of first "bouweries" built by Dutch settlers at Pavonia. Spellings include: Aharsimus, Ahasimus, Hasymes, Haassemus, Hahassemes, Hasimus, Horseemes, Hasseme, Horsimus Contemporary: ahas meaning crow

=== Haverstraw ===
One of the first locales to appear on maps of North America, listed as Haverstroo, which means oat straw. It was common for the Lenape to use straw thatch for roofs on their dwellings, or wigwams.

=== Hell Gate ===
Hellegat meaning Hell's Passage because of its violent currents.

=== Hemsteede ===
Homestead or farmyard. The town was first settled around 1644 following the establishment of a treaty between English colonists, John Carman and Robert Fordham, and the Indians in 1643. Although the settlers were from the English colony of Connecticut, a patent was issued by New Amsterdam after the settlers had purchased land from the local natives. The town may have been named for either Hemel Hempstead in the United Kingdom or the Dutch city of Heemstede, a town south of Haarlem, Netherlands. Site of early English incurisons in New Netherland by New Englanders, in 1643

=== Hoboken ===
"Batavianization" of the Lenape tobacco pipe, from hoopookum or hupoken. Most likely to refer to the soapstone collected there to carve tobacco pipes, in a phrase that became Hopoghan Hackingh or place of stone for the tobacco pipe. (Contemporary: Hopoakan meaning pipe for smoking) Alternatively from Hoebuck, old Dutch for high bluff and likely referring to Castle Point Variations used during the colonial era included Hobock, Hobocan,Hoboocken, and Hobuck, Although the spellingHoboken was used by the English as early as 1668, it doesn't appear that until Col. John Steven purchased the land on which the city is situated that it became common. Some would believe the city to be named after European town of the same name. The Flemish Hoboken, annexed in 1983 to Antwerp, Belgium, is derived from Middle Dutch Hooghe Buechen or Hoge Beuken, meaning High Beeches or Tall Beeches. Established in 1135, the New Netherlanders were likely aware of its existence (and may have pronounced the Lenape to conform a more familiar sound), but it is doubtful that the city on the Hudson is named for it.

=== Housatonic ===
From the Mohican phrase usi-a-di-en-uk translated as beyond the mountain place.

=== Hudson ===
The river, county, city and numerous other places that bear this name most likely do so for the English sea captain Henry Hudson who explored the region in 1609 starting from Amsterdam on the Dutch ship Halve Maen ("Half Moon"), establishing a claim for the Dutch East Indies Company and Dutch Republic.

== J ==
=== Jamaica ===
Settled as Rustdorp with a 1656 land patent. English renamed it Jameco for Yamecah, a Native American. Alternatively, from "Jameco" after a Lenape language word for "beaver".

== K ==
=== Kill van Kull ===
Separating Bayonne and Staten Island. From the Middle Dutch word kille, meaning riverbed or water channel. Likely evolved from Achter Col, as in kille van kol, or channel from the neck, its spellings including Kill von Cull, Kille van Cole, Kill van Koll

=== Kinderhook ===
Kinderhoek meaning children's corner

=== Kinderkamack ===
Describes the area along middle reaches of Hackensack River, kamak said to come from the Lenape and mean place of ceremonial dance and worship possible spellings include Kinkachgemeck,

=== Kykuit ===
/ˈkaɪkʌt/, "lookout" in Dutch (though currently spelled "kijkuit"). It is situated in Pocantico Hills, on the highest point of the local surrounds near Tarrytown and Sleepy Hollow.

== L ==
=== Lange Eylandt ===
Translates to and the former name of Long Island

== M ==
=== Mahwah ===
Mawewi meaning meeting place or place where paths meet or assembly. Contemporary: mawemin

=== Manalapan ===
Manalapan meaning "land of good bread" or "good land to settle upon".

=== Manhattan ===
From Manna-hata, as written in the 1609 logbook of Robert Juet, an officer on Henry Hudson's yacht Halve Maen (Half Moon). A 1610 map depicts the name Manahata twice, on both the west and east sides of the Mauritius River (later named the Hudson River). The word "Manhattan" has been translated as island of many hills. The Encyclopedia of New York City offers other derivations, including from the Munsee dialect of Lenape: manahachtanienk ("place of general inebriation"), manahatouh ("place where timber is procured for bows and arrows"), or menatay ("island").

=== Maspeth ===
From Mespeatches translated as at the bad waterplace relating to the many stagnant swamps that existed in the area. Purchased in 1635, and within a few years began chartering towns. In 1642 they settled Maspat, under a charter granted to Rev. Francis Doughty. Maspat became the first European settlement in Queens. The settlement was leveled the following year in an attack by Native Indians, and the surviving settlers returned to Manhattan. It wasn't until nine years later, in 1652, that settlers ventured back to the area, settling an area slightly inland from the previous Maspat

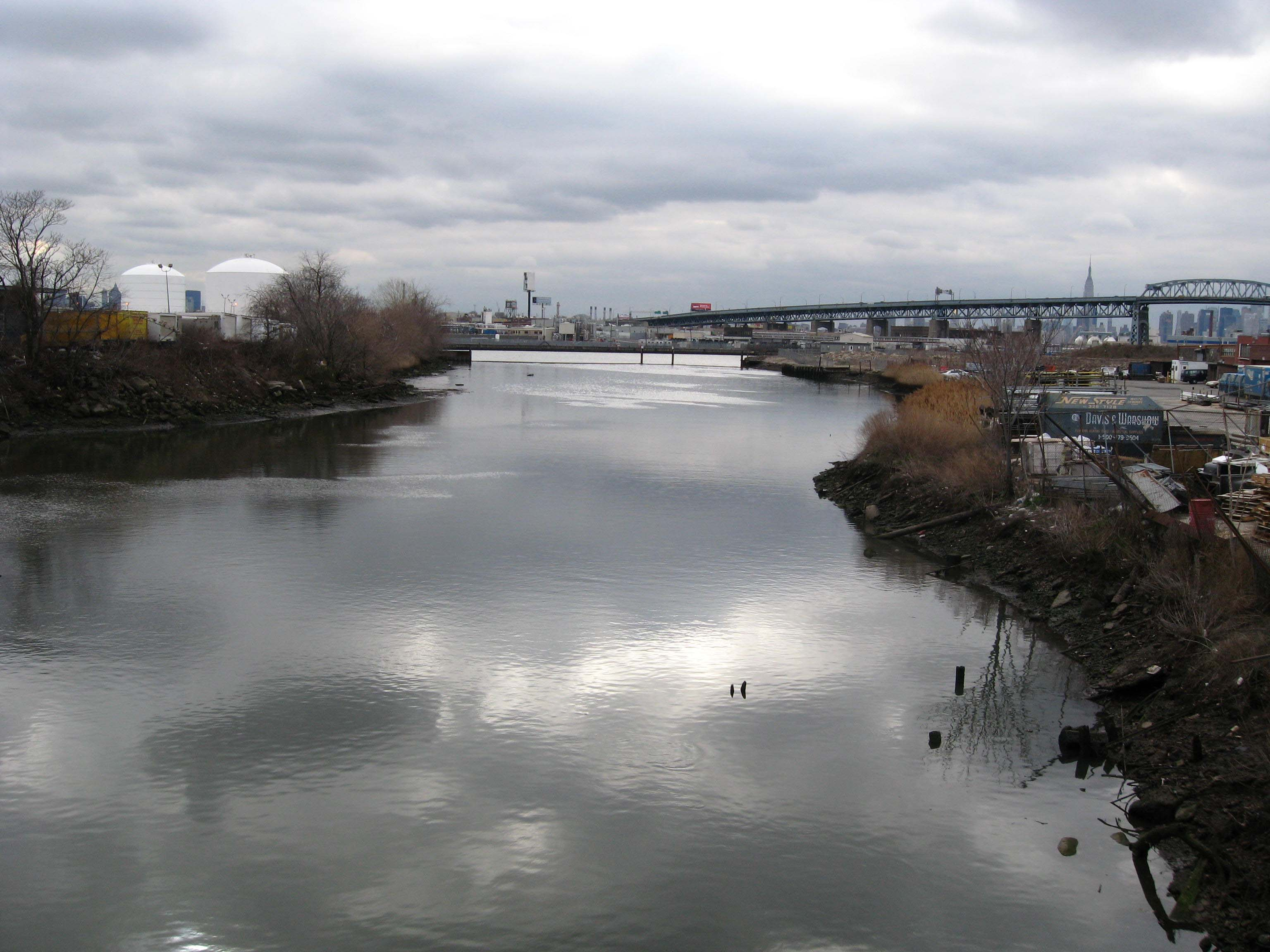
Maspeth Creek, the original reason for settling here, looking west towards Newtown Creek

=== Meghgectecock ===
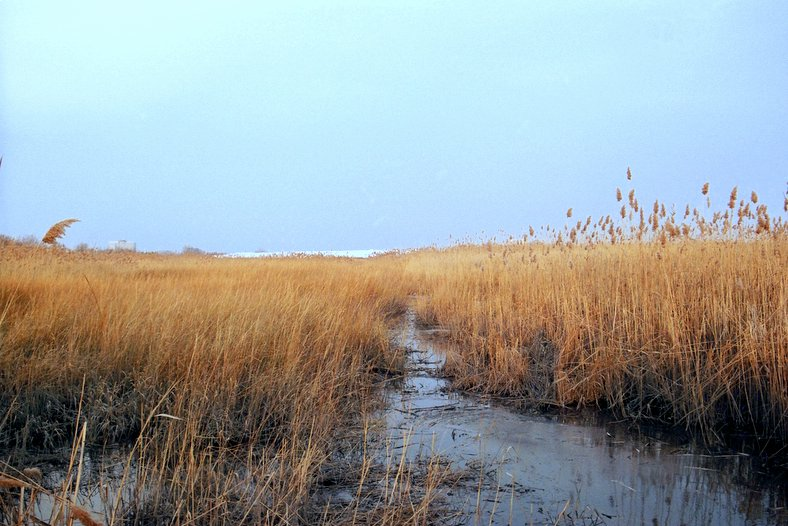

This is perhaps an approximation of masgichteu-cunk meaning where May-apples grow, from a moist-woodland perennial that bears edible yellow berries and used to describe the lobe of land between and the confluence of the Hackensack and Passaic Rivers at Newark Bay. It was part of Achter Col for the New Netherlanders and New Barbadoes Neck to the British. Contemporary: masgichteu meaning may apple.

=== Midwout ===
Middle woods, settled in 1652, in this case between Boswijck and Breuckelen, because of its dense forests. Later, was part of old Flatbush, situated between the towns of Gravesend and Flatlands.

=== Minisink ===
From the Munsee where the stones are gathered.

=== Mineola ===
Named in 1858 after an Algonquian Indian chief, Miniolagamika, meaning 'pleasant village'; later shortened and altered to "Mineola".

=== Minkakwa ===
On Bergen Neck between Pamrapo and Communipaw at Caven Point, first settled by New Netherlanders in 1647. Spellings include Minelque and Minkakwa meaning a place of good crossing probably because it was the most convenient pass between the two bays on either side of the neck, (or could mean place where the coves meet; in this case where they are closest to each other and, hence advantageous for portage.)

=== Minetta Lane ===
From "mintje kill", or small stream or brook.

=== Moodna ===
A corruption of the Dutch moordenaars, meaning murderers, hence Murderers' Creek, its original name. Local lore has it that the name came from the massacre of the Stacys, an early family of settlers, along its banks.

=== Moonachie ===
Ground hog, badger, or place of dug up earth (contemporary: monachgeu) for groundhog, and munhacke for badger and munhageen meaning to dig a hole

== N ==
=== Nassau ===
From the House of Nassau, one of the two houses of the House of Orange-Nassau, the house of the Dutch royal family. As in Nassau County or Nassau Lake.

=== Navesink ===
from the group of Lenape and their territory

=== Noort Rivier ===
Called Muhheakantuck or the river that flowed two ways in Unami.

The Noort Rivier was one of the three main rivers in New Netherland, the others being the Versche Rivier or Fresh River (likely because of its sweet water) and the Zuid Rivier or South River. In maritime usage, it still defines that part of the Hudson between Hudson County and Manhattan.

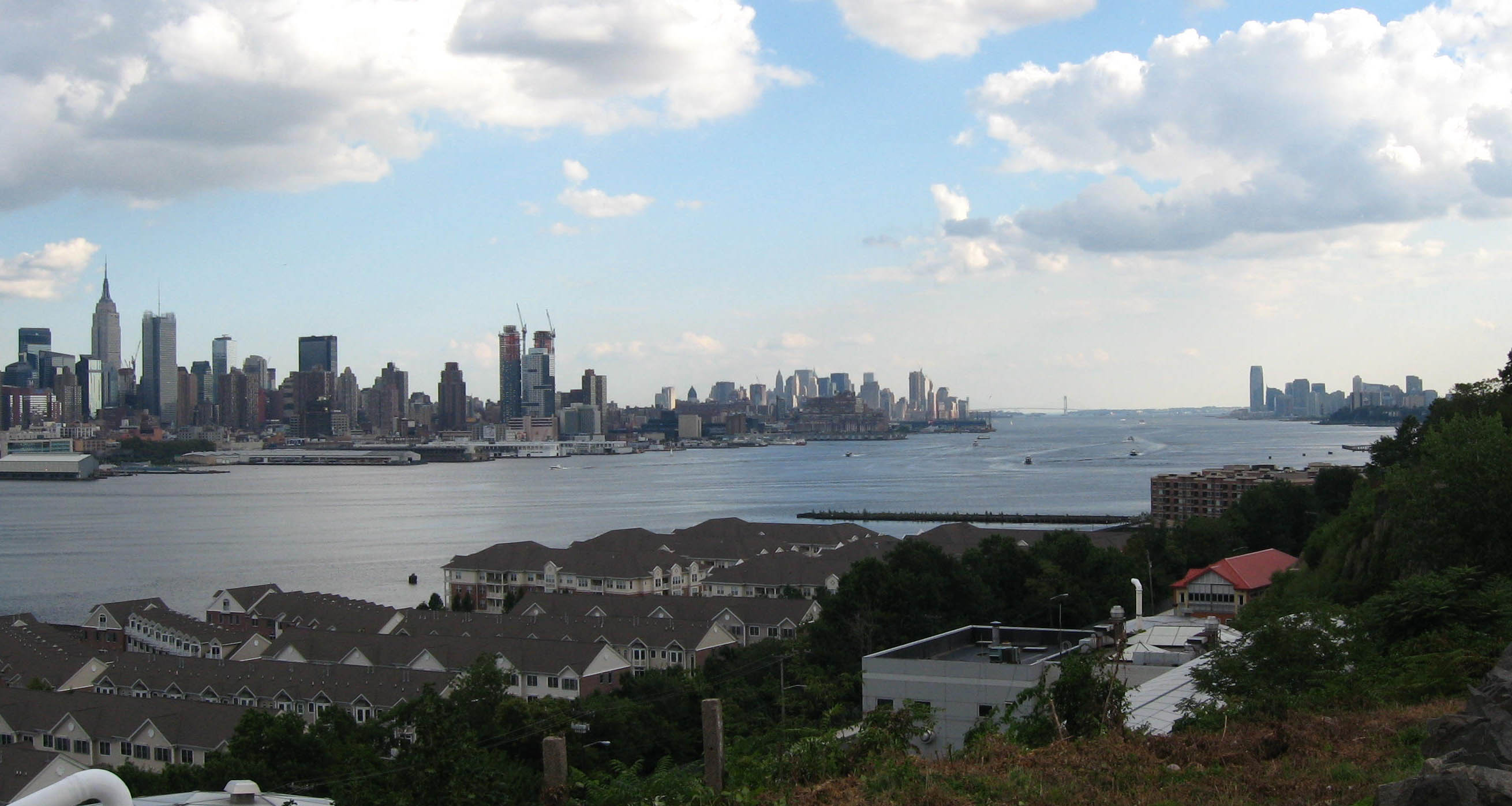
Noort Rivier or North River

=== Nieuw Dorp ===
Now New Dorp, meaning New Village, on Staten Island.

=== New Utrecht ===
Fifth of the six Dutch towns of Brooklyn; established in 1652 and named after major Dutch city.

=== Nyack ===
From Nay-ak meaning fishing place.

== O ==
=== Oester Baai ===
After 1650, Oyster Bay was the boundary between the Dutch New Amsterdam colony and the New England Confederation. The English, under Peter Wright, first settled in the area in 1653. The boundary was somewhat fluid which led to each group having their own Main Street.

=== Orange ===
From the House of Orange, one of the two houses of the House of Orange-Nassau, the house of the Dutch royal family, specifically William III of England, the former Prince of Orange. As in Orange County and The Oranges in Essex County.

=== Ossining ===
Early 17th-century Dutch maps of the Hudson River Valley show an Indian village, whose inhabitants were part of the Mohegan Tribe, named "Sint Sinck." That phrase, when translated, means "stone upon stone" and refers to the extensive beds of limestone found in the southern part of the village. In 1685, the Sint Sincks sold their land to Frederick Philipse who incorporated it into his land holdings known as the Manor of Philipsburg. The Manor comprised about 165,000 acres (668 km^{2}) and extended from Spuyten Duyvil Creek at the tip of Manhattan on the south to the Croton River just north of the Village of Ossining. The land was leased to tenant farmers of Dutch, French, and English origin.

=== Oude Dorpe ===
Old Town, the first permanent settlement on Staten Island in 1651.

=== Outwater ===
Possibly from John Outwater, a Revolutionary War hero. or from the town of Oudewater in the Dutch province of South Holland. Derivation from Uiterwaarden meaning a flood plain, of which there were many, this one at the foot of Paterson Plank Road.

=== Overpeck ===
Oever meaning a sloping bank and perk meaning border or boundary, hence at the water's edge, actually a riparian zone. Used in English as early as 1665. By the Lenape called Tantaqua, it was the site of semi-permanent village of the Hackensack Indians.

== P ==
=== Paerdegat ===
In Canarsie, the channel that connects to Jamaica Bay on the southern end of Brooklyn. A gat, or opening, and paarde from the word for horse. "Paerdegat" derives from the old Dutch 'paardengat', meaning "horse gate".

=== Pamrapo ===
On Bergen Neck between Constable Hook and Communipaw. Spellings include Pimbrepow, Pembrepock, Pemmerepoch, Pimlipo, Pemrepau, Pemrapaugh, and Pamrapough

=== Paramus ===
From Parampseapus or Peremessing meaning, perhaps, where there is worthwhile (or fertile) land or place of wild turkeys. Seapus or sipus is said to mean water, so the name may mean turkey river. Saddle River was also called Peramseapus. Spellings include Pyramus.

=== Pascack ===
Wet grass or place where grass is wet.

=== Passaic ===
The county, river and city are taken from pahsayèk, pahsaayeek and pasayak, meaning valley or water that flows through the valley. Spellings include: Pawsaick, Pissawack. Contemporary: Pachsa'jeek.

=== Paulus Hook ===
A tidal island, called Arresick by the Lenape the site where, in 1630, Michael Pauw's staked his claim for his attempted patroonship. Named after his agent who built a hut and ferry landing there, hoek or hoeck meaning a spit or point. Variations include Paulus Hoeck, Powles Hoek, Powles Hook

=== Pavonia ===
First settlement by the Europeans on west bank of Hudson River from its patroon Michael Reyniersz Pauw, Pavonia is a Latinized version of his surname, based on the word for peacock

=== Peekskill ===
From Peeck's Kil. New Amsterdam resident Jan Peeck made the first recorded contact with the native population of the area, then identified as "Sachoes". The date is not certain (possibly early 1640s), but agreements and merchant transactions took place, formalized into the Ryck's Patent Deed of 1684.

=== Pelham ===
From the ham or property of Thomas Pell of Fairfield, Connecticut, who, on 27 June 1654, purchased 9,166 acres (37.09 km^{2}) from the Siwanoy, and was part of the expansion of New England colonies into New Netherland

=== Pequannock ===
From Paquettahhnuake meaning cleared land ready or being readied for cultivation. Packanack is also contemporary variation of this place and possibly the Pacquanac-clan of Lenape.

=== Pompton ===
Has been cited by some sources to mean a place where they catch soft fish.

=== Ponck Hockie ===
Punkie †
Via Dutch, from Munsee [poŋkwəs] (Proto-Algonquian *penkwehsa, from *penkw-, "dust, ashes" + *-ehs, a diminutive suffix).

=== Poughkeepsie ===
/pəˈkɪpsiː/ from (roughly) U-puku-ipi-sing), meaning the reed covered lodge by the little-water place, referring to a spring or stream feeding into the Hudson River

== Q ==
=== Quarropas ===
Used as farmland by the Wappinger to early traders it was known as the White Plains, either from the groves of white balsam which are said to have covered it, or from the heavy mist that local tradition suggests hovered over the swamplands near the Bronx River.

== R ==
=== Ramapo ===
Name for the mountains and river and towns, meaning underneath the rock, spellings: Ramapough, Ramopock.

=== Raritan ===
The Raritan people, Raritan River, Raritan Bay, and towns take their name from a derivation of Naraticong, meaning river beyond the island (which, considering location, could be Staten Island). Some would believe that it comes from Roaton or Raritanghe, a tribe which had come from across the Hudson River and displaced the existing population of Sanhicans. Alternatively, Raritan is a Dutch pronunciation of wawitan or rarachons, meaning forked river or stream overflows.

=== Red Hook ===
From Roode Hoek. In Dutch hoek means point/angle or corner, and can refer to Red Hook, New York, village within it, or the neighborhood in Brooklyn, named for the red clay soil on the point of land projecting into the East River, settled by the New Netherlanders in 1636.

=== Rensselaerswyck ===
From the patroon Kiliaen van Rensselaer.

=== Robbins Reef ===
From the Dutch rob or robyn meaning seal collections of which would sometimes lay on the reef at low tide.

=== Rockaway ===
Place of sands, possibly from l'eckwa meaning sand and auke meaning place Spellings include requarkie Rechouwakie Rechaweygh, Rechquaakie, Reckowacky

=== Roodenburg ===
Red hills to describe the bluffs on the Quinnipiac River.

=== Rondout ===
A tributary of the Hudson River in Ulster and Sullivan counties Rondout comes from the fort, or redoubt, that was erected near its mouth The Dutch equivalent of the English word redoubt (a fort or stronghold), is reduyt. In the Dutch records of Wildwyck, however, the spelling used to designate this same fort is invariably Ronduyt during the earliest period, with the present form rondout (often capitalized) appearing as early as 22 November 1666. The Dutch word ronduyt is an adjective meaning "frankly" or "positively." The word could also be broken down into its components and translated, literally, "round-out." However, it seems unlikely that the inhabitants of Esopus had any special meaning in mind when they corrupted the Dutch word reduyt into ronduyt and rondout. Most likely, this corrupting process merely represented the simplification of a word (reduyt).

=== Rotterdam ===
After a major Dutch city which grew from a dam built on the river or stream Rotte in the 1260s.

=== Rhode Island ===
The official explanation by the State of Rhode Island is that Adriaen Block named the area "Roodt Eylandt" meaning "red island" in reference to the red clay that lined the shore, and that the name was later anglicized when the region came under British rule.

== S ==
=== Sandy Hook ===
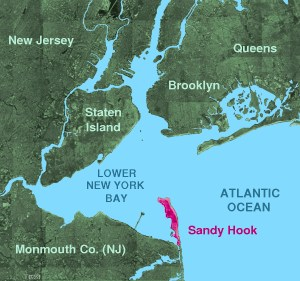
Sand Hoek

Sandy Hook Sant Hoek, meaning sand corner/angle, sometimes called Sand Punt, the peninsula around which most settlers to Fort Amsterdam, Fort Orange, Staten Eylandt, and Lange Eylandt, and Bergen sailed before entering The Narrows.

=== Schenectady ===
Originally part of territory of the Mohawk, who called the settlement at Fort Orange Schau-naugh-ta-da meaning over the pine plains. Eventually, this word entered the lexicon of the Dutch settlers, but the meaning was reversed, and the name referred to the bend in the Mohawk River where the city lies today.

=== Schuylkill ===
Schuylkill (Dutch pronunciation: [ˈsxœylkɪl]) by its European discoverer, Arendt Corssen of the Dutch West India Company translated hidden river and refers to the river's confluence with the Delaware River at League Island, which was nearly hidden by dense vegetation. Perhaps, more properly, hideout creek Native: Ganshohawanee, meaning "rushing and roaring waters," or "Manaiunk".

=== Secaucus ===
Sukit meaning black and achgook meaning snake in Lenape, hence black snakes. Spellings include Sekakes, Sikakes, Sickakus. Contemporary: seke, meaning black and xkuk or achgook meaning snake. Locally, pronounced "SEE-kaw-cus", with the accent on the first syllable, not the second as often used by non-natives. Snake Hill, in Secaucus, is a geolologic intrusion in the midst of the Meadowlands.

=== Sewanhacky ===
Sometimes place of shells, referring to Long Island, from whence the native population harvested shells for the production of zewant or wampum. Spellings include Sewanhacking, Suanhacky, Sewahaka.

=== Sicomac ===
Said to mean resting place for the departed or happy hunting ground since this area of Wyckoff, according to tradition, was the burial place of many Native Americans, possibly including Oratam, sagamore of the Hackensack Indians Contemporary schikamik meaning hole or grave or machtschikamikunk meaning a burial place.

=== Sing-Sing ===
From a band of Wappinger (in present day Westchester County).

=== Spuyten Duyvil ===
A one-mile (1.6 km)-long channel connecting the Hudson and Harlem Rivers. "Spuyten Duyvil" (modern Dutch: Spuitende Duivel) means Devil's Spout, a reference to the strong and wild currents.

=== Staten Island ===
Staaten Eylandt, meaning States Island, which to the Lenape, was known as Aquehonga, Manacknong, or Eghquaons (Jackson, 1995). Named for the governing body of the 17th-century United Provinces of the Netherlands, the States-General.

=== Suckiaug ===
Black Fertile River-Enhanced Earth, good for planting, as the land along the river valley that was site Fort Huys de Goede Hoop or Fort House of Good Hope, the 1623 settlement of what is now Hartford

=== Sutphin ===
Sutphin Boulevard, Queens, New York, named after the settlers family Van Sutphin or Van Sutphen, referring to their origins from the Dutch town and county of Zutphen, a hanseatic town, one of the oldest cities in the Netherlands. ‘Zutphen’ meaning ‘south fen (marsh land)’.

== T ==
=== Tantaqua ===
Overpeck Creek, site of Hackensack semi-permanent village

=== Tappan ===
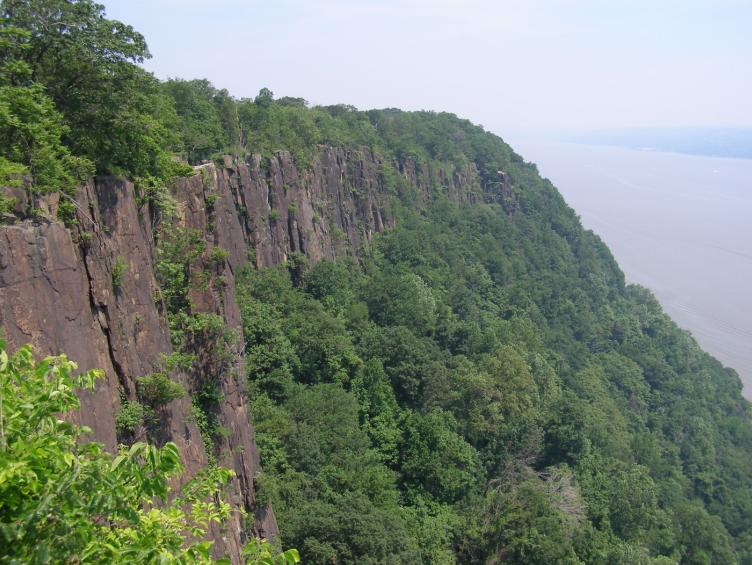
The Palisades

The region radiating from Palisades Interstate Park and its inhabitants as named by New Netherlanders, who spelled it as Tappaen. Site of the "bouwerie" Vriessendael.

While it could be derived from Tuphanne, meaning cold water, it is more likely related to the contemporary petapan, meaning dawn, or petapaniui, meaning at the break of dawn. This relates to their kin across the river, the Wappinger, whose name is derived from the Algonquian people of the east or easterners (Contemporary: Wapaneu meaning easterly and Wapanke meaning tomorrow).

=== Teaneck ===
Origin and meaning are uncertain, though possibly may mean the woods

=== Tenafly ===
From Dutch Tiene Vly or Ten Swamps given by settlers in 1688. Alternatively, from the Dutch expression "t'eene vallei (or vlij)," meaning at a meadow or willow meadows from tene meaning willow and vlaie (alternatively spelled fly/vly/vley) meaning meadow or swamp.

=== Throg's Neck ===
From John Throckmorton, an Englishman who settled in the area called Vriedelandt by the Dutch

=== Turtle Bay ===
From duetel (modern Dutch: deuvel) meaning dowel, used to describe the original shape of the inlet on the East River.

== V ==
=== Valatie ===
Village in the town of Kinderhook, New York. Settled by the Dutch in 1665, who named this area "Vaaltje", which means "little falls".

=== Verplanck ===
Hamlet in the town of Cortlandt, from an early (1630s) settler

=== Versche Rivier ===
The Fresh River, now the Connecticut River, likely because of it sweet, rather than brackish water. Note that, while "vers" is Dutch for "fresh" in the sense of new and unspoilt, fresh water is called zoet water "sweet water", not vers water

=== Vriessendael ===
A small bowery or homestead established in 1640 at today's Edgewater, meaning Vries' Valley, after its owner, David Pietersen de Vries.

=== Vriedelandt ===
Now Throgs Neck from John Throckmorton, an Englishman the Dutch allowed to settle in the area in 1642.

== W ==
=== Wall Street ===
From the Dutch wal meaning rampart erected in 1654 to protect New Amsterdam from possible invasion by New England during the first Anglo-Dutch War.

=== Wallabout ===
From Wallen Bocht or Wallon's Bow, referring to the curve of the bay on the East River. Spellings include Waaleboght From the River Waal, an arm of the Rhine long referred to as "inner harbor".

=== Wallkill ===
Known as Twischsawkin, meaning the land where plums abound. At least three prehistoric rock shelters have been found in archaeological digs in the region. For the indigenous peoples, it was not only important for its arable land but for its geological resources. The river and its valley are abundant in flint and chert, from which they made spear points and arrowheads. European settlers of the region named it first the Palse River, after New Paltz. Later, when it was clear that the river continued well beyond the original New Paltz patent, it took after the Waal river in their native Netherlands. However, more likely is that the name derives from the 'Walen' or Walloons, referring to the Huguenots who fled from their homelands in the western border area of France and present-day Belgium to the Pfalz and from there to New Netherlands. They worked their way down it from the Hudson Valley in the 17th century, and were followed by the British after the colony changed hands.

=== Wappinger ===
From the Algonquian word for easterner, approximately 18 loosely associated bands of Native Americans whose territory in the 17th century spread along the eastern side of the Hudson River. The town of Wappinger, the village of Wappingers Falls and Wappinger Creek Among the many phonetic spellings employed by early European settlers are Wappinck, Wapping, Wappingo, and Wawping, Wappans, Wappings, and Wappani, and Wappinghs, all apparent corruptions of the Algonquian word for "easterners". Other sources suggest it may have been a native corruption of wapendragers, the Dutch word for "weapon-bearers".

=== Watchung ===
The place of mountains from watchtsu, which describes the three ridges west of the Meadowlands.

=== Watervliet ===
Part of patroonship Rensselaerswyck, meaning "water flow", as in the land between high and low tide. Similar to Watervliet in Belgium on the North Sea coast.

=== Weehawken ===
Variously interpreted as or rocks that look like rows of trees or at the end of (the Palisades or stream that flowed from them.) and place of gulls. Spelling have included: Awiehawken, Wiehacken, Weehauk, Weehawk, Weehock, Wiceaken,Wihaken, Wyhaken, and Wiehachan Peter Minuit, first governor of New Netherland, sailed to the new world upon a ship called The Seagull or Het "Meeuwken, which may have led to one interpretation of the Lenape.

=== Weequahic ===
Head of the cove.

=== Wilhelmus ===
Short-lived fort on Zuyd Rivier in 1625, likely so called from Het Wilhelmus (Nl-Het Wilhelmus2.ogg) (English translation: The William), a song which tells of Willem van Oranje, his life and why he is fighting for the Dutch people. It remained popular with the Dutch people since its creation. and became, in 1932, the national anthem of the Netherlands and is the oldest national anthem in the world

=== Wiltwyk ===
Settlement on west bank of Hudson River established in 1652, possibly meaning Wild District, since at the time farmers were engage in an ongoing series of raids and reprisals known as the Esopus Wars. (It is today known as Kingston, New York.)

=== Wyckoff ===
Most commonly believed origin to be from the Lenape word wickoff meaning high ground, or that it is from wickok meaning water. A less widely held theory is that the town was named for Brooklyn judge Pieter Claesen Wyckoff (1625–1694). The surname comes from the Dutch words wyk, meaning district and hof, meaning court. Alternatively, the name is Friesian, its most common meaning in the Northern Germanic languages is a settlement on a bay. The Wykhof estate from where Pieter Claessen emigrated is located near the Ems River Bay, about 5 miles south of Norden, Lower Saxony, Germany.

== Y ==
=== Yonkers ===
From Jonkheer or Jonker meaning young gentleman (and in effect, Esquire), the title borne by proprietor of homestead which included the land where the city is situated, Adriaen van der Donck.

== Z ==
=== Zuyd River ===
South River, now the Delaware River

=== Zwaanendael ===
Sometimes Swaanendael meaning swan valley. Site of first Dutch colonial settlement in Delaware, in 1631, was destroyed, and later became Lewes.

== See also ==
- List of place names of Dutch origin in the United States
- Vlaie
- New Netherland settlements
- Forts of New Netherland
- List of place names in New England of aboriginal origin
- Indigenous peoples of Long Island
