= Sutphen (surname) =

Sutphen is a surname. Notable people with the surname include:

- C.H. Sutphen, founder of Sutphen, an American emergency service vehicle manufacturing company
- Jeff Sutphen (born 1977), American actor, producer, and game show host
- Joyce Sutphen (born 1949), American poet
- Mona Sutphen (born 1967), American government official
- Van Tassel Sutphen (1861–1945), American playwright, librettist, novelist, and editor

== See also ==
- Sutphin, another surname
- Sutphen, Kansas
- Zutphen
