= New Netherlander =

Historical inhabitants of colonial New York, New Jersey, Delaware

New Netherlanders (Dutch: Nieuwe Nederlanders) were residents of New Netherland, the seventeenth-century colonial outpost of the Republic of the Seven United Netherlands on the northeastern coast of North America, centered around New York Harbor, the Hudson Valley, and New York Bay, and in the Delaware Valley. There were short lived outposts in Connecticut and Rhode Island.

The population of New Netherland was not all ethnically Dutch, but had a variety of ethnic and linguistic backgrounds, including: other European ethnic groups (Germans, Scandinavians, French, Scots, English, Irish, Italians, and Croats); indigenous Amerindian tribes such as Algonquians and Iroquoians; Sephardic Jews (Jews of Spanish and Portuguese backgrounds) both from the Netherlands itself and the then-recently lost colony of Dutch Brazil; and West Africans, the last mostly having been brought as slaves.

Though the colony officially existed only between 1609 and 1674, the descendants of the original settlers played a prominent role in colonial America. New Netherland culture characterized the region (today's Capital District, Hudson Valley, New York City, western Long Island, northern and central New Jersey, and the Delaware Valley) for two centuries. The concepts of civil liberties and pluralism introduced in the colony are supposed to have later become a mainstay of American political and social life.

== Background ==
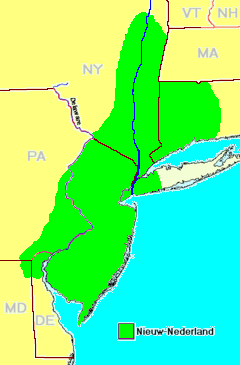
New Netherland colony, New Amsterdam capital

In 1621, the Dutch West India Company was founded for the purpose of trade. The WIC was chartered by the States-General and given the authority to make contracts and alliances with princes and natives, build forts, administer justice, appoint and discharge governors, soldiers, and public officers, and promote trade in New Netherland. The colonial administration was relatively autonomous and the Company preferred to rule through agreements with local leaders.

On the Atlantic coast were their bases for the slave trade and smuggling. In the Caribbean and partly in Brazil and Suriname, plantations were worked by native Indians and African slaves. There were around 1,000 whites there, joined by Brazilian Jews, attracted by religious freedom which was granted to all the settlers.

== History ==
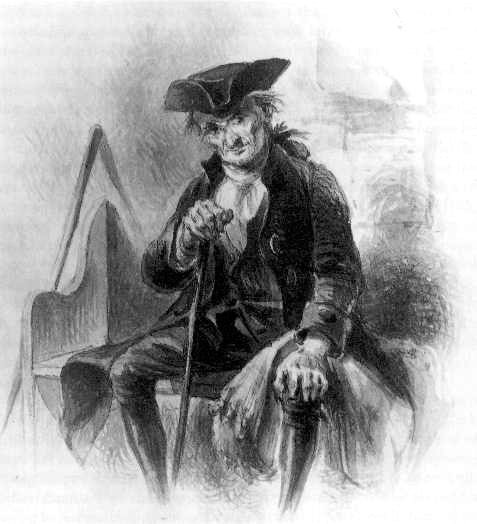
Diedrich Knickerbocker, a fictional Dutchman from New Amsterdam

The Dutch set up two forts, Fort Nassau in 1614 and Fort Orange in 1624, both named for the Dutch noble House of Orange-Nassau. New Amsterdam was founded in 1624.

The southern outpost on the Delaware Bay was discontinued to focus the Company's resources on the area around New Amsterdam. The Dutch finally established a garrison at Bergen, which allowed settlement west of the Hudson within New Netherland. Due to a war between the Mohawk and Mahican tribes in 1625, the women and children upriver at Fort Orange were re-located. In the spring of 1626, Minuit arrived to succeed Willem Verhulst, who had authorized the construction of a fort at the tip of Manhattan Island. Fort Amsterdam was designed by Cryn Fredericksz. Construction started in 1625.

The third Director of New Netherland, Peter Minuit, was a German-born Huguenot who worked for the Dutch West India Company. Minuit purchased the island of Manhattan from the Lenape.

In 1630, the managers of the West India Company, in order to tempt the ambition of capitalists, offered certain exclusive privileges to the members of the company. The realization that greater inducements had to be offered to increase the development of the colony led the West India Company to the creation of the so-called "patroon system". In 1629, the West India Company issued its charter of "Freedoms and Exemptions" by which it was declared that any member of the Company who could bring to and settle 50 persons over the age of 15 in New Netherland, should receive a liberal grant of land to hold as patroon, or lord, with the exception, per Article III, of the island of Manhattan. This land could have a frontage of 16 miles (26 km) if on one side of a river, or 8 miles (13 km) if situated on both sides. The patroon would be chief magistrate on his land, but disputes of more than 50 guilders could be appealed to the Director and his Council in New Amsterdam. The first of this vast estate or colony was established in 1630, on the banks of the Hudson River. Over a period of four years was entitled to a plot with 25 miles of front to the river, with exclusive rights to hunting and fishing, and civil jurisdiction and criminal on earth. In turn, the patroon brought livestock, implements and buildings. Tenants pay rent to the agent and gave him first option on surplus crops. The only restriction was that the colony had to be outside the island of Manhattan. A pattern of these colonies was the Manor of Rensselaerswyck.

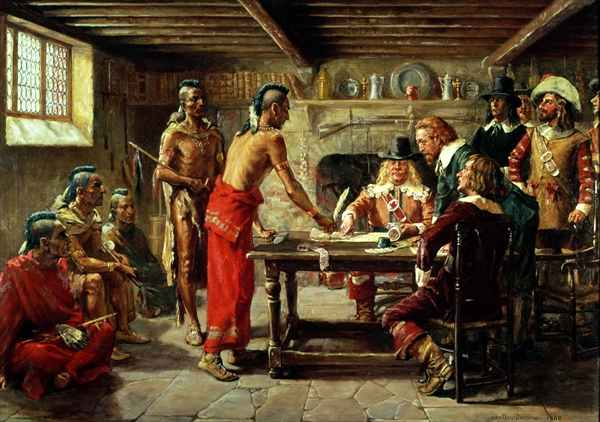
1642 Peace Treaty between Indians and New Amsterdam

Everardus Bogardus the second minister of the Dutch Reformed Church, the oldest established church in present-day New York, frequently was combative with the Director-General of the New Netherlands and their management of the Dutch West India Company colony, going up against the often-drunk Wouter van Twiller and famously denouncing Willem Kieft from the pulpit during the colony's disastrously bloody Kieft's War (1643–1645). He stepped up his denouncements when Kieft tried to place a tax on beer. Bogardus himself has been described as a stout and rarely sober individual. A Council of Twelve Men was chosen on 1641 by the residents of New Amsterdam to advise the Director of New Netherland, Willem Kieft, on relations with the Native Americans due to the murder of Claes Swits. the council was not permanent, The next time a council of eight men was created. Peter Stuyvesant arrived in New Amsterdam on May 11, 1647 to replace Willem Kieft as Director-General of the New Netherland colony.

Though the region became a British colony in 1674, it retained its "Dutch" character for many years as early settlers and their descendants developed the land and economy.

== Population ==
Population estimates are for the European and African population and do not include the Native Americans.

- 1628: 270
- 1630: 300
- 1640: 500
- 1650: 800 - 1,000
- 1664: 9,000

== Demographics ==
Among the many settlers who sailed from the United Provinces of the Netherlands were Dutch, Flemish, Walloon, Huguenot, German, and Scandinavian people, who are sometimes called "New Netherland Dutch".

The first non-Native American to settle in Manhattan was Juan Rodriguez (Jan Rodrigues in Dutch), a Dominican man of African and Portuguese descent born in Santo Domingo. Early ships to the new colony carried mostly Walloon passengers and Africans brought as slaves, many of whom later became free. The black population is dated to the importation of eleven black slaves in 1625. African slaves belonging the Dutch West India Company may have been brought directly, or via the Caribbean or other European colonies. When the colony fell, the company freed all its slaves, establishing early on a nucleus of free negros.

Sephardi Jews arrived after the loss of Dutch Brazil. King Manuel I of Portugal populated the São Tomé and Príncipe islands, in the slave trade route, with about 2,000 entrepreneur Sephardic Jews refugees after their expulsion from Spain. The first group of Spanish and Portuguese Jews arrived in New York (New Amsterdam) in September 1654.

Sarah Rapelje was the first female child of European parentage born in the colony of New Netherland.

An early settler from Africa was a wealthy Muslim, and land owner, Anthony Janszoon van Salee a religious refugee from Spain. From 1340 Portugal colonized islands in the Atlantic. Colonization was a success and provided a growing population for other Atlantic colonies. The route from Europe passed through the Azores islands. By 1490 were 2,000 Flemings living in the islands of Terceira, Pico, Faial, São Jorge and Flores. Because there was such a large Flemish settlement, the Azores became known as the Flemish Islands or the Isles of Flanders. Prince Henry the Navigator was responsible for this settlement. His sister, Isabel, was married to Duke Philip of Burgundy who ruled Flanders. There were also Portuguese and Basque fishermen and sailors.

Pietro Cesare Alberti, from Venice, is regarded as the first Italian settler in what is now New York State, having arrived in New Amsterdam in 1635.

Swedish immigrant Jonas Bronck is believed to be the origin behind the name of the Bronx River, which gave the name of the Bronx borough.

=== Language ===
Though Dutch was the official language, and likely the lingua franca of the colony, it was but one of many spoken there, as many as eighteen by the 1630s. The Algonquin language had many dialects. Walloons and Huguenots tended to speak French. Scandinavians brought their tongues, as did the Germans. Africans may have spoken their mother tongues as well. English was on the rise to become the vehicular language in world trade, and settlement by individuals or groups of English-speakers started early. The arrival of refugees from New Holland in Brazil may have brought more Portuguese, Spanish, and Judaeo-Spanish speakers. Commercial activity in the harbor, which included pirateering, could have been transacted simultaneously in any of a number of tongues. In some cases people Batavianized their names to conform with the Dutch vernacular and official language, which also greatly influenced place naming.

English language speakers mostly arrived from New England and Long Island. In mid-seventeenth century, for political and religious unrest in England, emigrated to the Atlantic coast of North America, numerous Protestant Puritans, who settled in New Amsterdam. Among the early English settlers were two religious leaders, Anabaptist Lady Deborah Moody in 1645 and Anne Hutchinson, who took refuge in the colony, as well as Elizabeth Hallet (née Fones), niece of Massachusetts Governor John Winthrop, who sought refuge from religious persecution.

=== Religion ===
Although the Dutch West India Company had established the Reformed Church as the official religious institution of New Netherland, the early Dutch settlers planted the concept of tolerance as a legal right in North America as per explicit orders in 1624. They had to attract, "through attitude and by example", the natives and nonbelievers to God's word "without, on the other hand, to persecute someone by reason of his religion, and to leave everyone the freedom of his conscience."

== Relations with the Lenape ==
The arrival of the immigrants did not necessarily mean the departure of the indigenous people. There were fundamental differences in conceptions of property rights between the Europeans and the Lenape. The concept of ownership as understood by the Swannekins, or salt water people, was foreign to the Wilden, or natives. The exchange of gifts in the form of sewant or manufactured goods was perceived as trade agreement and defense alliance which included farming, hunting, and fishing rights. Often, the Indians did not vacate the property or reappeared as their migrational patterns dictated. The River Indians, such as the Wecquaesgeek, Hackensack, and Canarsee, within whose territories many European settlements were established, had regular and frequent contact with the New Netherlanders.

After the Dutch arrival in the 1620s, the Lenape were successful in restricting Dutch settlement until the 1660s to Pavonia in present-day Jersey City along the Hudson. The Lenape's quick adoption of trade goods, and their need to trap furs to meet high European demand, resulted in their disastrous over-harvesting of the beaver population in the lower Hudson Valley. With the fur resources exhausted, the Dutch shifted their operations to present-day upstate New York. The Lenape produced wampum in the vicinity of Manhattan Island, temporarily forestalling the negative effects of this decline in trade.

Dutch settlers founded a colony at present-day Lewes, Delaware, on June 3, 1631, and named it Zwaanendael (Swan Valley). The colony had a short existence, as in 1632 a local band of Lenape Indians killed the 32 Dutch settlers after a misunderstanding escalated over Lenape defacement of the insignia of the Dutch West India Company. In 1634, the Iroquoian-speaking Susquehannock went to war with the Lenape over access to trade with the Dutch at New Amsterdam. They defeated the Lenape, and some scholars believe that the Lenape may have become tributaries to the Susquehannock. Lenape population fell, due mostly to epidemics of infectious diseases carried by Europeans, such as measles and smallpox, to which they had no natural immunity.

== See also ==
- Category:People from New Netherland
- Congregation Shearith Israel
- Dutch American
- German Palatines
- Huguenot Street Historic District
- Jersey Dutch (incl. Negro Dutch)
- New Netherland settlements
- Toponymy of New Netherland
- Spanish-Portuguese Jews in the United States
