= Q6 (New York City bus) =

Bus route in Queens, New York

q6
- Sutphin/Rockaway Boulevards
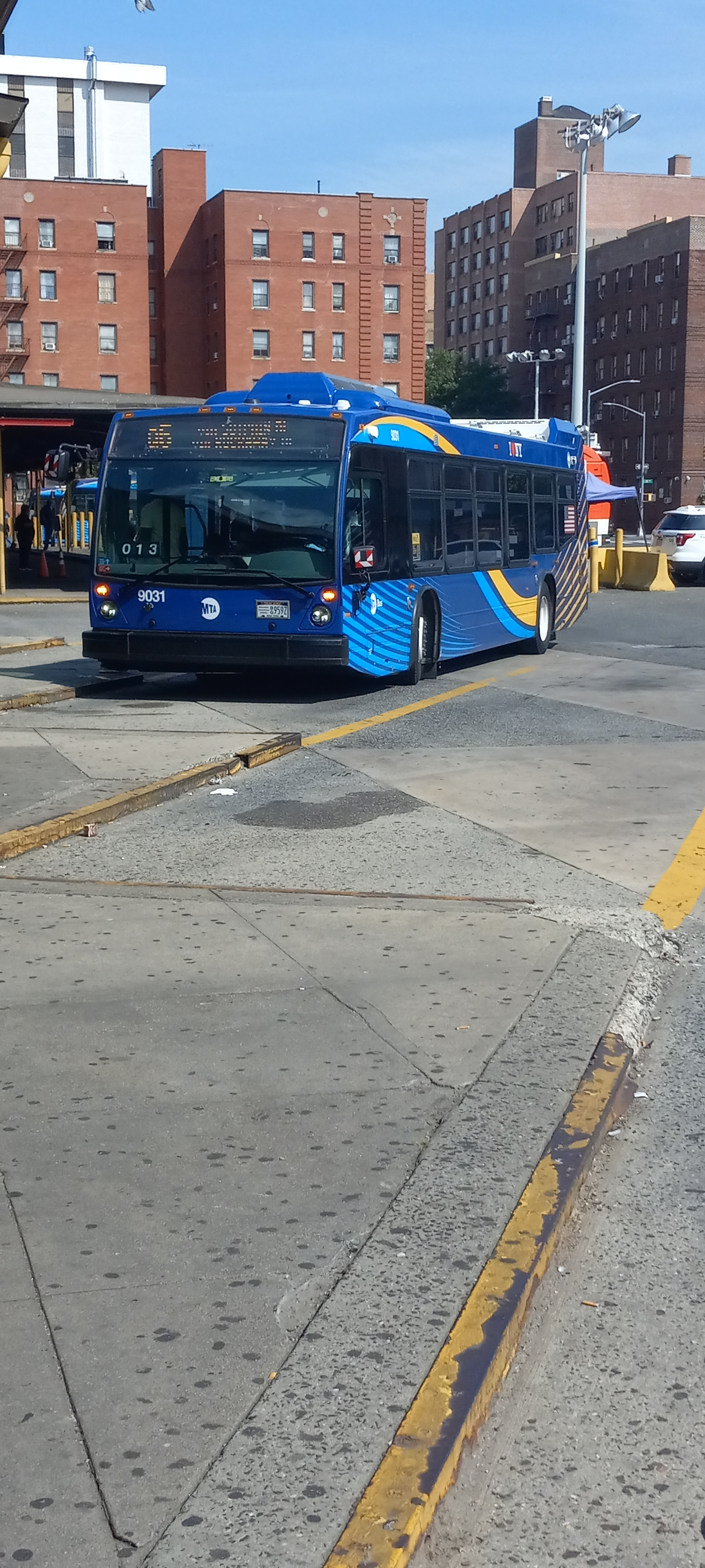
- A 2023 Nova Bus LFS (9031) on the JFK Airport-bound Q6 leaving the 165th Street Bus Terminal.

Overview
- System: MTA Regional Bus Operations
- Operator: MTA Bus Company
- Garage: JFK Depot
- Vehicle: Nova Bus LFS; New Flyer Xcelsior XD40
- Night-time: Every 30 minutes

Route
- Locale: Queens, New York, U.S.
- Communities served: Jamaica, South Jamaica, Springfield Gardens
- Start: Jamaica - 168th Street Bus Terminal
- Via: Sutphin Boulevard, Rockaway Boulevard
- End: JFK Airport - Eastern Road & JFK Postal Facility
- Length: 5.2 miles (8.4 km)

Service
- Operates: All times
- Annual patronage: 1,936,700 (2025)
- Transfers: Yes
- Timetable: Q6

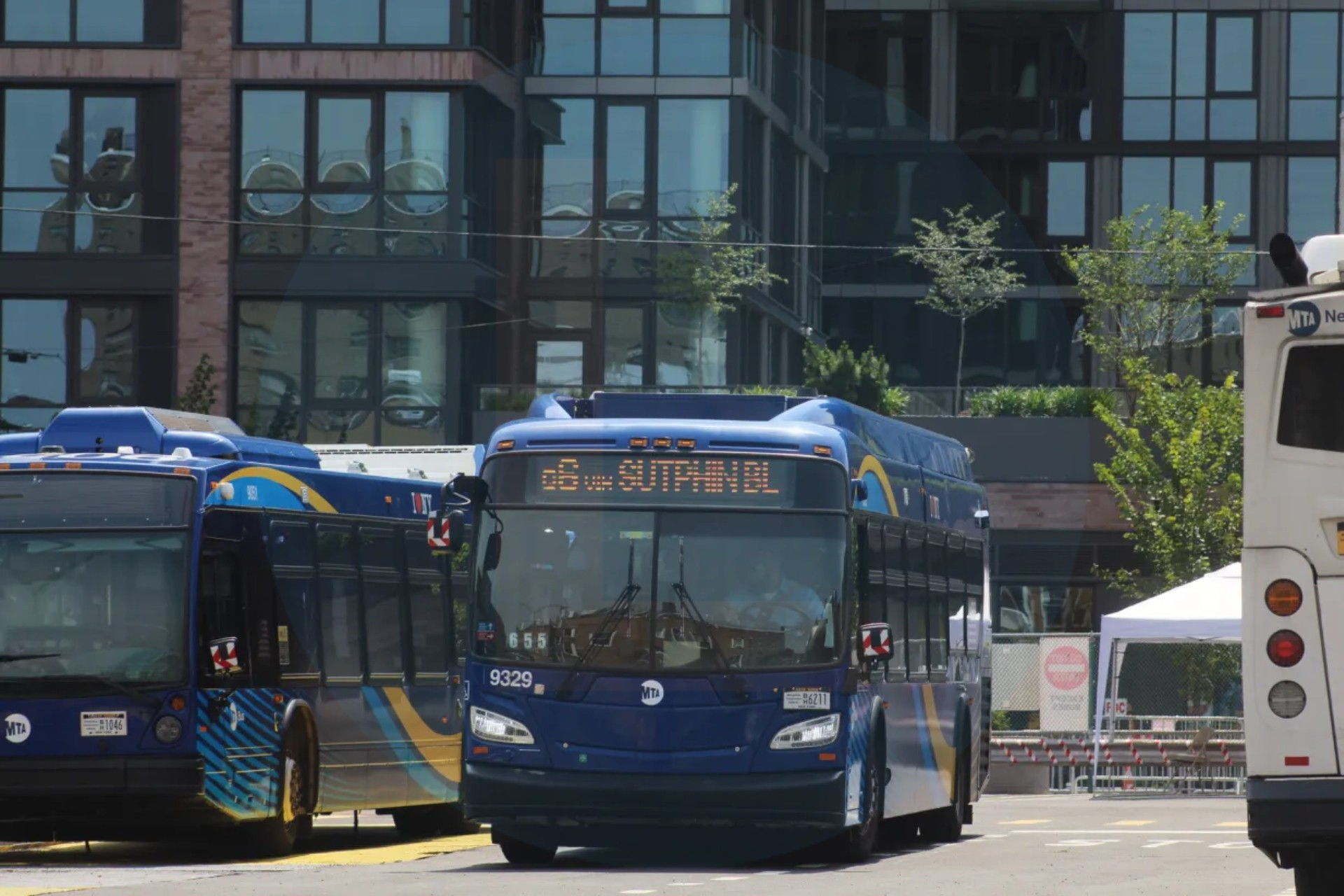
A 2023 XD40 (9329) on the Q6 terminating at the new 168th Street Terminal

The Q6 constitutes a bus route between Jamaica, Queens, and John F. Kennedy International Airport in Queens, New York City, but does not serve the terminals at JFK Airport. Originally operated by Green Bus Lines since 1922, it has been operated by the MTA Bus Company since 2005. Limited-stop service, which began in 2010, operated in the peak direction during rush hours until 2025.

== Route description ==
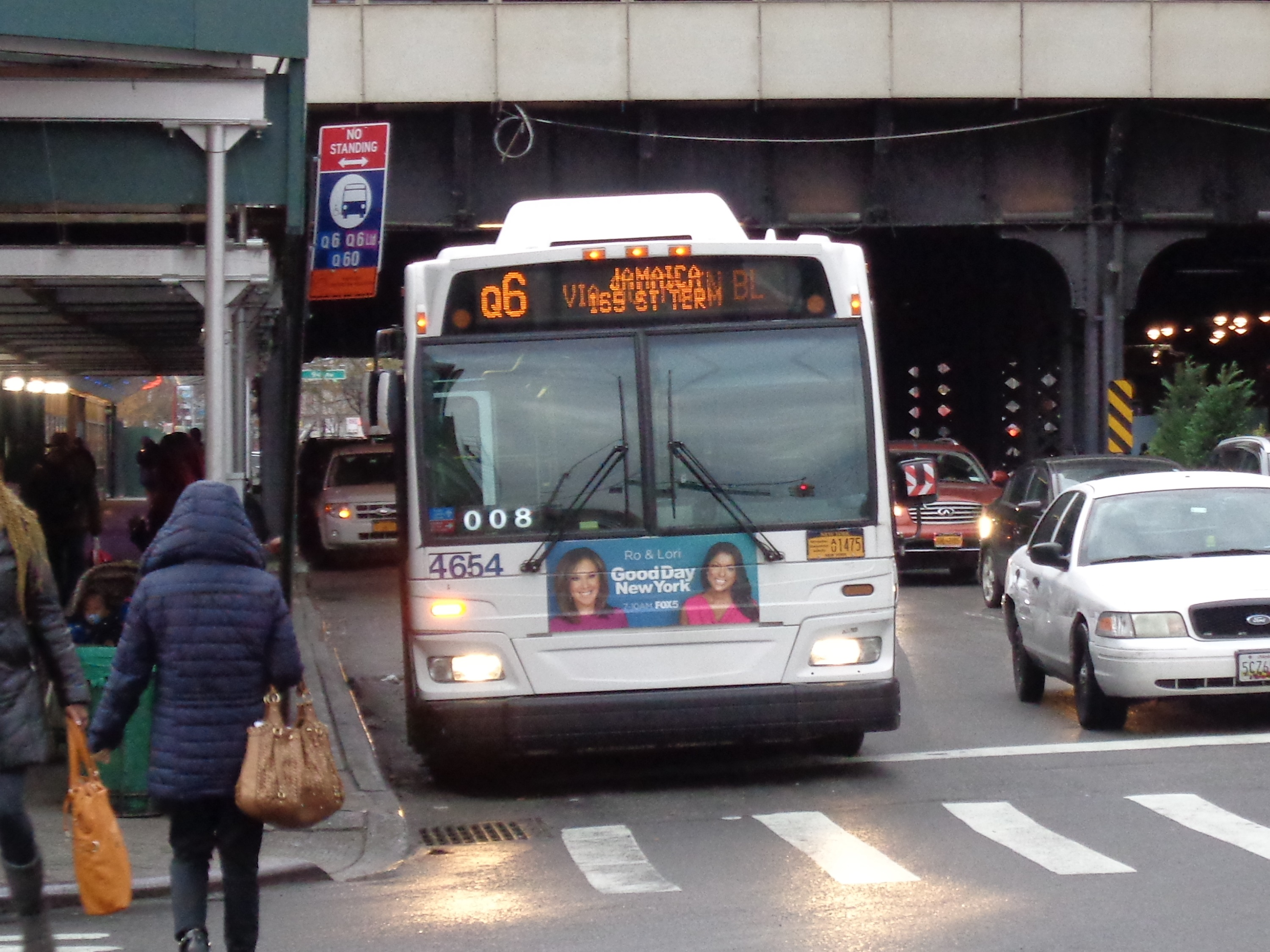
A 2010 Orion VII NG HEV (4654) on the Jamaica-bound Q6 at Sutphin Boulevard/Archer Avenue

The Q6 starts at 168th Street Bus Terminal, using 169th Street southbound at 168th Street northbound to reach Jamaica Avenue, heading west on it until Sutphin Boulevard. It turns south on Sutphin Boulevard until reaching the southern end at Rockaway Boulevard and running east on that street until Nassau Expressway, crossing it to turn east on North Boundary Road and following Eastern Road until terminating by the JFK Postal Facility.

Until 2025, The Q6 Limited operates rush hours in the peak direction (to Jamaica AM, from Jamaica PM), making limited stops north of Rockaway Boulevard. When the Q6 Limited operates, some Q6 locals operate to/from Rockaway Boulevard. The Q6 operates out of the JFK Depot.

== History ==
The bus started operating on July 19, 1922 by Queens Bus Corporation. It was then taken over by Green Bus Lines. The northern terminal was moved to Jamaica Union Bus Terminal (Jamaica Avenue and Brewer Boulevard) on August 16, 1936. By 1975, its terminals in Jamaica were Sutphin Boulevard and Hillside Avenue, and 165th Street and Archer Avenue. On October 30, 1989, all Q6 service was rerouted to serve the 165th Street Bus Terminal.

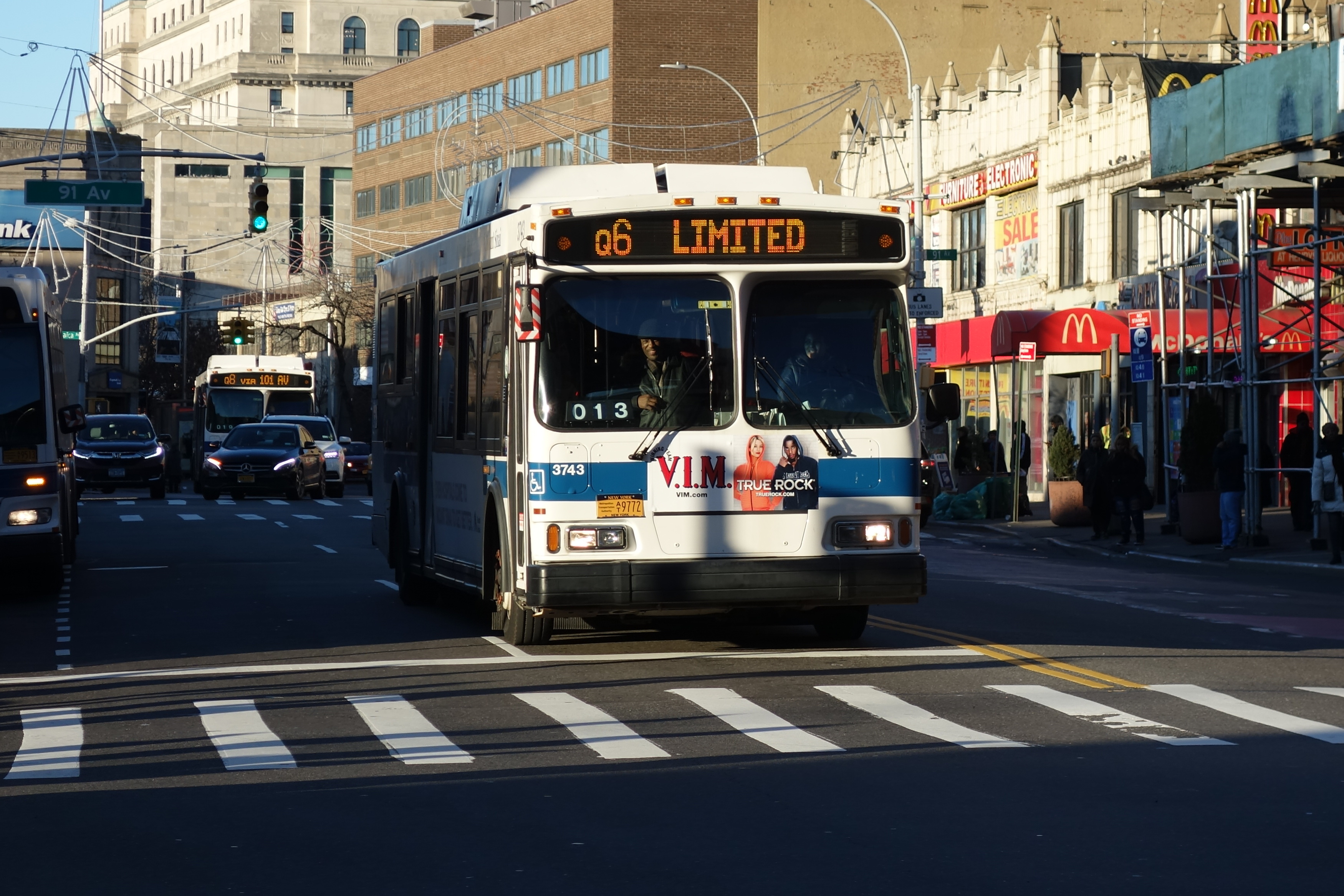
A 2007 Orion VII OG HEV (3743) on the JFK Airport-bound Q6 Limited at Sutphin/Archer in Jan. 2019

The Q6 Limited-stop service was added on April 19, 2010.

=== Queens bus redesign ===
In December 2019, the MTA released a draft redesign of the Queens bus network. As part of the redesign, the current Q6 would have been discontinued, with the QT20 replacing service on Sutphin Boulevard and the QT62 bus would replace service on Rockaway Boulevard. The redesign was delayed due to the COVID-19 pandemic in New York City in 2020, and the original draft plan was dropped due to negative feedback.

A revised plan was released in March 2022. As part of the new plan, the Q6 would still be discontinued and have service on Sutphin Boulevard replaced by an extended Q1 and service on Rockaway Boulevard replaced by a streamlined Q7.

A final bus-redesign plan was released in December 2023. The final plan preserved the Q6 and did not make changes to its routing, although the Q6 would be converted into a limited route with slightly fewer stops.

On December 17, 2024, addendums to the final plan were released. Among these, current frequencies on the Q6 will be retained. On January 29, 2025, the current plan was approved by the MTA Board, and the Q6 was later reverted to become an all-local line (weekday rush hour Limited-Stop Service will be discontinued). The Queens Bus Redesign went into effect in two different phases during Summer 2025, and the Q6 is part of Phase II, which began on August 31, 2025. Limited stop service was discontinued on that date.
