= Raritan =

Raritan may refer to:

== Places ==
- Raritan, Illinois, a village
- Raritan, New Jersey, a borough in Somerset County
- Raritan Bay, a bay between the U.S. states of New York and New Jersey
- Raritan High School, the public high school in Hazlet, New Jersey
- Raritan River, a tributary of Raritan Bay in New Jersey
- Raritan Township (disambiguation)

== People ==
- Raritan people, a group of Lenape Indians

== Other ==
- Raritan (journal), a journal of Rutgers University
- Raritan Formation, a Mesozoic geologic formation
- Raritan Inc., a technology company in Somerset, New Jersey
- USS Raritan (multiple ships)
