= Coxsackie Declaration of Independence =

Coxsackie Declaration of Independence is a lesser-known declaration signed a year prior to the more famous Declaration of Independence.

It was reputedly signed at the Bronck House in Coxsackie, New York.

Sources:

- http://www.rootsweb.com/~nygreen2/the_coxsackie_declaration_of_independence.htm
