= Bronck Farm 13-Sided Barn =

Historic barn in Greene County, New York

- U.S. National Register of Historic Places
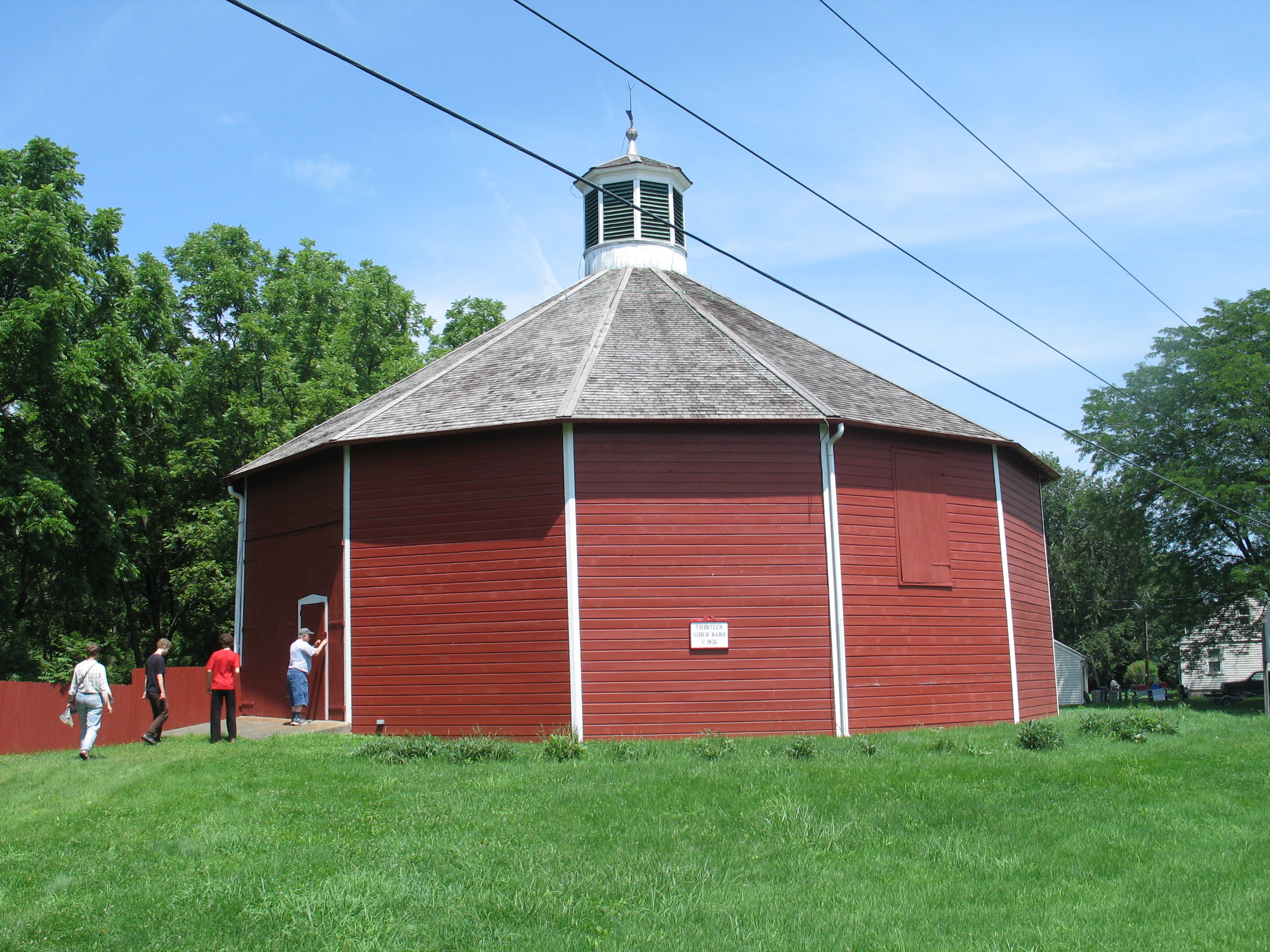
- Bronck Farm 13-Sided Barn, July 2009

- Location within New York Location within the United States
- Nearest city: Coxsackie, New York
- Coordinates: 42°20′46″N 73°50′42″W
- Area: less than one acre
- Built: 1832
- Architectural style: 13-sided
- MPS: Central Plan Dairy Barns of New York TR
- NRHP reference No.: 84002395
- Added to NRHP: September 29, 1984

Bronck Farm 13-Sided Barn is a historic barn located in the town of Coxsackie in Greene County, New York. It was built about 1832 and is a thirteen-sided timber-frame structure with a hipped roof surmounted by an octagonal cupola. The barn has an overall diameter of approximately 70 feet, and its one-story interior is open in plan. Although associated historically with the nearby Bronck House, the barn is listed separately on the National Register of Historic Places.

The barn meets the definition of a round barn, as its polygonal form closely approximates a circular plan.

It was listed on the National Register of Historic Places in 1984.

== History ==
The barn was constructed in the early nineteenth century during a period of agricultural experimentation in New York State. Polygonal and round barns were promoted at the time for their perceived efficiency, structural strength, and suitability for centralized dairy operations. The Bronck Farm barn is among the earliest surviving examples of this type in the region and reflects evolving ideas about farm design and livestock management in the Hudson Valley.

== Architecture ==
The Bronck Farm 13-Sided Barn is a wood-frame structure resting on a low foundation. Its thirteen-sided plan is uncommon, even among New York's surviving polygonal barns. The hipped roof is capped by an octagonal cupola, which provided ventilation and light to the interior. The interior space is open and undivided, a characteristic feature of central-plan barns intended to facilitate efficient movement and feeding of livestock.

== Significance ==
The barn is significant for its architectural design and for its association with early nineteenth-century agricultural innovation. It is an intact example of a central-plan dairy barn and contributes to the understanding of experimental farm building forms in New York State. The structure is included as part of the Multiple Property Submission Central Plan Dairy Barns of New York.

== Preservation ==
The Bronck Farm 13-Sided Barn remains a prominent historic agricultural structure in Greene County. Its listing on the National Register of Historic Places recognizes its architectural and historical importance and provides a framework for its preservation.
