= Van Tassel Sutphen =

American dramatist

William Gilbert van Tassel Sutphen
- Born: May 11, 1861; Philadelphia
- Died: 1945
- Occupations: Writer, editor

William Gilbert van Tassel Sutphen (1861–1945) was an American playwright, librettist, novelist, and editor, an authority and author of publications on golf, and, eventually, an Episcopalian minister.

Sutphen was born in Philadelphia on 11 May 1861. His parents were the Rev. Morris Crater Sutphen and Eleanor (Brush) Sutphen. He went to Princeton University and graduated in 1882.

Sutphen wrote several novels, the most famous of which was The Doomsman, a science fiction novel in the post-apocalyptic subgenre. The scholar Mike Davis has suggested that Sutphen "purloined" ideas and scenes for this book from an earlier post-apocalyptic novel, After London, by the English writer Richard Jeffries.

Sutphen was the first editor of Golf magazine, published by Harper Brothers. He also coined the term "the 19th hole". He gave the library at Princeton a collection of 75 books about golf.

Sutphen worked for many years as a reader and editor, for the publishers Harper Brothers, working on novels by Theodore Dreiser among others. At some point he became a brother-in-law of (the second) Joseph Harper. As a leading figure at Harpers, Sutphen attended Mark Twain's 70th birthday celebrations in New York.

== Other ==
In 1914, Sutphen was Chairman of the Publicity Committee of the New York Center of the Drama League. He was also a member of the Esperanto Society, and was listed in the New York Social Register.

== Works ==
- First Aid to the Injured: A Farce in One Act (1896)
- The Golficide and Other Tales of the Fair Green (1898)
- The Cardinal’s Rose: A Novel (1900)
- The Amateur and the Automobile (Saturday Evening Post, 11 May 1901, p 431 - 432)
- The Official Golf Guide for 1902 (edited and compiled)
- The Gates of Chance (1904)
- The Doomsman (1906)
- Narragansett Pier: An Original Comic Opera in Two Acts (1909)
- The Eve of Grace: A Cantata for Christmas and Epiphany Season (1914)
- In Jeopardy (1922)
- The Sutphen Family (1926)
- King’s Champion (1927)
- I, Nathanael, Knew Jesus (1941)
