= Dutchification =

Spread of the Dutch language, people or the culture of the Netherlands

Dutchification (Dutch: vernederlandsing) is the spread of the Dutch language, people or the culture of the Netherlands, either by force or cultural assimilation.

== History ==
=== Netherlands ===
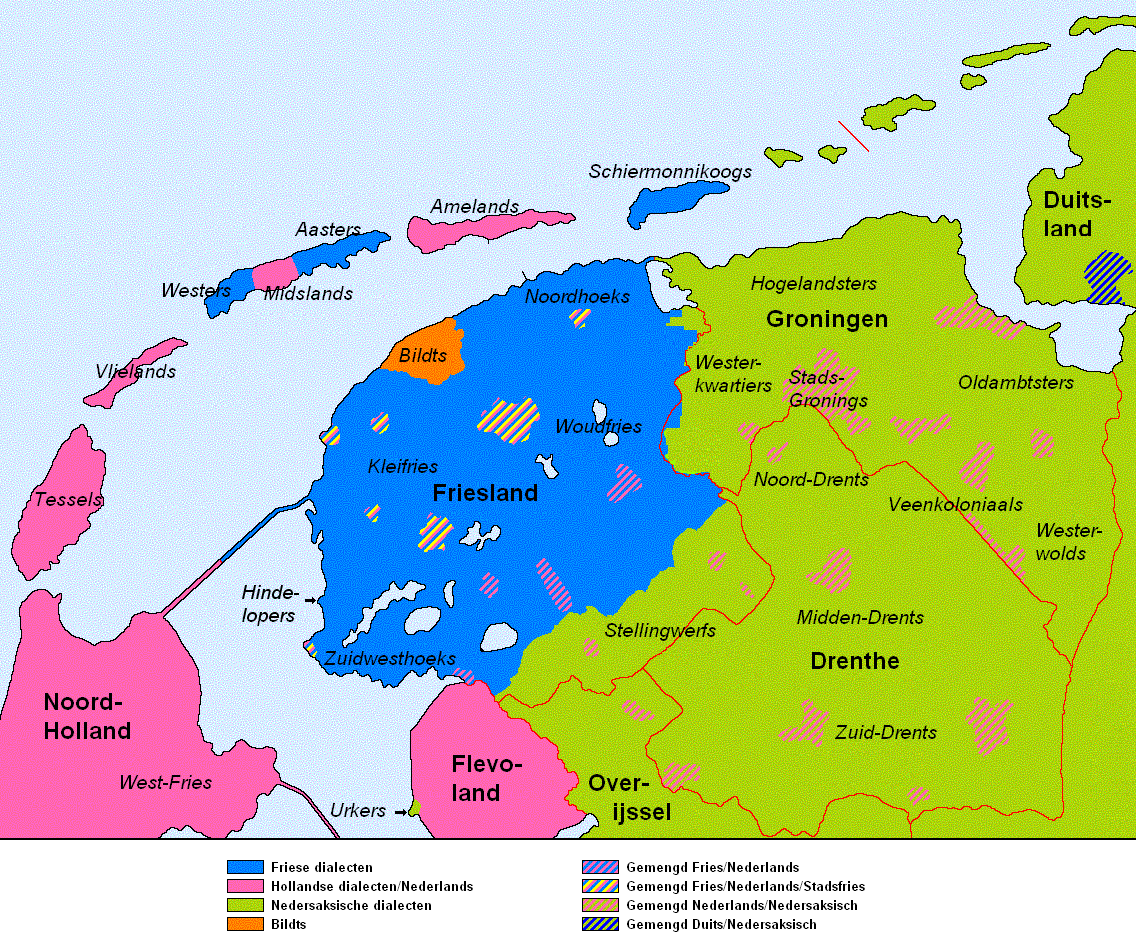
2007 linguistic situation in the Northern Netherlands

In the Netherlands, Dutchification focused on linguistic changes. There also were attempts to change cultural conventions on a smaller scale. Much of these efforts were focused on the Frisian region. During the Friso-Hollandic Wars (1256–1422), the County of Holland (where Low Franconian and later Middle Dutch was spoken) managed to conquer West Friesland; the region was slowly Dutchified thereafter. Meanwhile, the mercantile city of Groningen gradually spread its Dutch Low Saxon dialect across the East Frisian-speaking Ommelanden in the Late Middle Ages. By 1492, Groningen had expanded its area of control to most of the current province of Friesland with the help of the Vetkoper Frisian noblemen, at which point the Schieringer Frisian noblemen called in the help of Albert III, Duke of Saxony, who managed to drive out the Groningers and was appointed 'Gubernator of Frisia' by Habsburg Emperor Maximilian I in 1498. In the ensuing Guelders Wars, Habsburg general Georg Schenck van Toutenburg conquered Friesland in 1524 and became its first governor. The Dutch language gradually grew in administrative importance in the subsequent decades, and by the time Friesland joined the Dutch Republic in the 1580s, it had replaced Frisian as the language of law and government. The ever-increasing presence of Dutch-speaking officials in the Frisian urban areas heavily influenced everyday communication, and stimulated the emergence of the Stadsfries dialects. As a result, the West Frisian language assimilated various Dutch words, many of which are calques or loanwords from Dutch.

Between the 1950s and early 1980s, the percentage of inhabitants of Friesland using West Frisian as their home language dropped from 71% to 59%, primarily due to the migration of rural West Frisian speakers to the non-West Frisian urban areas and the settling of Dutch speakers from outside the province in the Frisian countryside. The West Frisian language itself gradually Dutchified as well.

A 2016 Radboud University Nijmegen study by linguist Geert Driessen showed that the percentage of West Frisian speakers steadily declined between 1994 and 2014 in favour of Dutch. During those twenty years, the number of West Frisian-speaking children within families decreased from 48% to 32%, and outside families (amongst their friends) from 44% to 22%. The percentage of parents talking West Frisian amongst themselves dropped from 58% to 35%. According to Driessen, 'in two generations, there won't be much left', as people will no longer be able to read and write in West Frisian. The Dutch language may hang on for a few generations longer than West Frisian, but Driessen expects 'everything to switch to English.'

=== Belgium ===
In Belgium, the Dutchification of education in Flanders was an essential part, arguably the most important, of the political objectives of the Flemish Movement, a social movement seeking acknowledgement of the Dutch speakers' language and culture. When Belgium was established in 1830, the francophone government oppressed the Dutch-speaking populace. The Dutch language was banned from secondary and higher education, politics, and justice in favour of French. Hence Dutchification in Belgium largely refers to the process of replacing French as the language of social mobility in Flanders.

=== New Netherland ===
In the toponymy of New Netherland, a 17th-century province in North America, Dutchification is seen in many place names based in Delaware languages.

For the concept of Dutchification in colonial North America, see:

- John M. Murrin, "English Rights as Ethnic Aggression: The English Conquest, the Charter of Liberties of 1683, ... suggests that "Batavianization" played as significant a role as "Anglicization" in early New York.

Also:

- Richard C. Simmons (1976): The American colonies: from settlement to independence
- Joyce D. Goodfriend (1994): Before the Melting Pot: Society and Culture in Colonial New York City, 1664-1730
- Jeremy Adelman, Stephen Aron (2001): Trading cultures: the worlds of Western merchants: essays on authority
- Ned C. Landsman: Crossroads of Empire: The Middle Colonies in British North America
- Amy Turner Bushnell (1995): Establishing exceptionalism: historiography and the colonial Americas

=== Indonesia ===
For more on Dutchification in the Dutch East Indies, see:

- Gerald H. Krausse (1988): Urban Society in Southeast Asia: Political and cultural issues

== See also ==
- Dutch language
- Dutch people
- Dutch culture
- Dutch diaspora
