= Sutphin =

Sutphin is a surname almost exclusively found in the United States. It is an Americanized form of the Dutch surname Zutphen or Van Zutphen, from the place-name Zutphen (used for residents), meaning "south fen".

Notable persons with the name include:

- Dudley Sutphin (1875–1926), American lawyer and tennis player
- William H. Sutphin (1887–1970), American politician
- Beverly Sutphin, character in John Waters' 1994 film Serial Mom

== See also ==
- Sutphin Boulevard, in the New York City borough of Queens
- Sutphen (surname)
