= Bronck House =

Historic house in New York, United States

Coordinates: 42.342052°N 73.848724°W

- Pieter Bronck House
- U.S. National Register of Historic Places
- U.S. National Historic Landmark
- New York State Register of Historic Places
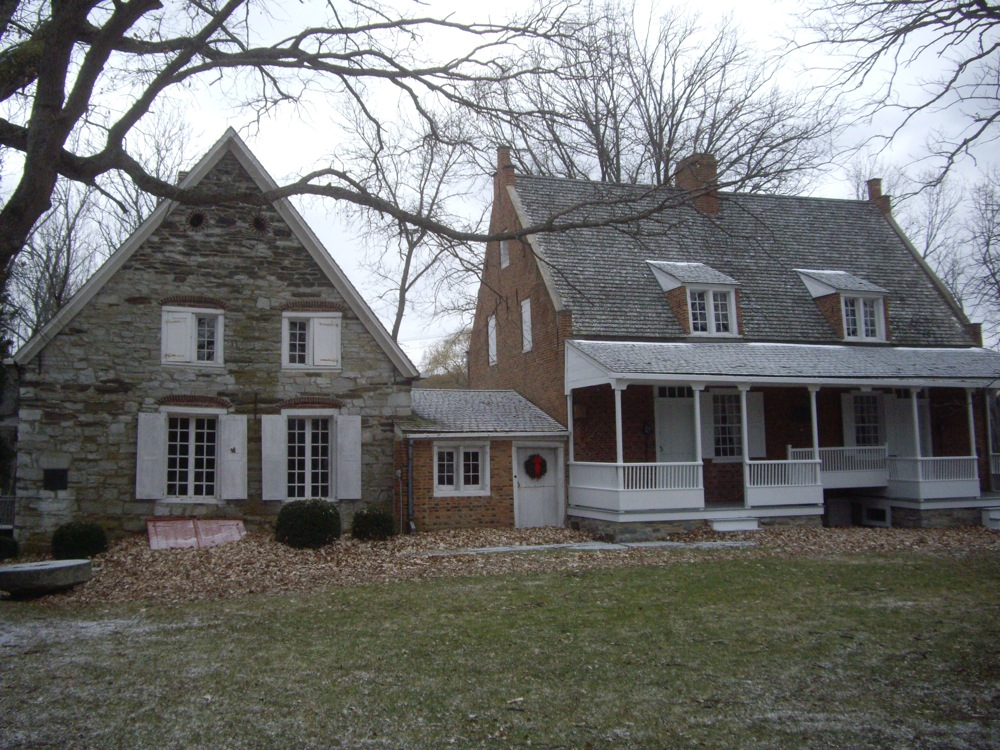
- Location: 90 County Highway 42, Coxsackie, New York
- Area: 16 acres (6.5 ha)
- Built: 1663
- Architectural style: Colonial
- NRHP reference No.: 67000012
- NYSRHP No.: 03905.000261

Significant dates
- Added to NRHP: December 24, 1967
- Designated NHL: December 24, 1967
- Designated NYSRHP: June 23, 1980

The Bronck House, also known as the Pieter Bronck House, is a historic house museum west of Coxsackie in Greene County, New York. With a construction history dating to 1663, it is believed to be the oldest surviving building in Upstate New York, and is a well-preserved example of early Dutch and Swedish Colonial architecture. It was declared a National Historic Landmark in 1967. It is now a museum property managed by the county historical society.

== Description and history ==
The Bronck House is located on Pieter Bronck Road, off US 9W, between the New York Thruway and the town of Coxsackie on the west side of the Hudson River. The house consists of a series of connected structures, oriented roughly north–south on the south side of Pieter Bronck Road east of Coxsackie Creek. The southernmost section is the oldest part: it is a single-pile structure with thick stone walls, with a steeply pitched gable roof. Its interior as built consisted of single open chambers on two floors, with a loft space in the attic. The interior has original and restored elements, including wide floor boards and doors with original hardware. This house was built about 1663 by Pieter Bronck, a native of Jönköping, Sweden who came here with his Dutch wife as part of the Dutch colonization of the Hudson River valley. Bronck was a relative of Jonas Bronck, for whom The Bronx is named.

In 1738, Leender Bronck, Pieter's grandson, built a larger brick house that was connected to the first house by a brick passageway. In 1792 the Broncks added a stone addition to the rear of the 1738 structure, using construction methods similar to that of the 1663 building. The house remained in the Bronck family until 1938. It now is owned and operated as a museum by the Greene County Historical Society. The Bronck Farm 13-Sided Barn is related to, but listed separately from the Bronck House. It was listed on the National Register of Historic Places in 1984. The house is reputed to be the location where the Coxsackie Declaration of Independence was signed, more than a year before the Continental Congress signing in 1776.

== See also ==
- List of the oldest buildings in New York
- List of National Historic Landmarks in New York
- National Register of Historic Places in Greene County, New York
