= Sutphin Boulevard =

Street in Queens, New York

- A "Welcome to Sutphin Boulevard" sign above Sutphin Boulevard and Archer Avenue
- Interactive map of Sutphin Boulevard
- Owner: City of New York
- Maintained by: NYCDOT
- Length: 2.6 mi (4.2 km)
- Location: Queens, New York
- Coordinates: 40.69011370029242°N 73.79686959169676°W
- South end: Rockaway Boulevard in South Jamaica
- North end: Hillside Avenue in Jamaica

Sutphin Boulevard is a major street in the New York City borough of Queens. The entirety of the boulevard runs through Jamaica.

== History ==
The boulevard is named after John H. Sutphin (1835–1907), a Queens County political figure and banker who lived in Jamaica. Sutphin served as Queens County clerk and chaired the Queens Democratic Committee for many years. The last name Sutphin is derived from the Dutch city of Zutphen.

The Queens Supreme Courthouse, located at 88-11 Sutphin Boulevard, was completed in 1936 as a Works Progress Administration project. Designed by architects Eccles and Knowles, the building was originally known as the Queens General Court and subsequently became home to several Queens County judicial offices.

== Route description ==
Sutphin Boulevard begins at Hillside Avenue and passes through Jamaica Center. Between Archer Avenue and 94th Avenue, Sutphin Boulevard goes under the tracks of the Long Island Rail Road at Jamaica station. It passes through the Jamaica and South Jamaica neighborhoods. Major intersections along the way include Liberty Avenue, Lakewood Avenue, Linden Boulevard and Foch Boulevard. Sutphin Boulevard ends at the intersection of Rockaway Boulevard and 150th Street; south of that intersection, 150th Street continues into John F. Kennedy International Airport.

== Transportation ==
Sutphin Boulevard passes by several New York City Subway stations named for it along the way, including:

- Sutphin Boulevard, on the IND Queens Boulevard Line at Hillside Avenue, serving the F and <F> train
- Sutphin Boulevard–Archer Avenue–JFK Airport, a station complex on the Archer Avenue lines, serving the E, J, and Z trains
- Sutphin Boulevard, the former BMT Jamaica Line elevated station at Jamaica Avenue; now demolished and replaced by the Archer Avenue station

Several bus routes run along Sutphin Boulevard in Jamaica:

- The Q20, Q44 SBS, Q1 and Q43 buses run on Sutphin Boulevard between Hillside and Archer Avenues.
- South from Jamaica Avenue, the Q6 goes to Rockaway Boulevard, the Q8 and Q9 head to Liberty Avenue, the Q41 runs to 94th Avenue (Howard Beach) or from 95th Avenue (165th Street Terminal), and the Q60 runs to Archer Avenue (Sutphin/Archer/JFK station), 108th Avenue (South Jamaica), or from 109th Avenue (Manhattan). All Q25 and Q65 buses also run to Archer Avenue and terminate, then continue to 95th Avenue for their opposite terminals.
- The Q40 runs between Lakewood and 88th Avenues, where it terminates.
- The Q7 serves the boulevard’s southern end, at which point it becomes 150th Street.
