= Danskammer Point Light =

- Location: New York, U.S.
- Coordinates: 41°34′22″N 73°57′53″W

Tower
- Constructed: 1885; 141 years ago
- Height: 31 feet (9.4 m)
- Markings: White wooden tower
- Fog signal: Bell struck every 20 seconds

Light
- Deactivated: 1920s

Danskammer Point Light was a lighthouse on Danskammer Point in the Town of Newburgh in New York, along the banks of the Hudson River. It was later demolished and is now the site of the Danskammer Generating Station.
