= Danskammer Generating Station =

Power Generation Station

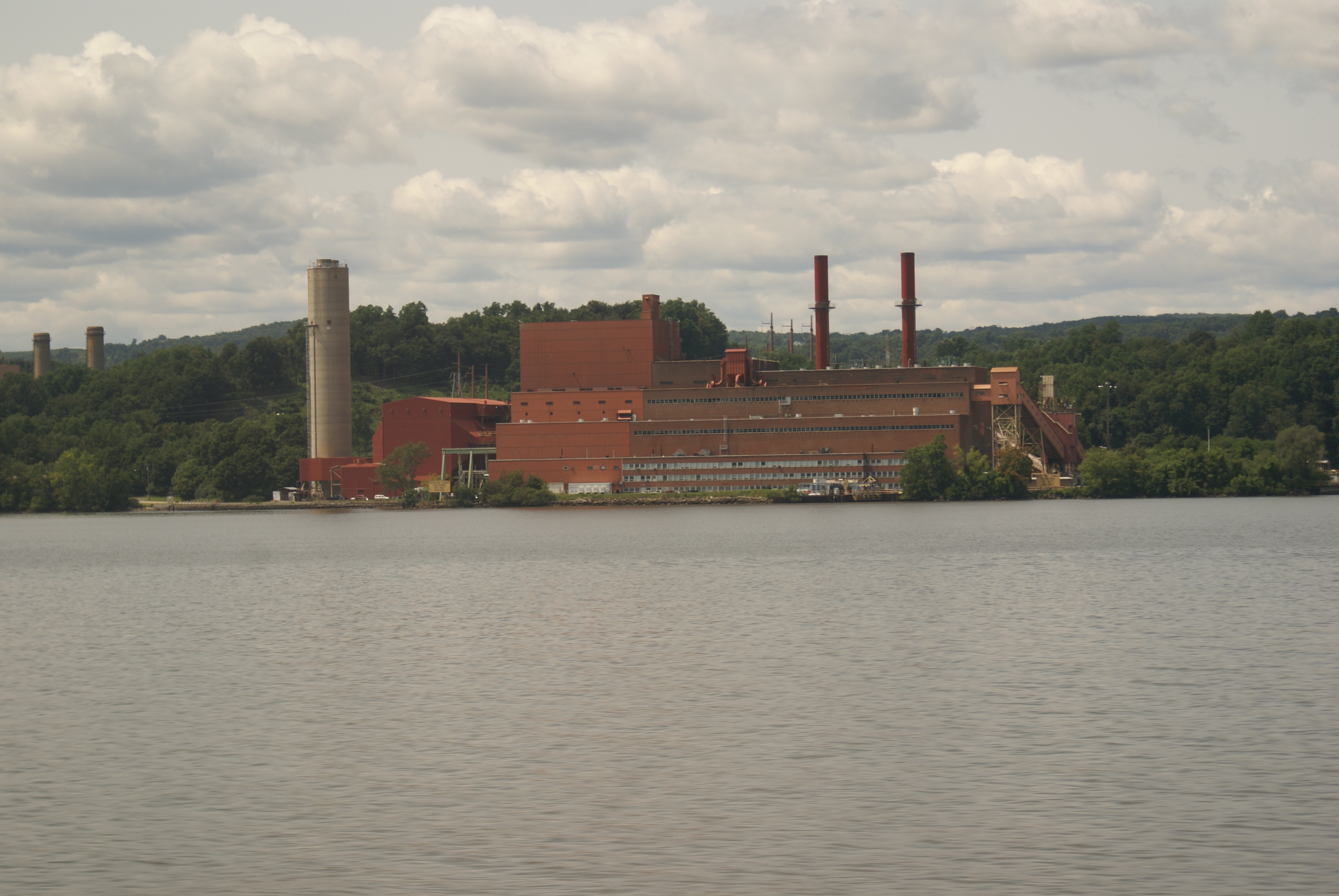
- A view of the Danskammer Generating Station in Newburgh, NY as seen from a train travelling on the other side of the Hudson River.
- Country: United States
- Location: Newburgh, NY
- Coordinates: 41°34′22″N 73°57′53″W
- Status: Operational
- Commission date: Unit 1 (RFO/gas): Dec. 1951; Unit 2 (RFO/gas): Sep. 1954; Unit 3 (coal/gas): Oct. 1959; Unit 4 (coal/gas): Sep. 1967; Units 5,6 (DFO): Jan. 1967 (decommissioned)
- Owners: Danskammer Energy, LLC

Thermal power station
- Primary fuel: Natural gas
- Cooling source: Hudson River

Power generation
- Nameplate capacity: 537 MWe (nameplate); 502 MWe (winter)

Danskammer Generating Station is located on the shore of the Hudson River in the Town of Newburgh, New York, United States, 0.5 miles (0.8 km) upstream of the larger oil-fired Roseton Generating Station. Danskammer 'units 1 and 2 burn natural gas as a primary fuel, and oil as a backup fuel (72 and 73.5 MWe nameplate capacity), whereas units 3 and 4 are exclusively fired with natural gas (147.1 and 239.4 MWe nameplate capacity).

The station was built by Central Hudson Gas & Electric in the 1950s, and sold to Dynegy in 2001 as part of electricity deregulation. The plant was severely flooded in the wake of Hurricane Sandy, and Dynegy sold the plant to Helios Power Capital, LLC in 2013. Helios in turn sold the plant to Mercuria Energy Group, who sold it to Tiger Infrastructure, a private equity firm based on 5th Avenue in New York City, and Agate Power. As of 2018, it is owned by Danskammer Energy, LLC. In 2018, Danskammer Energy filed an application with the New York State Public Service Commission to build a new, larger plant uphill of the current site that would be a more efficient combined cycle facility with an air cooled condenser to reduce water draw, and which would run as a baseload station (able to run all the time), rather than a peaker plant (running just a few hours per week).

The peaker plant has been the target of a prolonged environmental lawsuit over its cooling system. The proposed baseload plant has also garnered community protest.

== History ==
The name Danskammer is Dutch for "Dance chamber". On their voyage upriver in 1609 Henry Hudson's crew supposedly saw Native Americans dancing around a fire at the site and thought they were looking at "the Devil's dance chamber". There was once a lighthouse, Danskammer Point Light, at the site.

The Danskammer station was built by Central Hudson Gas & Electric and opened in 1952.

=== Sale to Dynegy ===
In 2001 Central Hudson sold both Roseton and Danskammer to Dynegy for $903 million, under new rules deregulating electricity, in order to become just a distributor of power. Central Hudson added a facility that allowed the plant, which had previously received coal only by rail, to receive coal from self-unloading ships.

=== Environmental concerns ===
Shortly after the Dynegy acquisition, environmental activists began to raise concerns about the plant's emissions. According to Environmental Protection Agency (EPA) figures, it was among the top ten releasers of pollutants by weight in New York, releasing 1.4 million pounds (640 tonnes) of hazardous emissions in 2000. Dynegy defended its operation of the plant as entirely within its permits.

The environmental group Riverkeeper took note of the long-overdue renewal of the plant's discharge permit from the state Department of Environmental Conservation (DEC). In common with Roseton and Indian Point Energy Center, its use of once-through cooling, in which river water was pumped in, used to cool the plant, then pumped out warm, dated to the 1950s and was responsible for large fish kills in the river. A state judge had voided the permit, but it was reversed on appeal. After DEC rebuffed Riverkeeper's effort to force it to accelerate the process, and ruled that closed-cycle cooling, the environmental group's preferred alternative, was not feasible at Danskammer, Riverkeeper filed suit against DEC and Dynegy alleging violations of state administrative-procedure law in issuing the new permit. They alleged that DEC had accepted Dynegy's argument that it didn't have space to install closed-cycle cooling despite the company owning large tracts of adjacent vacant land, and that it had allowed Dynegy to account for its water withdrawals in an unrealistic fashion. Dynegy says there are cheaper alternatives to the cooling towers a closed-cycle system would require.

=== Local taxation concerns ===
During the late 2000s, Dynegy filed a suit of its own against the local and county governments. It alleged that the plants had been overvalued and thus that it had paid more in taxes to Orange County, the town of Newburgh and the Marlboro school district than it should have. The exact reasons for the alleged overvaluation remained confidential as a result of a judge's gag order in the case in order to protect Dynegy's proprietary information regarding the plant. It was later settled, resulting in an increase in local property taxes, particularly in the school district. In 2019, Danskammer once again claimed that they had overpaid Marlboro School District over $900,000.

=== Dynegy bankruptcy, storm damage and plant sale ===
Dynegy filed for bankruptcy in 2011. In 2012 the Danskammer plant incurred extensive storm damage from Hurricane Sandy and was shut down. Pursuant to the bankruptcy declaration, Dynegy sold the Danskammer plant to Helios Power Capital, LLC in 2013. Both Danskammer and Roseton were sold for $68 million.

==== Danskammer Electric Energy Production (2006–2012, 2020) ====
Year	Net Energy Production (GWh)	Notes
2006	2,282	
2007	2,618	
2008	2,679	Units 1 and 2, which burn fuel oil primarily at this time, curtailed compared to previous years
2009	2,062	Units 1 and 2 again produce little energy
2010	1,734	Units 1 and 2 again produce little energy
2011	917	Units 1 and 2 again produce little energy
2012	308	Units 1 and 2 again produce little energy
2020	12.3	Most of the energy in 2020 was produced from Unit 4

=== New operating permits and plant restart ===
Following the 2013 acquisition, Helios Power Capital had planned to dismantle the Danskammer plant. However, the New York Independent System Operator was interested in stabilizing electric power prices in the Lower Hudson Valley region, and created a new electricity capacity zone to facilitate such stability. Helios then proposed to renovate and reopen the plant. After extensive consultations and negotiations on environmental permit requirements, DEC and EPA allowed Danskammer to reopen, using only natural gas as the primary fuel. Units 1 and 2 may use oil as a backup fuel. Units 1 through 4 were restarted in 2014. The plant continued to operate as a peaker unit, producing comparatively little energy compared to its theoretical maximum on an annual basis but collecting increased revenues in the NYISO capacity market as a result of the new FERC-approved capacity zone.

Mercuria Energy Group, which had brought Danskammer back online, agreed to sell it to a New York City private equity firm in 2017. Tiger Infrastructure partnered with Agate Energy to buy the plant. While the price was not made public, a filing with the state's Public Service Commission said that Mercuria was lending Tiger $66 million to cover part of the purchase. The parties expected to receive regulatory approval by the end of the year. However, their plans overlooked the lengthy public comments and Article 10 intervenor process, as well as community outrage at the scale of the proposed plant. To date, 7 local communities have passed resolutions to oppose the plant.

=== "Repowering" application ===
In 2018, the new owners, Danskammer Energy, LLC., filed an application for a Certificate of Environmental Compatibility and Public Need pursuant to Article 10 of the Public Service Law to re-power the plant as a more efficient 525 MW to 575 MW combined-cycle facility in the same footprint as the existing facility. This new facility would use an air cooled condenser to cool the water used in the steam turbine, eliminating the once-through cooling system disapproved by local environmental groups. Opponents to the application claim the new proposals systemically mischaracterize the nature of the plant as a "repowering", when it is in fact an expansion, with baseload capacity rising 100 MW to 636 MW; and assert that air emissions would be impacted.

In June 2026, Danskammer Energy filed for Chapter 11 bankruptcy protection. The filing revealed that the company owed $13 million to creditors, including nearly $12 million to New York Independent System Operator. New York Independent System Operator is requiring Danskammer to remain operational until at least August due to energy shortages.

== Impact on local tax revenues ==
Throughout the 1980s and 1990s, when Central Hudson owned the plant, Central Hudson's tax payments amounted to 80%-90% of the Marlboro School District's budget. From 2002 to 2007, Dynegy contributed about $100 million to the Marlboro School District budget, during which the school district planned capital expenditures upwards of $60 million. The plant's tax assessed value was updated in 2008 to account for decreasing wholesale market revenues and the school district began making budget and position cuts. In 2019, Danskammer LLC claimed they had overpaid $900,000 in taxes to Orange County and the district, and asked for an 5-year extension of their PILOT program to reduce taxes. The new expansion would also be eligible for an extended tax break as a PILOT.

== See also ==
- List of natural gas power stations
- List of power stations in New York
- New York energy law
