= Raritan Township =

Raritan Township may refer to:

- Raritan Township, Henderson County, Illinois
- Raritan Township, New Jersey
- Edison Township, New Jersey, originally incorporated as Raritan Township in 1870
- Hazlet, New Jersey, originally incorporated as Raritan Township in 1848
- Raritan Township, Barnes County, North Dakota
- Raritan Township, Day County, South Dakota, in Day County, South Dakota
