= Ann (disambiguation) =

Ann is a variant of Anne, a female given name.

Ann may also refer to:

== Places ==
- Ann, Missouri, historic town in the United States
- Ann, Myanmar, town in Rakhine State
- Ann (crater), on the Moon
- Ånn, village in Jämtland, Sweden
- Abbotts Ann, formerly Ann or Anna, village and parish in Hampshire, England
- Ann Township, Rakhine State of Myanmar
- Cape Ann, Massachusetts, United States
- Cape Ann (Enderby Land), Antarctica
- Little Ann, hamlet in Hampshire, England

== People with the surname ==
- Celeina Ann (born 1996), Japanese singer-songwriter
- Julia Ann (born 1969), American pornographic actress
- Karin Ann (born 2002), Slovak singer and songwriter
- Keren Ann (born 1974), singer-songwriter, composer, producer and engineer
- Kerri Ann, stage name of Kerrie Ann Keogh (born 1977), Irish pop singer
- Lisa Ann (born 1974), stage name of Lisa Ann Corpora, American pornographic actress
- Pam Ann, alter-ego of Australian comedian Caroline Reid
- Stevie Ann, stage name of Anna Stephanie Struijk (born 1986), Dutch singer-songwriter
- T. K. Ann (1912–2000), Hong Kong industrialist and sinologist
- Tina Ann, American singer

== Music ==
- Ann (singer), Taiwanese singer-songwriter
- "Ann", a song by Dave Berry and the Cruisers, 1966
- "Ann", a song by David Gates from First, 1973
- "Ann", a song by The Meters from their eponymous debut album, 1969
- "Ann" (The Stooges song), a song by The Stooges from The Stooges, 1969
- "Ann", a song by Val Doonican, 1970
- "Miss Ann," a song by Little Richard from the album Here's Little Richard, 1957

== Other uses ==
- Ann (ship), several ships
- Ann (film), a 2022 film about Ann Lovett
- List of storms named Ann
- ISO 639-3 language code for Obolo language (or Andoni language), in Nigeria

== See also ==
- ANN (disambiguation)
- Anna (disambiguation)
- Anne (disambiguation)
- Anni (disambiguation)
- Fort Ann (disambiguation)
- Lake Ann (disambiguation)
