= Announcement =

Announcement may refer to:

- "Announcement" (song), a 2008 song by Common
- Announcement (computing), a message about a new software version
- The Announcement (film), a 2018 comedy-drama film
- Campaign announcement, a type of political speech
- Public service announcement, a media message in the public interest
- Press release, a communication via news media
- "Announcement" (Andor)
