= ANN =

ANN may refer to:

== Media ==
- All Night Nippon, Japan
- All-Nippon News Network, Japan
- Arab News Network, exile Syrian
- Asia News Network, Asia
- Asianet News, India
- Anime News Network, online
- Adventist News Network, online

== Transportation ==
- Annan railway station, from its National Rail code
- Annette Island Airport, Alaska, US, from its IATA airport code

== Computing ==
- Announcement (computing)
- Artificial neural network

== Other uses ==
- Academy of Neonatal Nursing, US professional organization
- New Nation Alternative (Alternativa Nueva Nación), a former political coalition in Guatemala
- Ann Inc., US retail group, also with stock ticker symbol ANN
- Obolo language (ISO 639-3 language code ann)

== See also ==
- Ann (disambiguation)
