= Fort Ann =

Fort Ann may refer to:

== Canada ==
- Fort Anne, a fort built to protect the harbour of Annapolis Royal, Nova Scotia, Canada
  - Siege of Annapolis Royal (1744) or Siege at Fort Anne, in 1744

== United States ==
- Fort Ann, California, a former settlement in Amador County, California
- Fort Ann, a fort in Brevard County, Florida; see Timeline of Florida History § 1800–1845
- Fort Anne (Gloucester, Massachusetts), 1703 fort on the site of later Fort Defiance
- Fort Anne (Salem, Massachusetts), 1702 fort on the site of later Fort Pickering
- Fort Ann, New York, a town in Washington County, New York
  - Battle of Fort Anne, an American Revolutionary War battle of July 8, 1777, at Fort Anne, New York
  - Fort Ann (village), New York, a village in the Town of Fort Ann, New York
- Fort Amsterdam, New York City, named Fort Anne for part of its history
