= President's House (Ninth Street) =

House intended for the president on Ninth Street, Philadelphia

- The House intended for the President of the United States, in Ninth Street Philadelphia, by W. Birch & Son (1799)

General information
- Status: Demolished
- Architectural style: Federal
- Location: Ninth Street, between Market Street and Chestnut Street, Philadelphia
- Coordinates: 39°57′03″N 75°09′20″W
- Construction started: May 10, 1792 Cornerstone
- Completed: 1797
- Demolished: 1829

Design and construction
- Architect: William Williams

Renovating team
- Architect: Benjamin Henry Latrobe

President's House (Ninth Street) was a mansion built in Philadelphia to house the President of the United States. Philadelphia served as the temporary national capital, 1790-1800, while what is now Washington, D.C. was under construction. The Government of Pennsylvania built the house between 1792 and 1797 as part of an unsuccessful effort to persuade the federal government to abandon the District of Columbia, and make Philadelphia the permanent capital of the United States. The house was located on the west side of Ninth Street between Market and Chestnut Streets.

No president ever occupied the Ninth Street house. From November 1790 to March 1797, George Washington occupied a house on Market Street (then High Street), near the southeast corner with Sixth Street. John Adams occupied that same house from March 1797 to Summer 1800. Then Adams was the first occupant of the not-yet-finished White House in November 1800, but he lost the 1800 presidential election to Thomas Jefferson that same month.

In 1800, the Ninth Street house was purchased at public auction by the University of Pennsylvania, and became the centerpiece of a new, expanded campus. The university demolished the house in 1829 and replaced it with two new buildings.

== Background ==
Following ratification of the constitution, the national capital of the United States was in New York City. On July 16, 1790, Congress passed the Residence Act (1 Stat. 130), which designated Philadelphia the temporary capital for a 10-year period while the permanent capital at Washington, D.C., was constructed. The recently built Congress Hall was used from December 6, 1790, to May 14, 1800. The president of the United States, first George Washington and then John Adams, resided at the house leased from financier Robert Morris, also known as the President's House, on Market Street, between Fifth and Sixth Streets.

== History ==
In September 1791, the state government enacted the "Federal Building Bill" to pay for the renovations needed for the federal government office space and for the construction of a new executive mansion. Twelve lots were purchased on the west side of Ninth Street, between Market Street, then named High Street, and Chestnut Street. The property measured 202 by 151 feet (62 m × 46 m). The cornerstone, inscribed "House to accommodate the President of the United States", was laid on May 10, 1792, in a ceremony attended by Governor Thomas Mifflin. The mansion was completed in the spring of 1797 and cost more than $110,000. On March 3, 1797, Governor Mifflin offered the nearly completed mansion to John Adams on the eve of his inauguration. However, Adams rejected the offer on constitutional grounds: "as I entertain great doubts whether, by a candid construction of the Constitution of the United States, I am at liberty to accept it without the intention and authority of Congress". Thus neither Washington, no longer president when the mansion was ready, nor Adams, would reside in the President's House.

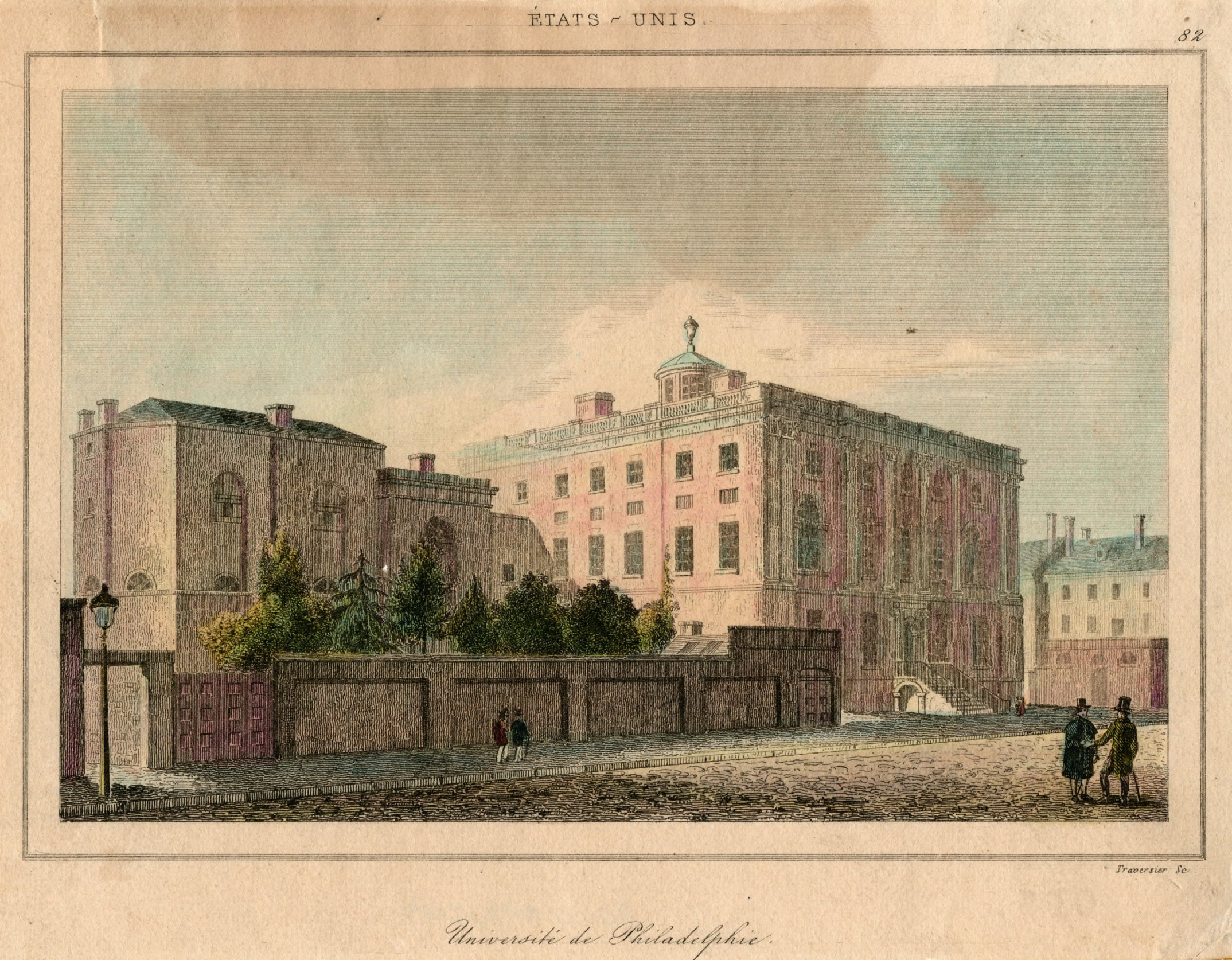
Engraving of the early campus of the University of Pennsylvania (c.1815). At left, is the first medical school building.

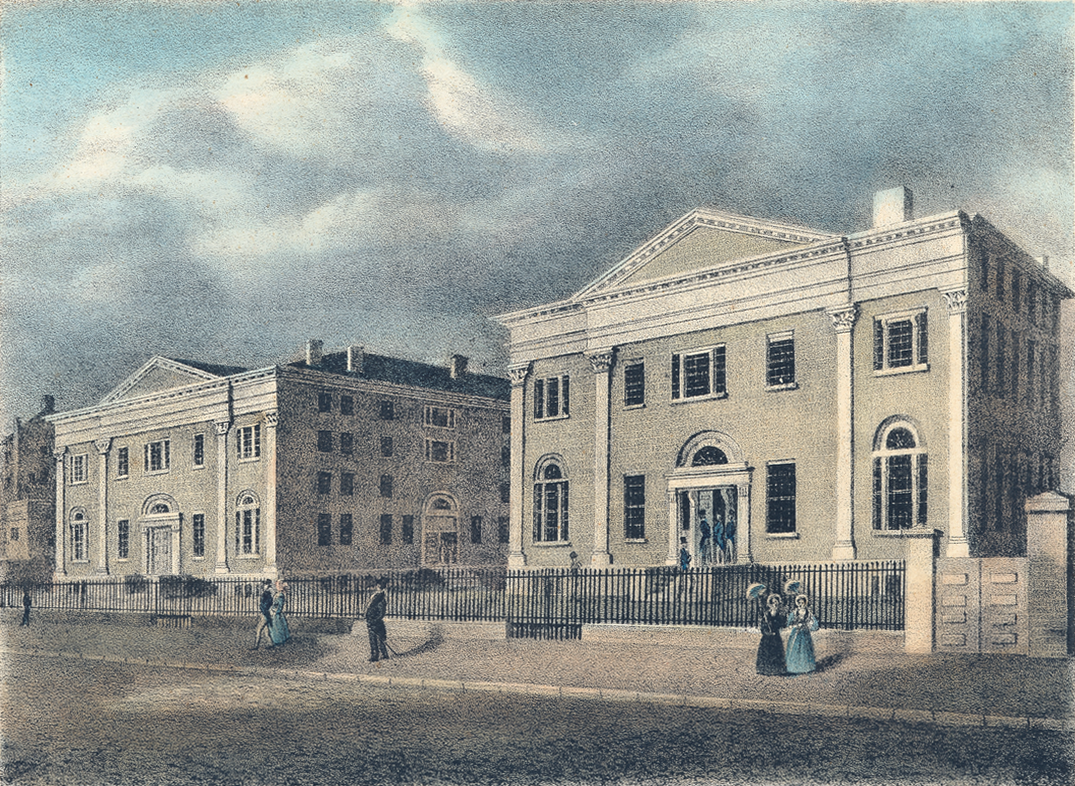
Engraving of the new Medical School (left) and College Hall (1842). Pilasters and other architectural elements of the Ninth Street House were reused for these buildings.

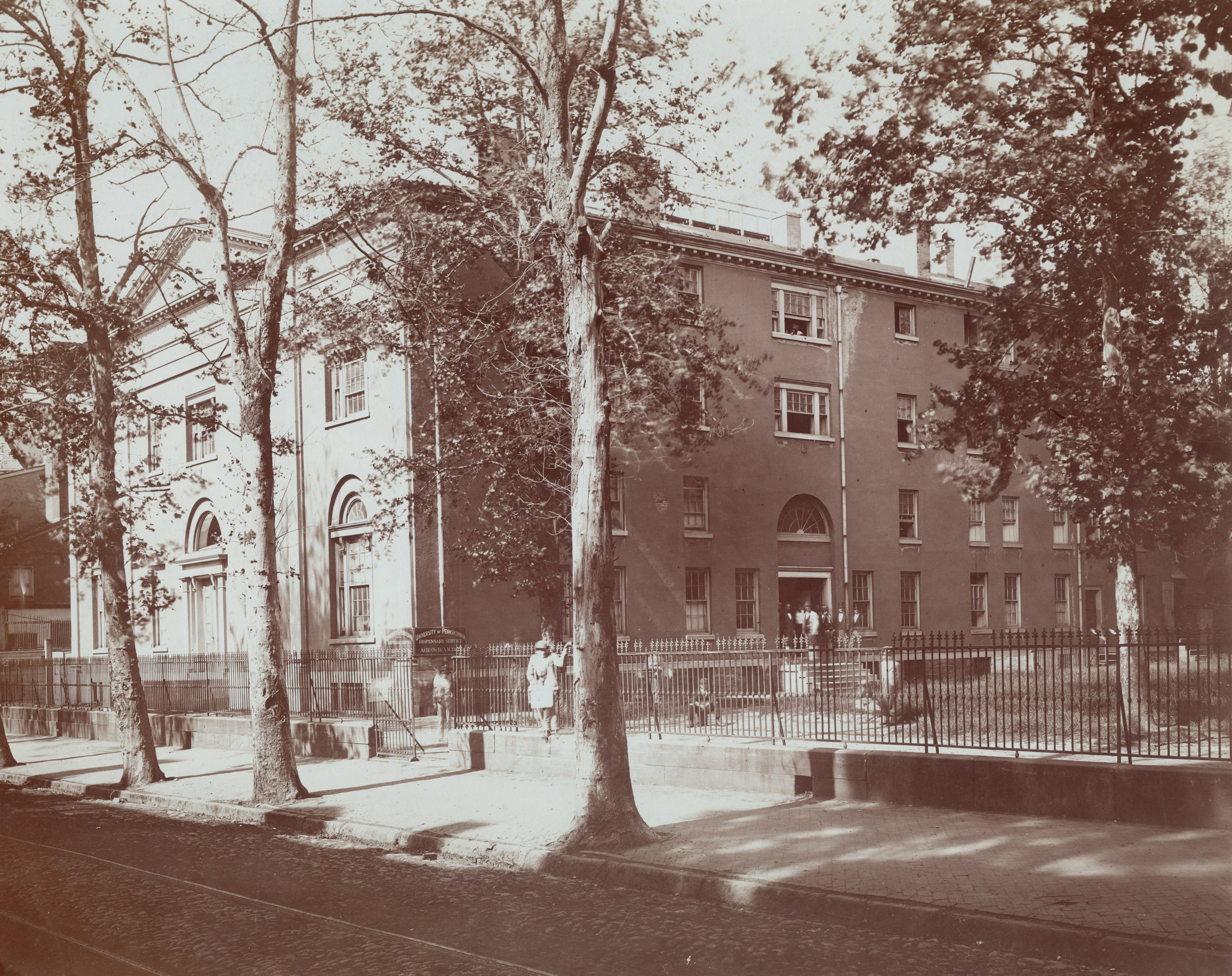
Medical School in 1872, the year Penn's campus moved to West Philadelphia

On July 15, 1800, the University of Pennsylvania bought the property, the mansion, and twelve lots, at public auction for $41,650. Classes started at this new campus in the spring of 1802. This Ninth Street campus was the university's second one. The property was renovated for the university by architect Benjamin Henry Latrobe. The Philomathean Society was organized in 1813 and had a room in the President's House. The mansion was demolished in 1829 to make room for two new university buildings, designed by architect William Strickland.

== Description ==
In 1790, Governor Mifflin had originally asked Pierre Charles L'Enfant, who was planning the new federal city, Washington, D.C., for a design. The house was eventually designed and built by master builder William Williams (1749–1794). The resulting three-story house was built of brick trimmed with marble and featured a facade in the neoclassical style of British architect Robert Adam. It had a hip roof with a central glass dome and cupola, topped by an eagle sculpture.

== Artistic depictions ==
In 1799, W. Birch & Son, artists William Birch and his son Thomas Birch, created the print entitled The House intended for the President of the United States, in Ninth Street Philadelphia, which depicted the house. It was plate 13 in Birch's Views of Philadelphia, published in 1800. In 1940, the Presidential Mansion was illustrated on commemorative Wedgwood china cups for the bicentennial of the University of Pennsylvania.

== See also ==
- Samuel Osgood House – First presidential mansion, used 1789–1790
- Alexander Macomb House – Second, 1790
- Government House (New York City) – House intended for the President, built 1790
- President's House (Philadelphia) – Third, 1790–1800
- White House – Fourth and current, since 1800

== Bibliography ==
- Kurjack, Dennis C. (October 1953). "The "President's House" in Philadelphia". Pennsylvania History: A Journal of Mid-Atlantic Studies. 20 (4). Pennsylvania Historical Association: 380–394. JSTOR 27769454. "The full story of the "President's House" that never housed a President"
- Lawler, Edward (2002). "The President's House in Philadelphia: The Rediscovery of a Lost Landmark". The Pennsylvania Magazine of History and Biography. 126 (1). University of Pennsylvania Press: 5–95. JSTOR 20093505. "For more than 150 years there has been confusion about the President's House in Philadelphia"
- Stillman, Damie (October 2005). "Six Houses for the President". Pennsylvania Magazine of History and Biography. 129 (4). University of Pennsylvania Press: 411–431. JSTOR 20093818.
