= Fort Amsterdam =

Colonial fort on Manhattan, New York (1625–1788)

Coordinates: 40.7042°N 74.0137°W

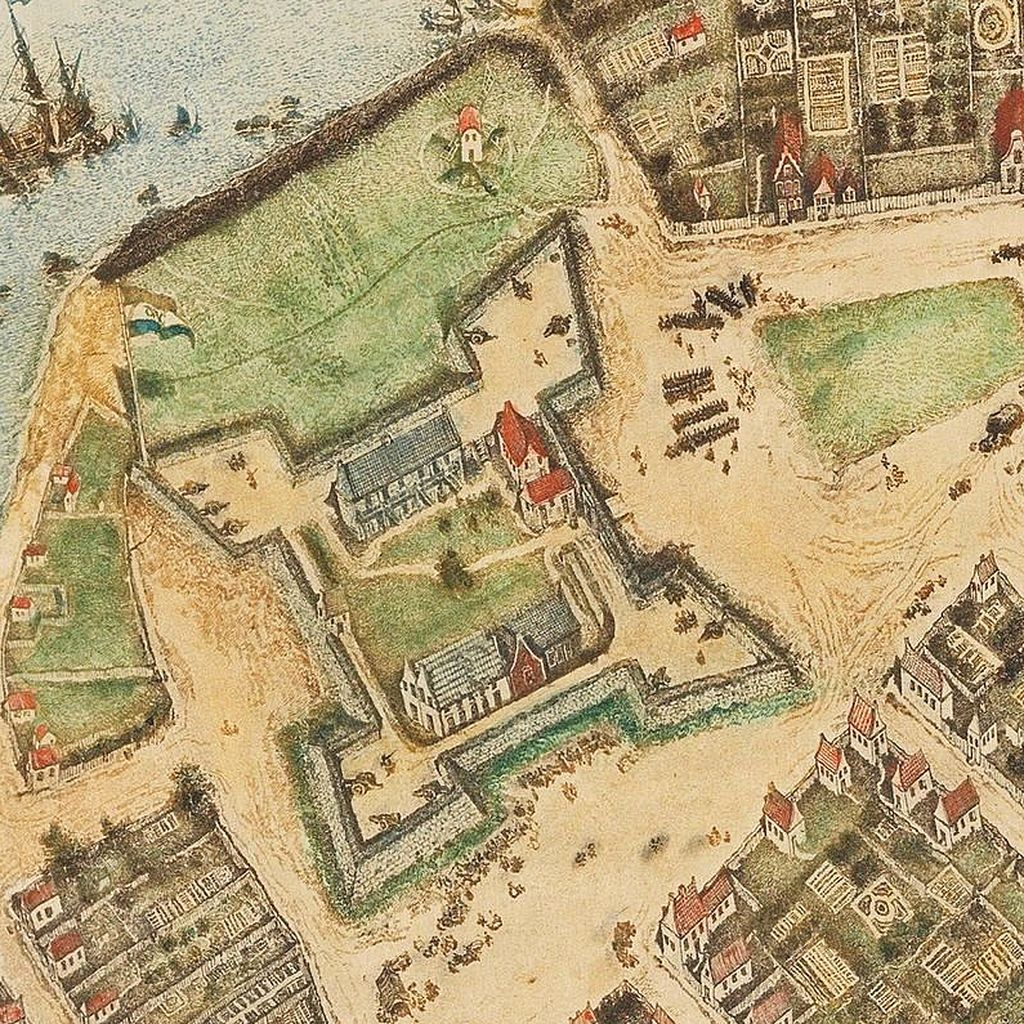
- Fort Amsterdam in 1660

Site history
- Built: 1625
- In use: 1626–1788
- Materials: Earthworks, stone
- Fate: After 165 years of service, the aging fort was leveled and replaced with the Government House.
- Battles/wars: Second Anglo-Dutch War; Third Anglo-Dutch War; Leisler's Rebellion; American Revolution

Fort Amsterdam (later Fort George, among other names) was a fortification on the southern tip of Manhattan Island at the confluence of the Hudson and East rivers in what is now New York City. The fort and the island were the center of trade and the administrative headquarters for the Dutch rule of the colony of New Netherland and thereafter British rule of the Province of New York. The fort was the nucleus of the settlement on the island which was at first named New Amsterdam and is central to New York's early history.

Before the fort was constructed, it was the scene where the purchase of Manhattan Island occurred. In its subsequent history, the fort was known under various names such as Fort James, Fort Willem Hendrick and its anglicized Fort William Henry, Fort Anne, and Fort George. The fort changed hands eight times in various battles, the first episode involving Dutch Governor Peter Stuyvesant, who surrendered the fort to Richard Nicolls of England in 1664. In the 18th century, the fort was at the center of the Stamp Act riots in New York when it was used to store shipments of stamped paper brought over from England, while serving as a safe haven for a number of stamp tax collectors. During the American Revolution, it was involved in the Battle of Brooklyn, when volleys were exchanged between the fort and British emplacements on Governor's Island. After 165 years of service, involving a number of conflicts, the fort was finally torn down in 1790 after the American Revolution. After the fort's demolition, the Government House was constructed on the site as a possible house for the United States President. The site is now occupied by the Alexander Hamilton U.S. Custom House, which houses a branch of the National Museum of the American Indian; Bowling Green is nearby.

The construction of the fort marked the official founding date of New York City as recognized by its seal. In October 1683, what would become the first session of the New York legislature convened at the fort. Artillery guns outside the fort overlooking the harbor formed a battery that would later be the namesake of nearby Battery Park.

== History ==
Starting with the founding and establishment of Fort Amsterdam in 1626, the fort, with its strategic location, overlooking the harbor and the mouth of the Hudson River, (Note: In early colonial days the Hudson River was referred to as the North River, and the Delaware River, referred to as the South River.) and as a lucrative trade center, played a significant role in the history that followed, all the way through the American Revolution, frequently changing hands between the Dutch, British and the Americans, with corresponding changes in the fort's name.

=== Establishment (1621–1660) ===
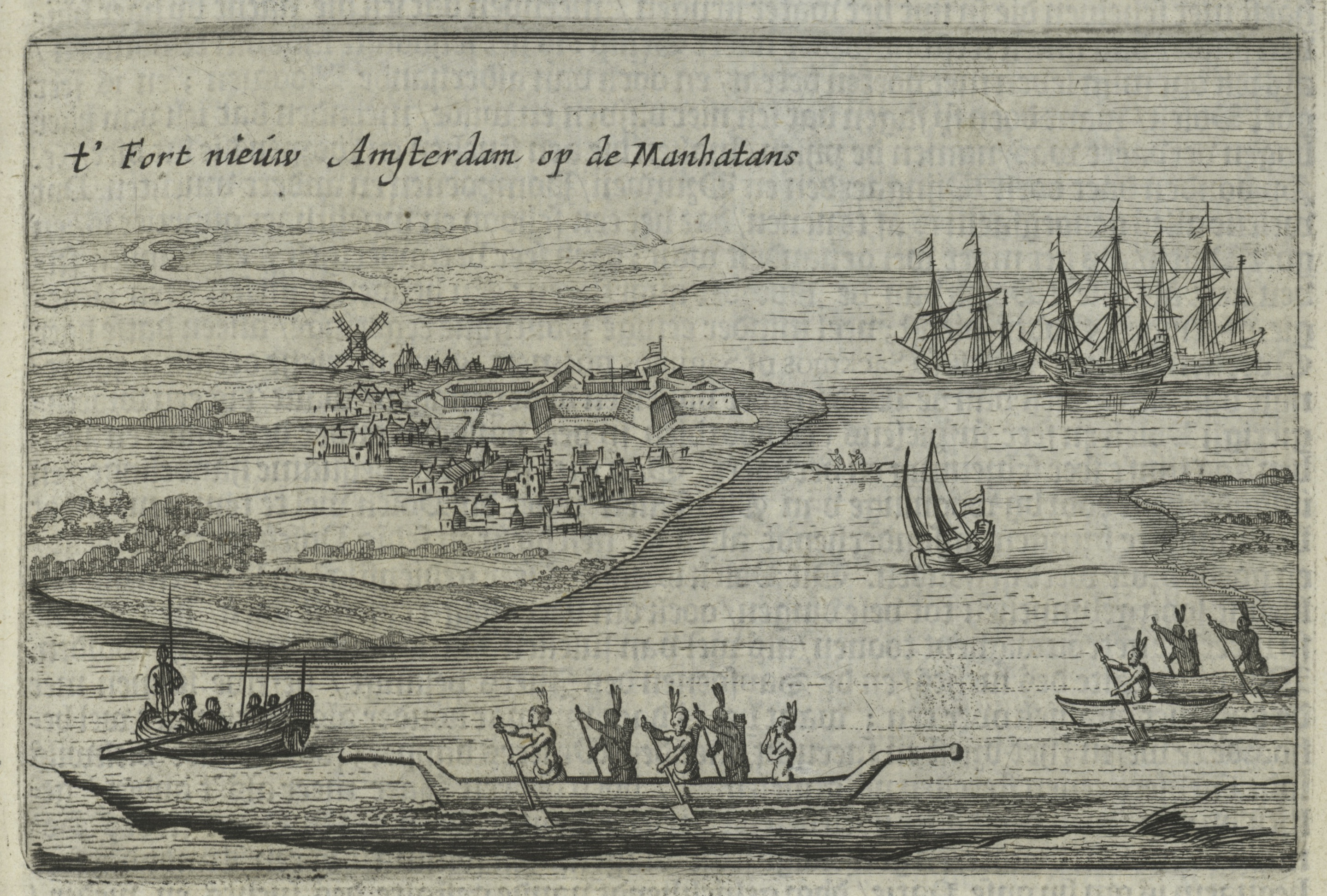
Fort Amsterdam on Manhattan in 1626

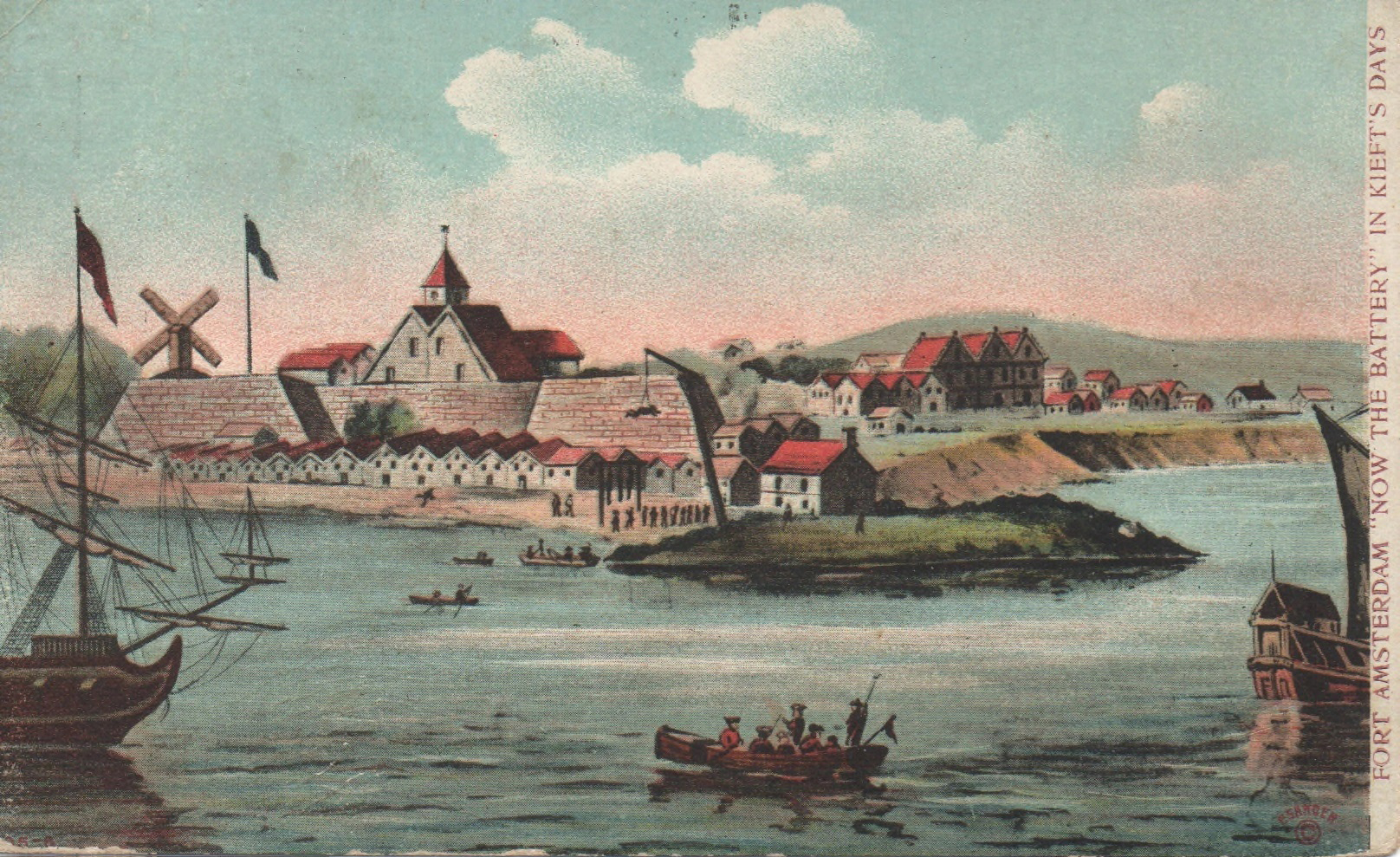
Fort Amsterdam Now the Battery in Kieft’s Days (1637)

Fort Amsterdam on Manhattan Island, and the greater Dutch colony of New Netherland, was chartered by the Dutch West India Company in 1621. Before Fort Amsterdam was constructed, the Dutch settlers erected a large stone building on the future location of the fort that served as a meeting house. It was surrounded by some 30 makeshift dwellings made from timber and bark, as finished building materials were scarce. The structures were surrounded by red cedar palisades which served as a temporary fort. Manhattan Island at this time was covered by woods and brush, with several marshes about the shore line, and at night the sound of bears and other wildlife could be heard. (Note: Variations of the name Manhattan, i.e. "Manahatin" or "Manatoes," have been found on old English and Spanish maps respectively. Henry Hudson referred to the inhabitants of the nameless island as the Manhattans, and subsequently the Island was named Manhattan by the Dutch.)

During the 17th century, no settlement was secure without a fortification for defense and refuge. Historian Maud Wilder Goodwin maintains the fort existed not so much out of concern for the Indians, but over other ambitious and enterprising Europeans. Historian John Andrew Doyle, however, maintains that the fort, with its earthen walls, was intended more for a defense against Indians and was almost useless as a defense against a professional army or navy at that time. In 1625, after much deliberation, it was decided that the best location for the fort would be at the southern tip of Manhattan Island, with the idea that it would be able to defend against any ship attempting to ascend the Hudson River. (Note: In reality, the fort at first was not much of a defense, with its crumbling earthen walls, and few guns.) The fort was designed by Kryn Fredericksen, (Note: Also spelled as 'Fredericksz') deputy and chief engineer of the New Netherland colony. Seventeenth-century Dutch forts all followed a similar design. Probably originally intended as a standard star-shaped fort, Fort Amsterdam had four sides with a bastion at each corner to better protect the walls. The original plan was to face the wall with stone, but this was never accomplished. The fort was built of hard-packed earth or rubble because earthworks would absorb the shock of cannon fire without collapsing, as stone walls might. Fredericksen had instructions to employ the help of nearby Indians in the fort's construction. and were never taken into slavery.

Under the direction of the Dutch West India Company, the first appearance of negro slaves in New Amsterdam occurred in 1626, and were used helping in the construction of the fort, clearing land, farming and other such work. Attitudes about slavery varied among the colonists. Some of the slaves were converted to Christianity, and later some of them were given their freedom and grants of land.

The fort became the nucleus of the New Amsterdam settlement and its mission was protecting New Netherland colony operations in the Hudson River against attack from the English and the French. Although its main function was military, it also served as the center of trading activity. It contained a barracks, a church, a house for the West India Company director, and a warehouse for the storage of company goods.

Directors of New Netherland
- Cornelius J. Mey—1624-1625
- Willem Verhulst—1625-1626
- Peter Minuit—1626-1632
- Sebastiaen J. Krol—1632-1633
- Wouter van Twiller—1633-1638
- Willem Kieft—1638-1647
- Peter Stuyvesant—1647-1664

The company appointed Cornelius Jacobsen Mey in 1624 as the first (provisional) director of the New Netherland colony, and who was stationed at New Amsterdam at the fort, serving until 1625.

Mey was soon replaced by Willem Verhulst, who arrived in January 1625. Verhulst served as the second director in 1625–1626. His term as director was marked with harsh and inconsistent punishment which infuriated the settlers. Realizing that food staples were in short supply in the newly developed settlement, the Dutch West India Company had shipped over some cattle, various live stock, seeds and farming equipment. The animals were initially kept on Governor's Island but the grazing proved inadequate so they were moved to a more fertile location on upper Manhattan Island.

At the time, Manhattan was sparsely settled, as most of the Dutch West India Company operations were upriver along the Hudson in order to conduct trading operation for beaver pelts. According to John Romeyn Brodhead, while the fort was under construction, three Wechquaesgeek people traveled south from the area of present-day Westchester County to barter beaver skins. When they reached the Kolck, a pond near what is now Chinatown, they were set upon by three farmhands, and one of the two adults was killed. When the young boy who was with them grew older, he took his revenge for the murder of his uncle, which act served as a pretext for Kieft's War.

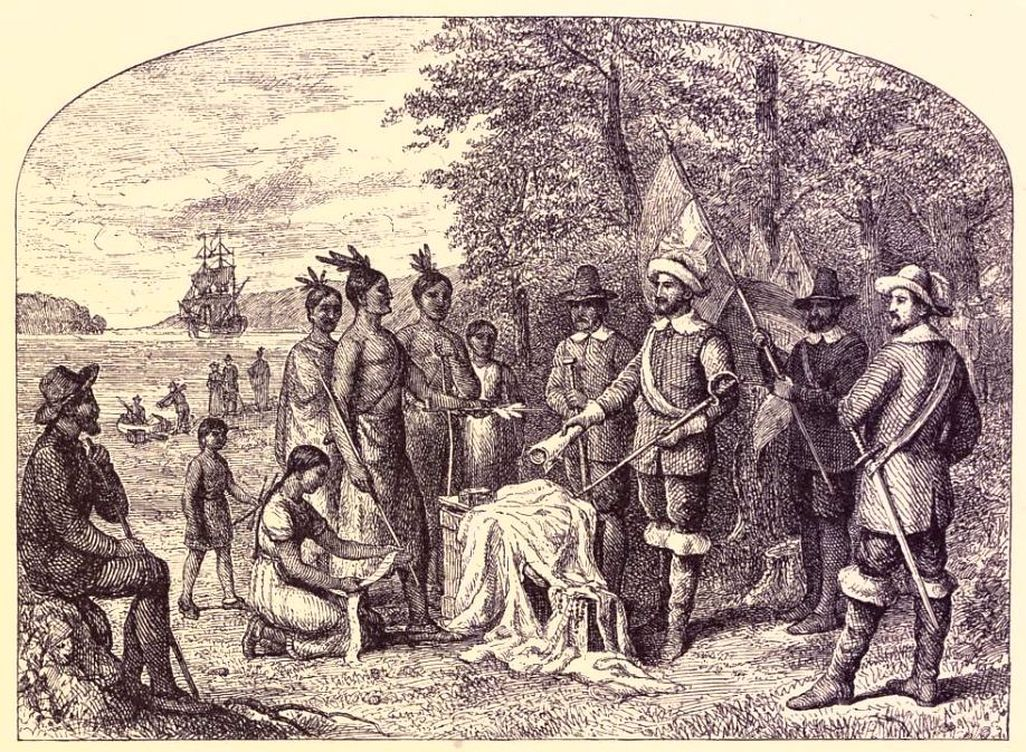
Illustration of Minuit and the purchase of Manhattan Island

At the direction of the Dutch West India Company, Verhulst was replaced as governor by the appointment of Peter Minuit, who arrived in 1625 and was appointed governor the following year. Minuit's first official task was to arrange a meeting with the local Indian chiefs and negotiate the purchase of Manhattan Island before any settlement and the erection of the fort was to occur. The meeting took place on 26 May 1626, on the rocky southernmost shore of the island, where a trade deal was made, which was gladly accepted by the Indians. Minuit promptly organized the first government of the colony, and was granted authority over its executive, legislative, and judicial functions. He also appointed a sheriff and a five-member advisory council, chosen from the most reputable men at the colony. On 27 July 1626, the Dutch ship, Arms of Amsterdam, arrived at Manhattan, commanded by captain Adriaen Joris, who in 1623 accompanied Captain May, and was left in charge of the colony at Fort Orange. By September 26, the Arms of Amsterdam, with a cargo containing thousands of fur pelts, samples of grain, and a load of hardwood, departed for Holland with news of the purchase of Manhattan and the successful establishment of the new colony. By 1628, the population of Manhattan Island, including men, women and children, was 270.

In 1632, Minuit was replaced by Sebastiaen Jansen Krol who briefly served as director for a period of thirteen months. His replacement, Wouter van Twiller, (Note: Van Twiller served as Director from 1633 to 1638. He was considered good natured but narrow-minded and ill qualified in the ways of government.) a clerk in the Dutch West India Company, who arrived at the fort, still under construction, aboard the Dutch ship, De Zoutberg along with a company of one hundred and four soldiers from Holland, the first military force to arrive at the colony, with Van Twiller officially as its first military head Also aboard was the Reverend Everardus Bogardus. Relations with neighboring English colonies were uncertain, as they were competing with the Dutch over trade with the Indians, prompting Twiller to strengthen the fort with stone at several locations. The fort was completed in 1635. He had built within the fort a guard-house and a small house for the soldiers. Outside the fort he built New Netherland's first church, complete with a house and stable, a bakery, a goat-stable, and a large storage shed to accommodate the ship builders.

Twiller, however, was generally disliked by the Dutch settlers. His financial management and accounting were poorly conducted and he neglected to report regularly to Amsterdam and had acquired a reputation for drunkenness. For this he was sharply and openly criticized by Borgardus from the pulpit and by the company's treasurer, Lubbertus Van Dincklagen, for which Twiller dismissed him and sent him back to Holland. Van Dincklagen immediately drew up a formal complaint and submitted it to the States General. After confirmed reports of Twiller's performance reached Holland it was decided that he be replaced as Director General of New Netherland. William Kieft (Note: Kieft served as Director from 1638 to 1647.) was subsequently appointed as the new Director in September 1637, arriving at New Amsterdam in March of the following year, effectively replacing Twiller.

Conditions in and about the fort by 1638 had deteriorated and were not promising, with incompetent governmental management contributing to a decline in trade, and making the prospect of farming bleak. Director Kieft upon inspection of the fort and surrounding area, found the fort in a ruinous condition, with its dilapidated walls which allowed the fort to be entered without difficulty from various points. All the carriages that mounted the cannons had fallen into decay, while the farms in the area had become neglected.

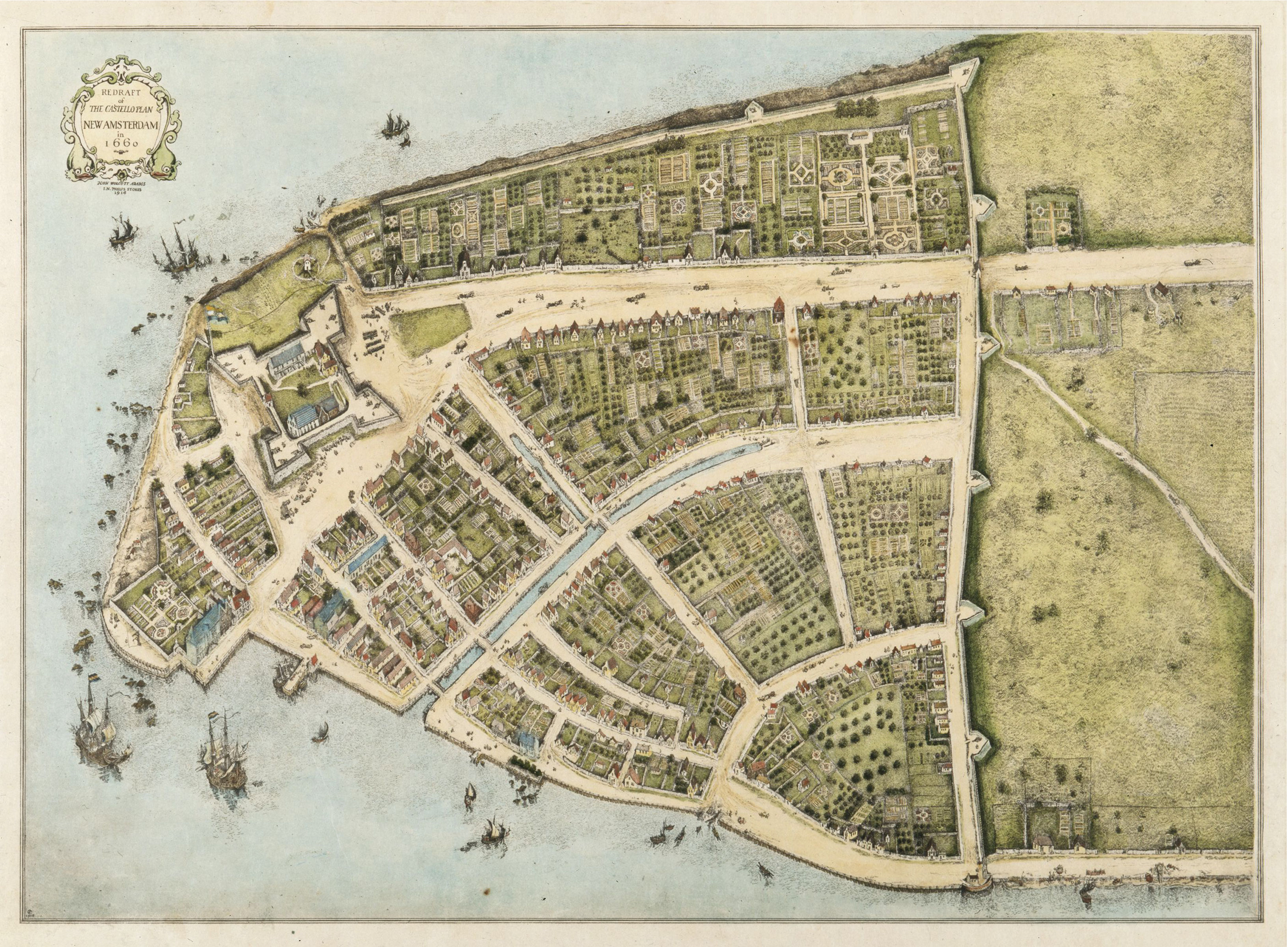
Manhattan in 1660, based on the Castello Plan, with the fort on the left

About 1640 conflicts with the Indians, who were robbing and murdering settlers for their fur and other goods, had increased into war. The garrison at Fort Amsterdam in 1643 consisted of only fifty to sixty soldiers, who were lacking in discipline and were often disorderly. The situation prompted Kieft to establish a code of military law for members of the garrison while on duty, which included stiff fines for blasphemy, slandering, intoxication or failure to appear for duty. The code was read aloud by a corporal every time the soldiers appeared for duty. After four years of fighting with the Indians a peace was finally reestablished in 1645. Under Kieft, however, public revenues overall were not forthcoming, smuggling was frequent and severely compromising legitimate trade, discontent and disorder was prevalent throughout the community, while protests and appeals for reform had no effect in getting Kieft and his subordinates to address the situation effectively. Subsequently, when Peter Stuyvesant arrived at Fort Amsterdam in 1647 he was joyfully received. He was accompanied by Reverend Johannes Backerus, who was to replace Bogardus.

Johannes Megapolensis, a minister of the Calvinist Dutch Reformed Church, arrived at Fort Amsterdam from Rensselaerswyck Manor in 1664 after serving there for six years. His arrival at Fort Amsterdam was subsequent to his assisting French missionary, Isaac Jogues, in his escape from the Mohawks. Jogues became the first Catholic priest to set foot on Manhattan Island. While at the fort, Jogues observed and wrote an account of the condition of the fort, its repairs, and the activity on Manhattan, noting the various religions and languages spoken. (Note: Jogues' account of the fort and Manhattan have been incorporated in the official records of the state of New York.) As the population of Manhattan was increasing the West India Company sent out another minister, Domine Samuel Drisius, to assist Megapolensis who had served the Dutch congregation in England and could preach in Dutch, English and French. At the insistence of Stuyvesant, and with children in need of baptism and religious instruction, Megapolensis was persuaded to remain in Manhattan.

As the population of the colony grew, there was a corresponding increase in the number of soldiers, and by 1650 the number of soldiers in New Netherland was roughly 250. By 1660, the population is estimated to have been around five-hundred, and by 1664 had grown to fifteen-hundred. That same year, Jacques Cortelyou was commissioned to conduct a survey and make a second map of New Amsterdam, which now had approximately three-hundred and fifty dwellings.

=== English rule (1664–1673) ===
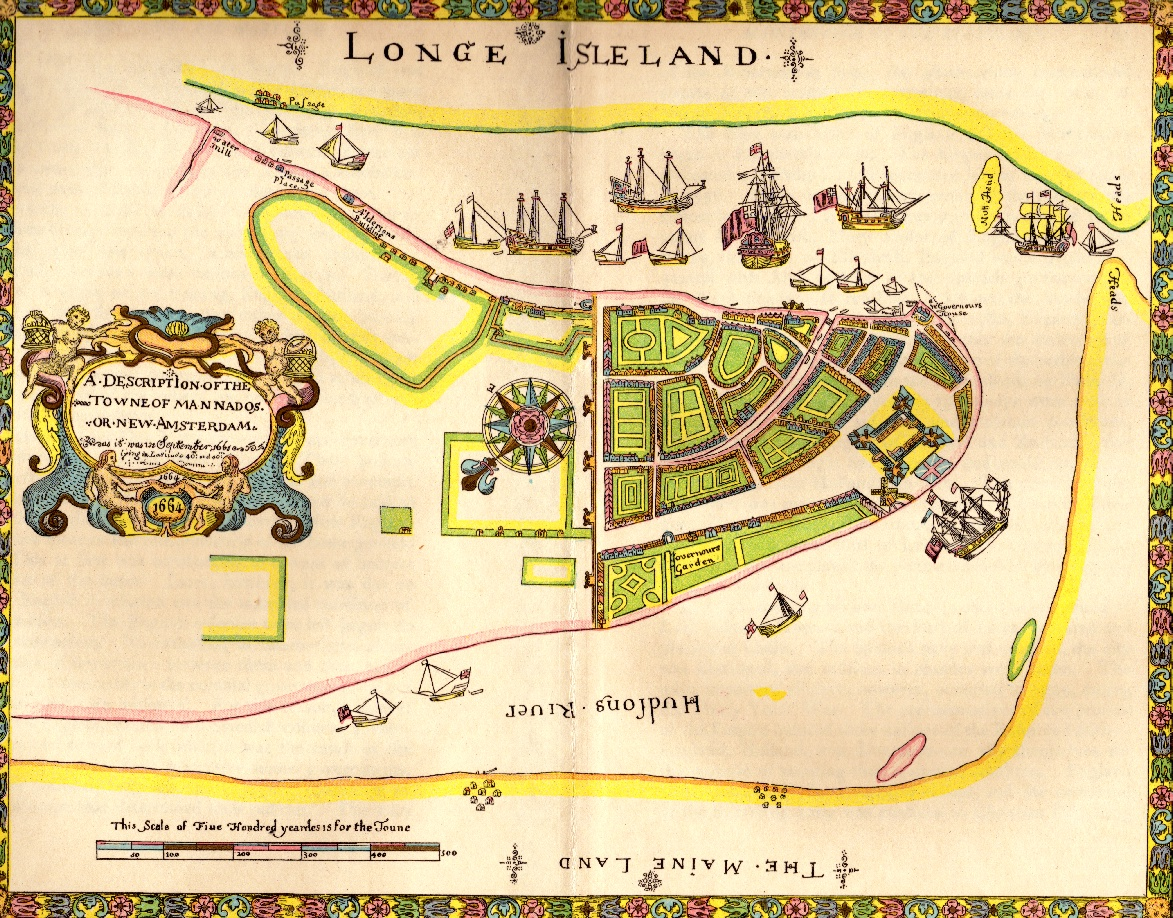
Map of Manhattan in 1664 with the fort on the right (north is to the left)

On 29 August 1664, four English warships under the command of Colonel Richard Nicolls, carrying 450 well-trained soldiers and bearing 120 heavy guns, arrived in New Amsterdam's harbor. Fort Amsterdam had a garrison of 250 men with only 24 pieces of artillery. Supplies were limited and food was in short supply, precluding any chance of enduring a prolonged siege. After surrounding the fort with ships and landed soldiers Nicolls demanded the Dutch surrender of the colony and Fort Amsterdam, which at the time was almost useless as a defense against a professional army and navy. Although Peter Stuyvesant, the Director of New Netherland, with his guns in place and ready to fire, was prepared to fight, prominent city residents, including Stuyvesant's son Balthazar, Hendrick Kip and Reverend Megapolensis, all of whom signed a formal Remonstrance, persuaded Stuyvesant to stand down in the face of overwhelming odds. On September 8, Stuyvesant raised the white flag of surrender and subsequently, after much protest and deliberation, he signed the colony over without any blood-shed during the Second Anglo–Dutch War. At the behest of the James II, Duke of York, Nicoll's was appointed governor whose objective was to oversee the occupation of the Dutch colony and establish government.

As the first governor of the province of New York, Nicoll's was greeted cordially by the Dutch and civic authorities whom he allowed to keep their offices and other stations. Under the previous rule of the West India Company, and their appointed governors, the rulership was autocratic; it denied basic rights of the people that were enjoyed in Holland, the motherland, while it favored the aristocratic class with grants of land and other special favors. As a result, the new English government was well received by most of the citizens, who were well rooted in Dutch and England culture and ideology, countries with strong democratic principles, derived from the Great Privilege and the Magna Carta, both documents of Catholic origin. The official capitulation of New Amsterdam to the English occurred on September 6, 1664.

Nichols' first official act was to rename the city from New Amsterdam to New York, in recognition of James's title as Duke of York, while the fort was renamed Fort James, in honor of James II of England. Designed primarily as a defense against Indians the fort was considered almost useless for guarding the entry to the Hudson River or repelling a military siege, and subsequently in 1684 a battery was erected at the southernmost shore of the island and fitted out with artillery. In 1668 Nicolls resigned the governorship and returned to England, where he resumed his service to the Duke of York. He was replaced as governor by Francis Lovelace on 28 August 1668. (Note: Nicolls stayed on for a few months and prepared Lovelace for the affairs of his office, and sat with Lovelace during his initial presiding in the Admiralty Court. Later they traveled together to various parts of the province, spending a week in Albany, where they were received by the Van Rensselaer family, and later smoked a peace-pipe with the Mohawk Sachems.)

=== Dutch rule (1673–1674) ===
Beginning in the spring of 1672, the Third Anglo-Dutch War broke out. The following year, two Dutch fleets, commanded by Admiral Cornelis Evertsen (Note: Cornelis was the son of Admiral Johan Evertsen.) aboard the flagship Swaenenburgh, (Note: Swaenenburgh was formerly HMS Saint Patrick, a Fourth-rate vessel which had been captured by the Dutch in the Second Anglo-Dutch War, on 5 February 1667, and commissioned in the Zeeland navy.) and Commodore Jacob Binckes, had combined their fleets and were plundering English shipping in the Caribbean and Chesapeake Bay, before they arrived at Fort James on 7 August 1673, which was Evertsen's ultimate objective before he departed Holland which at the time was almost defenseless in the face of such a force. The fleet, consisting of twenty-three ships, carrying 1,600 men, was alarming to acting captain Sheriff John Manning, who was left in command while Lovelace was away visiting Governor Winthrop at Hartford. The fort at this time only had a garrison of no more than 80 men with only 30–36 guns mounted along its walls. Manning tried in vain to summon reinforcements from nearby towns and made attempts to forestall the eminent recapture of Fort James.

Before the arrival of the Dutch fleet, the Dutch burghers and 400 Dutch colonists had grown impatient and resentful with English rulership as their appeals for rights and liberties were constantly ignored, and conveyed this sentiment to the Dutch upon their arrival. Manning sent an envoy of three men from the fort to Admiral Evertsen's ship with a message asking why the Dutch had arrived "in such a hostile manner". Evertsen replied that they had come to take back what he felt was rightfully theirs. The envoy then insisted that they see Evertsen's commission, where he replied that it was stuck in the barrel of his cannon, and that the English would see it soon enough if they did not surrender the fort. Subsequently, the next day the Dutch fleet exchanged broadsides with the fort for about four hours, while Anthony Colve, commander of Marines, landed 600 men on the west side of Manhattan Island and on 30 July 1673, forced the English garrison into surrendering the fort. (Note: Manning was later accused of treason for surrendering the fort too easily, but was acquitted, however, he was later retried and found guilty of cowardice.) On August 2, with New Amsterdam once again under Dutch rule, the Council of War appointed Colve as military governor-general of the province and Fort Orange, who in turn appointed Cornelius Steenwyk as Councillor of State, with executive privileges. (Note: Steenwyk would later go on to be the 4th mayor of New York in 1668.)

In 1674, the fort and New Orange were turned back over to the English in the Treaty of Westminster (1674) which included a provision that the colony of New Netherland be returned to England, which ended the war (the Dutch got Suriname). The fort was officially renamed Fort Willem Hendrick in honor of William III of England, who was Stadtholder and Prince of Orange, and changed the name from New Orange back to New York.

=== English rule (1674–1689) ===
After the treaty was secured, the English once again named the area "New York" and returned the Fort James name. Edmund Andros was appointed governor and served from 9 February 1674, to 18 April 1683. On 10 November 1674, Andros received the surrender of the town, while their religious and other rights and property were not lost or compromised.

In September 1682, James, Lord Proprietor of the Province of New York, appointed Thomas Dongan, 2nd Earl of Limerick, an Irishman and staunch Catholic, who had arrived at New York on 25 August 1683, as Vice-admiral in the Navy and provincial governor (1683–1688) to replace Edmund Andros. Dongan organized the first representative assembly of New York Province at Fort James, on 14 October 1683.

Dongan had served in the French army for many years, which made him familiar with French customs and diplomacy. His service in the Low Countries had given him a first-hand knowledge of the Dutch language. Upon his arrival, Dongan was not very impressed with New York, which at the time was a small town, and likewise had the same regard for the fort, which after he inspected it, said its walls could be battered down by artillery in an hour. On the face of the gate to the fort was a faded emblem of the Coat of Arms of the Duke of York. Here, Dongan turned and bowed to the cheering crowd and entered the fort. He was greeted by Captain Anthony Brockholls, the acting governor of the Province of New York, and commander of the fort, who was accompanied by a company of regular infantry. Brockholls exclaimed to Dongan that he had great difficulty maintaining order, and that he was relieved over his arrival. At the time of his appointment, the province was bankrupt and in a state of rebellion. Dongan was able to restore order and stability.

=== Colonist rule (1689–1691) ===
In 1689, following the Glorious Revolution (English Revolution of 1688), in which William and Mary acceded to the throne, German-born colonist Jacob Leisler seized Fort James in what was called Leisler's Rebellion, replacing deposed Francis Nicholson who had fled New York City. Leisler arrived at New Amsterdam from England in 1660, a penniless soldier of the East India Company. He started out in the trade business and soon married a rich merchant's widow, and by 1689 he achieved prosperity and respectability. As acting governor of New York, he represented the common people against a group of wealthy leaders (represented by Pieter Stuyvesant and others) and enacted a government of direct popular representation as well as bringing reform to the many governmental provisions that previously existed. The people appealed to Stuyvesant to capitulate and accept the generous offers Leisler was providing, as they had already endured corruption, abuse, and other hardships under the previous rulership. At the direction of governor Henry Sloughter, Leisler and ten others were eventually arrested and imprisoned at the fort. After a long and involved trial, Leissler, along with Jacob Milborne, were found guilty of treason and executed on 16 May 1691. (Note: Massachusetts Governor Thomas Hutchinson would later write that politics after 1691 were "prejudiced" by the legacy that Leisler had left. Leisler had "created a precedent for popular politics", consisting of two factions, Leislerian and anti-Leislerian, that remained for many years thereafter.)

=== British rule (1691–1775) ===
Leisler's rule ended in 1691, when British sovereign William's new governor (appointed in 1690) finally reached New York. The fort had earlier been named for Willem when he was head of the Dutch government. He became the sovereign of the English government by the overthrow of King James II in the Glorious Revolution. The fort was renamed Fort William Henry in honor of the new Protestant king.

Governor Hunter was replaced by William Burnet who arrived at Manhattan on 16 September 1720. Rather than calling for elections for a new assembly, as was customary, Burnet summoned the standing provincial assembly, with whom he found favor, to meet at Fort George, where it voted for revenues to sustain the government for the following five years. The assembly also prohibited any trading of Indian goods with the French, which greatly compromised the business interests of New York's merchants.

In 1756, John Campbell, Earl of Loudoun, was appointed commander of all English forces in North America Prompted by the loss of Fort Oswego during the French and Indian War, he sent one thousand regulars to strategically located New York City for winter quarters. The old barracks in Fort George were prepared for them, while the fort underwent repairs and major improvements to its structure. To aid in the defense of the harbor, a good number of heavy cannon were also added to the battery and other strategic locations near the fort.

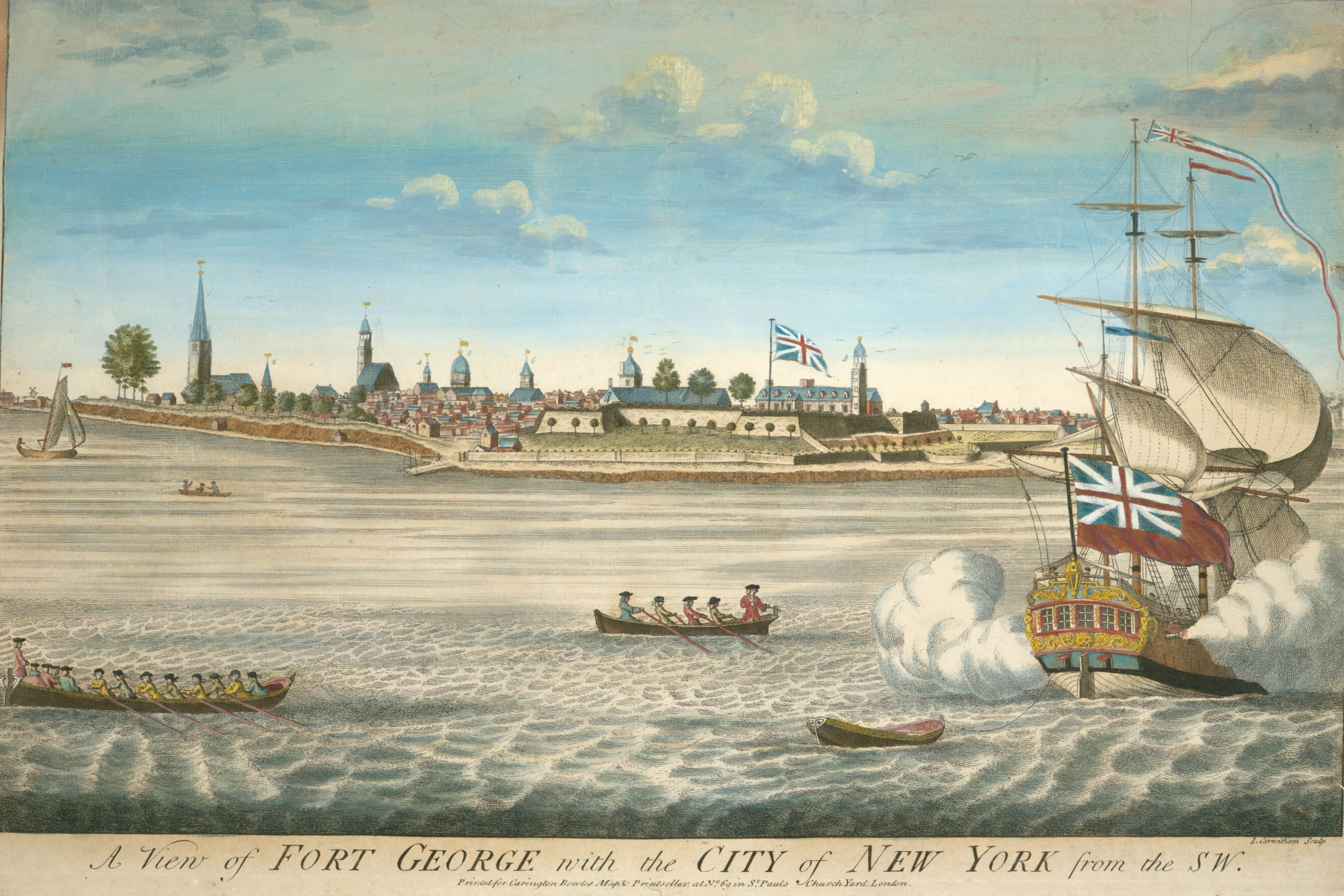
View of Fort George from the harbor

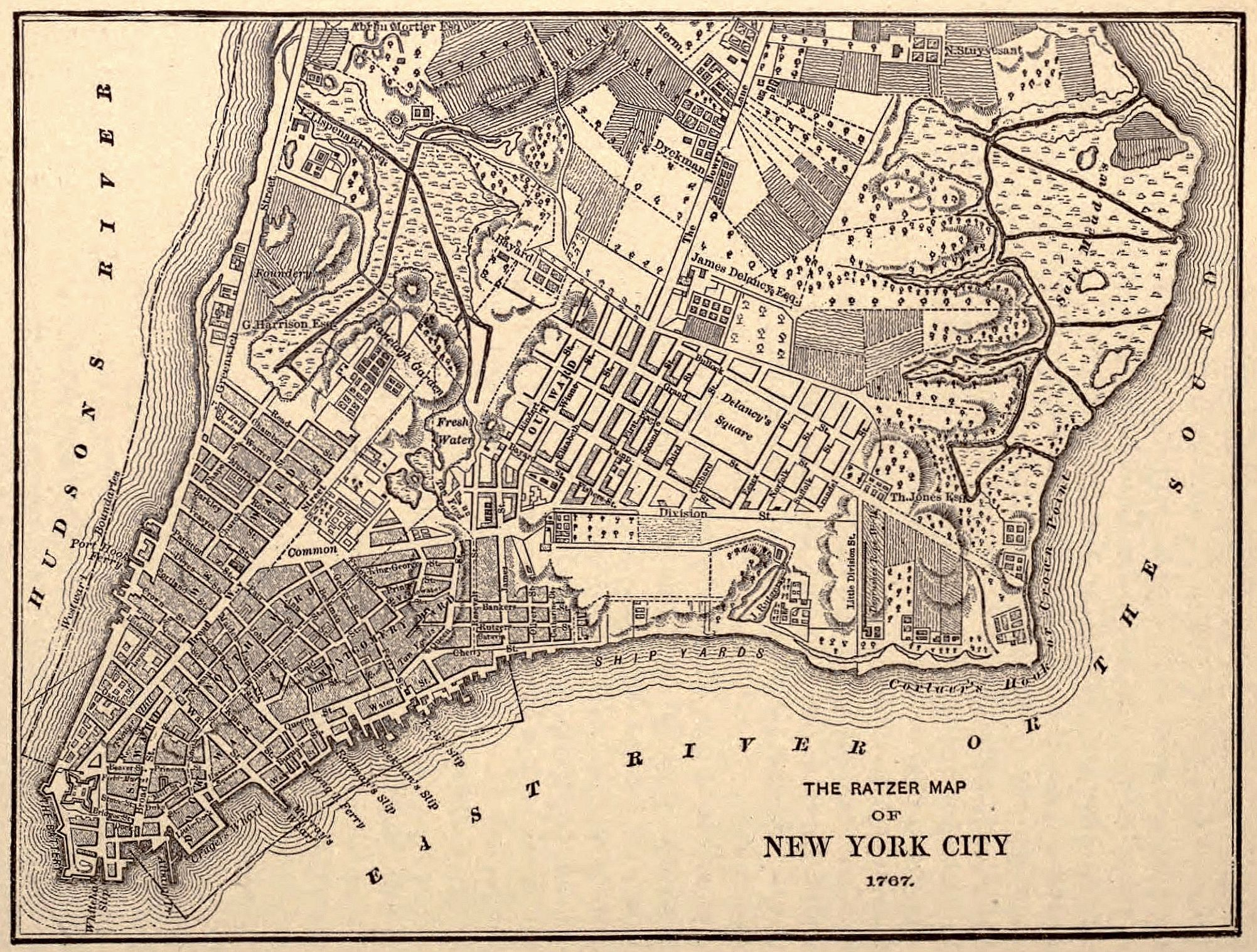
Map of New York City, 1767

=== Prelude to the revolution ===
Fort George became the target of American riots following Parliament's passage of the Stamp Act on 4 March 1765. The first shipment of stamps for New York and Connecticut arrived at New York on 23 October 1765. The ships were confronted by some 2000 angry colonists. Subsequently, the stamps had to be quietly unloaded in the middle of the night and brought into Fort George, which at the time had a garrison of only 200 regulars. On October 31, the day before the Stamp Act was to be enforced, thousands of colonists took to the streets. As a precaution, British authorities beforehand had the guns at the battery spiked along with any not inside the fort, making them inoperable. The protests, agitation and violence over the Stamp Act reached a climax from November 1–3, as a result of the arrival of the stamps brought to and held at Fort George.

Cadwallader Colden, the acting governor of the Province of New York from 1763 to 1765, was residing at the fort at the time, but admitted that he had no real authority outside its gates. On 1 November 1765, the garrison was put on alert and manned the walls of the fort, and was soon greeted by the approaching colonists. A courier emerged from the crowd and approached the gate, bearing a message for Cadwallader, which he handed to the sentry. Addressed to Cadwallader specifically, its message was the culmination of over a year's frustration and anger over the proposed imposition of the Stamp Act, which ultimately gave Cadwallader, now 77 years of age, an ultimatum, threatening in pointed language that he not participate in the enforcement of the Stamp Act. Reports of violent riots occurring in Newport, Boston, and elsewhere continued to reach Cadwallader's desk. Jared Ingersoll, stamp agent from Connecticut, and William Franklin, Governor of New Jersey, under extreme pressure not to enforce the Stamp Act had their supplies of stamped paper transported to Fort George for safe keeping.

During the early morning hours of November 2, engineers and workers worked earnestly to strengthen the fort. Artillery office Major Thomas James was in command of the fort, who later testified before Parliament that he could have killed more than 900 of the rioters, but added that had he done so, the colonists could in little time have amassed 50,000 fighting men from New York alone, and that there would have been no chance in holding the fort. General Gage later said that had the colonists been fired on, the revolution would have begun that year. Colden, concerned that Fort George had an inadequate garrison, requested reinforcements, which General Gage provided, while James brought new cannons to the fort. The fort also provided a safe haven for several stamp masters, including Zachariah Hood from Maryland, who, at the invitation of Colden, had fled to the fort to escape the wrath of the Sons of Liberty and other angry colonists.

In the face of growing numbers of angry colonists, General Gage and the Governor's Council, wanting to spare New York's Loyalist families from what seemed like imminent ruin, insisted that Colden strike a compromise and surrender the stamped paper. After initially delaying, Colden, now acting as an official stamp distributor, knowing he could not stand alone on matters, ultimately convinced the Common Council to pay for all surrendered and destroyed stamps. The subsequent surrender of the stamps brought calm to the city, while New York's colonial newspapers called for peace. After calm returned to the city Colden's political adversaries blamed him for the mishap, and ultimately had his governorship replaced by Sir Henry Moore. In the effort to maintain peace and restore order to the city, Moore had met with the influential Isaac Sears, a leader of the Sons of Liberty, and others, and shortly thereafter opened the gates of the fort and invited everyone in.

=== Colonist rule (1775–1776) ===
In the American Revolution, the colonists under George Washington seized the fort in 1775, before the colonies formally seceded from the British Empire. During the Battle of Long Island, guns from the fort engaged British frigates starting on 12 July 1776. On July 12, the British ships HMS Phoenix and HMS Rose, with a few smaller vessels in attendance, sailed from Staten Island and began moving into the mouth of the Hudson River, prompting alarm guns to sound in New York. The cannons from batteries at Red Hook and Governors Island commenced firing at the small British fleet. Artillery fire also commenced from Fort George, under the command of New York artillery captain Alexander Hamilton, who at the time was nineteen, but had little effect. Fearing that the British capture of the fort was eminent, Hamilton and his artillery teams hauled off more than ten cannons, shortly before a barge from HMS Asia approached and fired on the fort and its vicinity.

In September 1776, under the command of Henry Clinton the British made a Landing at Kip's Bay, and soon recaptured Fort George, along with lower Manhattan, forcing General Washington and his army to retreat north and eventually into New Jersey, at Valley Forge where they would remain for most of the following winter. The British soon occupied the entire city and ruled New York from the fort throughout the war.

=== British rule (1776–1783) ===
The British occupied the city and ruled New York from Fort George throughout the remainder of the war. Having been subjected to a large fire in 1776, the city experienced another great fire in 1778, with the subsequent destruction of many dwellings, and along with the British presence, the city became very crowded with overall poor living conditions for many of its inhabitants. After the British occupation of Manhattan Island was completed, the fort was not involved in any further military engagements for the remainder of the war.

=== American rule (1783–1790) ===
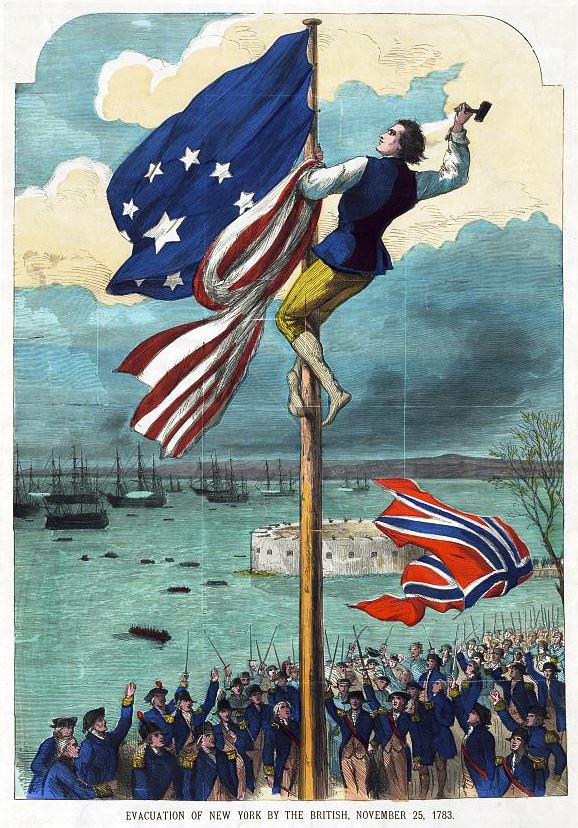
John Van Arsdale securing the American flag

After peace was established with Britain in 1783, Washington received word that the British would soon evacuate New York. As Washington and his army marched south on Manhattan Island, Washington noted the devastation, lack of trees, shrubs, and the many buildings that were left in ruins. Washington's advance came to a halt at the barrier enclosing the inner city and Fort George. A volley of cannon signaled that the British had departed New York. While waiting for the American army to secure the island, Washington received word that the British had sabotaged the flag pole inside Fort George, by removing its ropes, knocking off its the cleats and by greasing the pole, all as measures taken to hinder the Americans from raising their flag at the fort. After a brief reception at Cape's Tavern, Washington, Governor Clinton and the cavalcade entered the fort. After an extended effort the flagpole was repaired and its missing parts replaced, after which John Van Arsdale ascended the pole and attached the American flag, on Evacuation Day, 25 November 1783, after the British finally pulled out.

In 1788, the government ordered the razing of Fort George (as it was then known). Its materials were used as landfill to add to the shore and expand the Battery. The fort was torn down in 1790, and the Government House, intended as the presidential residence, was built on the site.

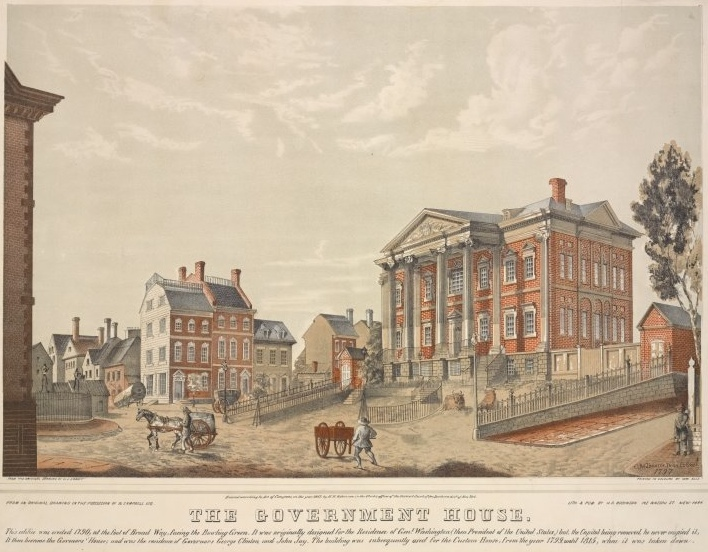
The Government House, built on the site of Fort George in 1790

The need for new fortifications soon became apparent, especially as tensions started rising again with France and Great Britain. In 1798, guns were placed in temporary fortifications on the Battery. Eventually a new fort, Castle Clinton, was built on Lower Manhattan to the southwest, shortly before the outbreak of the War of 1812 with Britain.

The site of Fort James was redeveloped for the Alexander Hamilton U.S. Custom House. Prior to landfilling and the creation of Battery Park, it was located at the shoreline of the Hudson River but is now a few blocks away.

== See also ==
- List of Directors of New Netherland
- Fortifications of New Netherland
- New Netherland settlements
- History of New York City (prehistory–1664)
- History of New York City (1665–1783)
- Dutch colonization of the Americas
- List of colonial governors of New York
- Province of New York and the Stamp Act
- Stamp Act Congress
- Fort Amsterdam (Curaçao)

== Bibliography ==
- Bachman, Van Cleaf (1969). Peltries or plantations; the economic policies of the Dutch West India Company in New Netherland, 1623–1639. Johns Hopkins Press. ISBN 978-0-8018-1064-0.
- Barnes, Viola Florence (1932). Malone, Dumas (ed.). Dictionary of American biography. Vol. I. New York: Charles Scribner's Sons.
- Becker, Carl (October 1901). "Growth of Revolutionary Parties and Methods in New York Province 1765–1774". The American Historical Review. 7 (1). Oxford University Press on behalf of the American Historical Association: 56–76. doi:10.2307/1832532. JSTOR 1832532.
- Brodhead, John Romeyn (1853). History of the state of New York. Vol. I. Harper & Brothers.
- Brodhead, John Romeyn (1871). History of the state of New York. Vol. II. Harper & Brothers.
- Burke, Thomas E. Jr. (October 1989). "Leisler's Rebellion at Schenectady, New York, 1689–1710". New York History. 70 (4). Fenimore Art Museum: 405–430. JSTOR 23178501.
- Chernow, Ron (2004). Alexander Hamilton. New York: Penguin Press. ISBN 978-0-14303-4759.
- Darling, Charles W. (1854). History of New Amsterdam: or New York as it was in the days of the Dutch governors. R. T. Young.
- Day, Richard E. (1935). Malone, Dumas (ed.). Dictionary of American biography. Vol. XVII. New York: Charles Scribner's Sons.
- De Jong, Gerald Francis (December 1971). "The Dutch Reformed Church and Negro Slavery in Colonial America". Church History. 40 (4). Cambridge University Press on behalf of the American Society of Church History: 423–436. doi:10.2307/3163567. JSTOR 3163567. S2CID 162532296.
- Doyle, John Andrew (1882) [1882]. English colonies in America. Vol. IV. Longmans, Green and Co.
- Driscoll, John T. (1913). Thomas Dongan. Vol. 5. The Catholic Encyclopedia, Knight Of Columbus Special Edition.
- Eldridge, Paul (1957). Crown of empire; the story of New York State. New York: A.S. Barnes & Company, Inc.
- Engelman, F. L. (October 1953). "Cadwallader Colden and the New York Stamp Act Riots". The William and Mary Quarterly. 10 (4). Omohundro Institute of Early American History and Culture: 560–578. doi:10.2307/1923595. JSTOR 1923595.
- Fiske, John (1899). The Dutch and Quaker colonies in America. Vol. I. Boston; New York: Houghton, Mifflin and Company.
- —— (1899). The Dutch and Quaker colonies in America. Vol. II. Boston; New York: Houghton, Mifflin and Company.
- Flexner, James Thomas (1968). George Washington in the American Revolution, 1775–1783. Boston: Little, Brown.
- Goodwin, Maud Wilder (1897). Fort Amsterdam in the days of the Dutch. New York: The Knickerbocker press.
- ——; Royce, Alice Carrington; Putnam, Ruth (1897). Historic New York. Vol. I. New York, London: G. P. Putnam's sons.
- Hemstreet, Charles (1899). Nooks and Corners of Old New York. New York: Charles Scribner's Sons.
- Hopkins, Joseph G. E (1957). Colonial Governor, Thomas Dongan of New York. New YorK; P.J. Kenedy & Sons.
- —— (1936). Dictionary of American biography. Vol. XIX.
  New York: Charles Scribner's Sons.
- Jacobs, Jaap (2009). The Colony of New Netherland: A Dutch Settlement in Seventeenth-century America. Cornell University Press. ISBN 978-0-80147-5160.
- Jameson, John Franklin (1909). Narratives of New Netherland, 1609–1664. Vol. VIII. Charles Scribner Sons.
- Jones, Frederick Robertson (1904). Lee, Guy Carleton (ed.). The colonization of the middle states and Maryland. Vol. IV. George Barrie & Sons.
- ——; Thorpe, Francis Newton (1903). "The Dutch Under English Rule". In Lee, Guy Carleton (ed.). The History of North America. New York: G. Barrie & sons. p. 167. "Willem Hendrick"
- Kammen, Michael G. (1975). Colonial New York: a history. New York: Charles Scribner Sons. ISBN 978-0-68414-3255. (Reprinted in 1996) ISBN 978-0-19510-7791
- Lamb, Martha Joanna; Harrison, Burton (1896) [1877]. History of the City of New York: its origin, rise and progress. Vol. I. New York: A. S. Barnes and Company.
- McCullough, David (2005). 1776. New York: Simon & Schuster. ISBN 978-0-74322-6714.
- McKinley, Albert E. (July 1901). "The Transition From Dutch to English Rule in New York: A Study in Political Imitation". The American Historical Review. 6 (4). Oxford University Press on behalf of the American Historical Association: 593–724. doi:10.2307/1834176. JSTOR 1834176.
- Morgan, Edmund Sears; Morgan, Helen M. (1953). The Stamp act crisis; prologue to revolution. University of North Carolina Press.
- O'Callaghan, Edmund Bailey (1948). History of New Netherland. Vol. I. D. Appleton & co.
- Phelan, Thomas (December 1911). "Thomas Dongan, Catholic Colonial Governor of New York". Records of the American Catholic Historical Society of Philadelphia. 22 (4). American Catholic Historical Society: 207–237. JSTOR 44208940.
- Ranlet, Philip (1986). The New York loyalists. Knoxville: University of Tennessee Press. ISBN 978-0-87049-5038.
- Reich, J. R. (1953). Leisler's Rebellion: A Study of Democracy in New York, 1664–1720. University of Chicago Press. OCLC 476516.
- Riker, James (1883). "Evacuation day", 1783. Library of Congress.
- Shomette, Donald; Haslach, Robert D (1988). Raid on America: the Dutch naval campaign of 1672–1674. University of South Carolina Press. ISBN 978-0-78842-2454.
- Shorto, Russell (2004). The island at the center of the world. New York : Doubleday. ISBN 978-1-40007-8677.
- Stokes, Isaac Newton Phelps (1915). The iconography of Manhattan Island, 1498–1909. Vol. I. New York: Robert H. Dodd. "compiled from original sources and illustrated by photo-intaglio reproductions of important maps, plans, views, and documents in public and private collections"
- Syrett, Harold C. (October 1954). "Private Enterprise in New Amsterdam". The William and Mary Quarterly. 11 (4). Omohundro Institute of Early American History and Culture: 536–550. doi:10.2307/1923076. JSTOR 1923076.
- van Laer, A.J.F., ed. (1924). Documents relating to New Netherland, 1624–1626, in the Henry E. Huntington Library. West-Indische Compagnie (Netherlands); Henry E. Huntington Library and Art Gallery.
- Van Rensselaer, Schuyler (1909). History of the city of New York in the seventeenth century. Vol. I. The Macmillan Company.
- Father Joseph Vann, ed. (1953). Lives of Saints. John J. Crawley.
- Voorhees, David William (Winter 1997). ""to assert our Right before it be quite lost": The Leisler Rebellion in the Delaware River Valley". Pennsylvania History: A Journal of Mid-Atlantic Studies. 64 (1). Penn State University Press: 5–27. JSTOR 27773953.
- Wilson, James Grant (1892–1893). The memorial history of the city of New York, from its first settlement to the year 1892. Vol. I. New York History Co.
- —— (1892–1893). The memorial history of the city of New York, from its first settlement to the year 1892. Vol. II. New York History Co.
- "Historic Timeline of The Battery". The Battery Conservancy. Archived from the original on 2009-02-28.
- National Parks of New York Harbor Conservancy. The New Amsterdam Trail (PDF). Archived from the original (PDF) on 2011-12-04.
- "Cornelius Jacobsen Mey, Director of New Netherland". New Netherland Institute.
- "Fort Amsterdam". New Netherland Institute.

=== Further reading ===
- Klooster, Wim (2016). The Dutch moment: war, trade, and settlement in the seventeenth-century Atlantic world. Cornell University Press. ISBN 978-0-80145-0457.
- Megapolensis, Johannes Jr. (1644). Brodhead, John Romeyn (ed.). A Short Sketch of the Mohawk Indians in New Netherland (PDF).
- Ruttenber, Edward Manning (1872). History of the Indian tribes of Hudson's River. Albany, N.Y.: J. Munsell.
- Good, James I. (April 1923). "A Calvinistic Founder of America: Peter Minuit". Journal of the Presbyterian Historical Society (1901–1930). 11 (7). Presbyterian Historical Society: 260–267. JSTOR 23323599.
