= Birch's Views of Philadelphia =

1800 book of prints by William Russell Birch and Thomas Birch

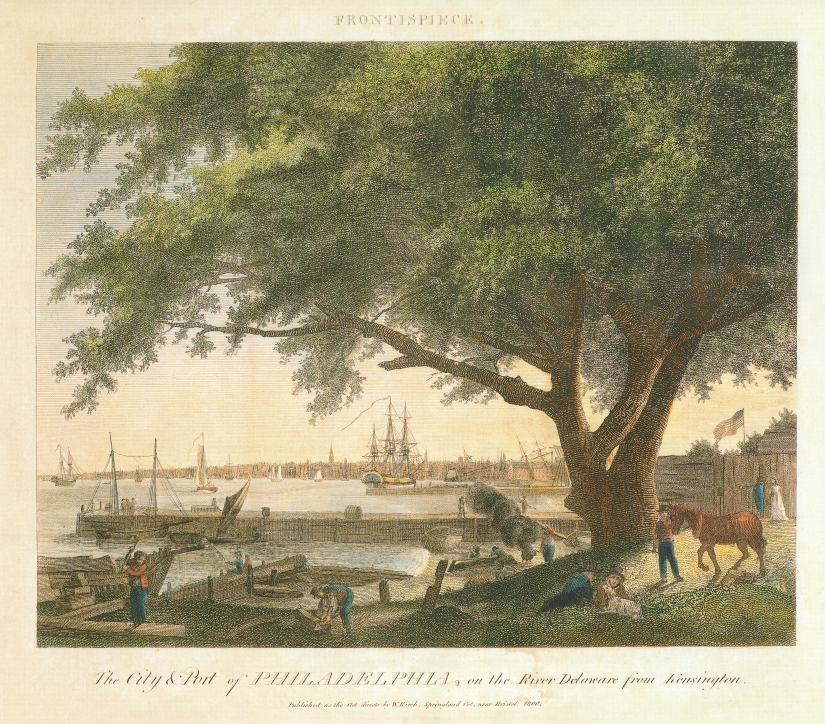
The City & Port of Philadelphia, on the River Delaware from Kensington, an iconic portrait of the elm tree in Philadelphia where tradition holds that William Penn signed the Treaty of Shackamaxon with the Lenape Indian tribe in 1682

Birch's Views of Philadelphia was an 1800 book of prints drawn and engraved by William Russell Birch (1755–1834) and his son Thomas Birch (1779–1851). The 27 illustrations of the city are extraordinarily valuable to historians because they document Philadelphia architecture and street-life at the beginning of the nineteenth century.

Formally titled The City of Philadelphia, in the State of Pennsylvania North America; as it appeared in the Year 1800, the volume was self-published by William Birch in December 1800. Birch was a British-born miniature painter and engraver, and this became his most famous work.

Philadelphia was the temporary capital of the United States when the Birches began the project in 1798. Thomas Jefferson, then Vice President of the United States, was among the 156 subscribers to the initial printing. Other subscribers included British Minister to the U.S. Robert Liston, Spanish Minister to the U.S. The Chevalier d'Yrujo, former Pennsylvania Governor Thomas Mifflin, New York City Mayor Richard Varick, architect Benjamin Latrobe, artist Edward Savage, and several members of Congress. The 1804 second edition listed former U.S. President John Adams as a subscriber.

The views depict monuments, everyday life, and even reflect politics of the era. Plate 28 shows a technological marvel, the Water Works in Center Square, a water tower fed by steam pumps that made Philadelphia the first city in the United States with a general water-supply system. Two of the plates portray Native American delegations touring the city, and at least two plates include African Americans. Plate 29 shows the USS Frigate Philadelphia being built in a Southwark shipyard, but the engraving's ominous title, "Preparation for WAR to defend Commerce," refers to the 1798-1800 Quasi-War with France, in which hundreds of American merchant vessels were boarded or seized.

The Birches created additional views, and updated old ones, including reworking a view of Market Street to show the December 26, 1799 national funeral procession for George Washington. Birch's Views sold well and went into multiple editions, inspiring the pair to publish similar collected views of New York City, and of suburban estates surrounding Philadelphia and Baltimore.

== First edition ==
Page	Image	Title	Description	Notes
Title Page; Plate 1		"The City of Philadelphia, in the State of Pennsylvania North America; as it appeared in the Year 1800"		
Frontispiece; Plate 2		"The City & Port of Philadelphia, on the River Delaware from Kensington."	Taken from about 2 miles north of the city. The spire left of center is Christ Church.	Pennsylvania tradition holds that the Colony's founder, William Penn, signed his 1682 treaty with the Leni Lenape tribe beneath this ancient tree. The "Treaty Elm" blew down in 1810, and the site is now Penn Treaty Park.
Plan of the City; Plate 3		"Plan of the City of Philadelphia"		
Introduction				
Plate 4		"Arch Street Ferry, Philadelphia."		
Plate 5		"Arch Street, with the Second Presbyterian Church. Philadelphia."		
Plate 6		"New Lutheran Church, in Fourth Street Philadelphia."	Zion Lutheran Church (built 1769, demolished 1869). Note the Native American delegation touring the city.	The national funeral service for George Washington was held in this church on December 26, 1799. In his oration, "Light Horse Harry" Lee described the late President as "First in War, First in Peace, and First in the Hearts of His Countrymen."
Plate 7		"Old Lutheran Church, in Fifth Street Philadelphia."	St. Michael's Lutheran Church (built 1743-48, demolished 1872).	
Plate 8		"South East Corner of Third and Market Streets, Philadelphia."	Cooke Building (built about 1792, demolished about 1838). "Cooke's Folly" was a grand commercial building built by jeweler Joseph Cooke.	
Plate 9		"High Street, with the First Presbyterian Church"		
Plate 10		"High Street Market"		
Plate 11		"High Street, From the Country Market-place Philadelphia: with the procession in commemoration of the Death of General George Washington, December 26, 1799."	George Washington died at Mount Vernon, Virginia, on December 14, 1799. A national funeral procession and service for the late President was held in Philadelphia on December 26, 1799.	Birch reworked this early view into Plate 11. Note that the Water Works (built 1799-1800) is absent from the early view, but is visible in the background of Plate 11.
Plate 12		"High Street, from Ninth Street Philadelphia."		
Plate 13		"The House intended for the President of the United States, in Ninth Street Philadelphia."	President's House on Ninth Street	Pennsylvania built this executive mansion in the 1790s as part of a failed effort to persuade Congress to name Philadelphia the permanent capital of the United States. President George Washington, and later President John Adams, declined to occupy it. Following 10 years in Philadelphia, the national capital moved to the District of Columbia in 1800. The mansion housed the University of Pennsylvania from 1802 to 1829, when it was demolished.
Plate 14		"An Unfinished House, in Chestnut Street Philadelphia."	Robert Morris Mansion (designed 1792-93, never completed, demolished about 1800), Pierre Charles L'Enfant, architect.	Morris bought up nearly the entire block bounded by Chestnut, Walnut, 7th and 8th Streets, and began construction of this mansion. L'Enfant, the French designer of Washington, D.C., was his architect. "Morris's Folly" was never completed due to the financier's bankruptcy. Jewelers' Row now occupies the site.
Plate 15		"Second Street North from Market St. with Christ Church. Philadelphia."		
Plate 16		"New Market, in Second Street Philadelphia."		
Plate 17		"Bank of the United States, in Third Street Philadelphia."		
Plate 18		"View in Third Street, from Spruce Street Philadelphia."		
Plate 19		"Library and Surgeons Hall, in Fifth Street Philadelphia."		
Plate 20		"Congress Hall and New Theatre, in Chestnut Street Philadelphia."		
Plate 21		"State-House, With a View of Chestnut Street Philadelphia."		
Plate 22		"Back of the State House, Philadelphia."		
Plate 23		"State-House Garden, Philadelphia."		
Plate 24		"Goal [Gaol or Jail], in Walnut Street Philadelphia."		
Plate 25		"Alms House in Spruce Street Philadelphia."		
Plate 26		"Pennsylvania Hospital, in Pine Street Philadelphia	Pennsylvania Hospital	
Plate 27		"Bank of Pennsylvania, South Second Street Philadelphia."	Bank of Pennsylvania (built 1798-1801, demolished 1870), Benjamin Henry Latrobe, architect. To the left is the City Tavern (built 1773, demolished 1854, recreated 1976).	Latrobe's Bank of Pennsylvania was the first example of Greek Revival architecture built in the United States. This new view of the bank was published in the 4th edition of Birch's Views (1828).
Plate 28		"The Water Works, in Centre Square Philadelphia."	Water Works Pump House (built 1799-1800, demolished 1827-28), Benjamin Henry Latrobe, architect; Frederick Graff, engineer. Centre Square is now the site of Philadelphia City Hall.	Philadelphia built the first citywide water system in the United States. Steam pumps drew drinking water from the Schuylkill River, a mile away, and pumped it into tanks in the dome of the Water Works. Gravity then distributed it through wooden water mains.
Plate 29		"Preparation for WAR to defend Commerce. The Swedish Church Southwark with the building of the Frigate Philadelphia."	Gloria Dei (Old Swedes') Church	
Subscriber List				

== Later editions ==
William and Thomas Birch published a second edition in 1804, a third edition in 1809, and a fourth (and final) edition in 1828.
