= EOM =

Eom or EOM may refer to:

== People ==
- Eom (Korean surname)

== Science and technology ==
- Electro-optic modulator
- End of message
- Enterprise output management
- Equations of motion
- Ensemble optimization method; see Biological small-angle scattering

== Other uses ==
- Employee of the month (program)
- Encyclopedia of Mathematics
- Encyclopedia of Mormonism
- English-only movement, a political movement in the United States
- Estatuto Orgânico de Macau, an organic statute of Portuguese Macau
- End Of Month
