= End of message =

End of a message, often an e-mail message

End of message or EOM (as in "(EOM)" or "<EOM>") signifies the end of a message, often an e-mail message.

== Usage ==
The subject of an e-mail message may contain such an abbreviation to signify that all content is in the subject line so that the message itself does not need to be opened (e.g., "No classes Monday (EOM)" or "Midterm delayed <EOM>"). This practice can save the time of the receiver and has been recommended to increase productivity.

EOM can also be used in conjunction with no reply necessary, or NRN, to signify that the sender does not require (or would prefer not to receive) a response (e.g., "Campaign has launched (EOM/NRN)") or reply requested or RR to signify that the sender wishes a response (e.g., "Got a minute? (EOM/RR)"). These are examples of Internet slang.

EOM is often used this way, as a synonym to NRN, in blogs and forums online. It is often a snide way for commenters to imply that their message is so perfect that there can be no logical response to it. Or it can be used as a way of telling another specific poster to stop writing back.

EOM can also be defined as the final 3 buzzes of an alert of the Emergency Alert System to know when the alert is finished.

== Origin ==
In earlier communications methods, an end of message ("EOM") sequence of characters indicated to a receiving device or operator that the current message has ended. In teleprinter systems, the sequence "NNNN", on a line by itself, is an end of message indicator. In several Morse code conventions, including amateur radio, the prosign A̅R̅ (dit dah dit dah dit) means end of message.

In the original ASCII code, "EOM" corresponded to code 03_{hex}, which has since been renamed to "ETX" ("end of text").

== See also ==
- EOM (disambiguation)
- End-of-file, also abbreviated EOF
- List of computing and IT abbreviations
- -30-
