= List of email subject abbreviations =

This is a list of commonly and uncommonly used abbreviations that are used in the subject box of an English-language email header.

== Standard prefixes ==
These prefixes are usually automatically inserted by the email client.

- Re: or RE: followed by the subject line of a previous message indicates a reply to that message. "Re" in a narrower sense though is, as RFC 5322 3.6.5. explicitly states, an abbreviation of "in re"—"re" being the ablative singular of rēs ("thing", "circumstance")—, loosely meaning "about", "concerning", "regarding". As such, regarding is a fitting English translation with the same two initial letters as in reply. It is expressly stated in RFC 5322 3.6.5. as somewhat structuring the otherwise free-form subject field. If used, exactly one character string Re: (disregarding letter case) ought to appear at the very front of the subject line.
- Fw:, FW: or FWD: signals a forwarded message: the recipient is informed that the email was originally sent to someone else who has in turn sent a copy of the email to them.

The common appearance of "Re:" in email clients has led to the erroneous inference that re requires a colon even in running text.

== Non-standard infixes and suffixes ==
These words are inserted in the middle of or at the end of the subject, usually by the author.

- Was:, WAS: or was: indicates the subject was changed since the previous email. Not an abbreviation, but the English word "was" (past tense of "to be"). Denoting a subject change prevents confusion on the part of the recipient and avoids accusations of threadjacking in email-based discussion threads. Original subject may furthermore get parenthesised. Example: Subject: Do you know a good babysitter? (WAS: What should we do this weekend?); real-world occurrence: lore.kernel.org
- OT: off topic. Used within an email thread to indicate that this particular reply is about a different topic than the rest of the thread, in order to avoid accusations of threadjacking.
- EOM, Eom or eom – end of message. Used at the end of the subject when the entire content of the email is contained in the subject and the body remains empty. This saves the recipient's time because they then do not have to open the message.
  - 1L – One Liner. Used at the beginning of the subject when the subject of the email is the only text contained in the email. This prefix indicates to the reader that it is not necessary to open the email. E.g., "1L: WFH today"
- WFH – work from home. Used in the subject line or body of the email.
- NONB – Non-business. Used at the beginning of the subject when the subject of the email is not related to business. This prefix indicates to the reader that the email is not about a work related or endorsed topic.

== Software development ==
The following prefixes are often used in software development:

- [ANNOUNCE], [ANN] – announcement. A new version of the software has been released.
- [BUG] – bug report. A description of an error in the software.
- [PATCH] – software patch. New code is attached to or included in the body of the message.

== Other English abbreviations ==
This is a list of abbreviations which are less commonly used in the subject of an English email header:

- AEAP, meaning As Early As Possible.
- ASAP, meaning As Soon As Possible.
- AB, meaning Action By. Used with a time indicator to inform the recipient that the sender needs a task to be completed within a certain deadline, e.g. AB+2 meaning Action By 2 days.
- AR, meaning Action Required. The recipient is informed that they are being given a task.
- BLUF, meaning Bottom Line Up Front. A brief synopsis of key information typically used for higher level management communication.
- CFI, meaning Copied For Information.
- COB, meaning Close Of Business (end of work day). Implying that something should happen by the end of the typical work shift.
- COP or EOP, meaning Close Of Play / End Of Play. British sporting term referring to an overnight, intra-game, break during a cricket match which is scheduled to take place over multiple days. Also used in a similar context at The Championships.
- CTA, meaning Call to Action. Instruction to the receiver designed to provoke an immediate response.
- CWC, change in working conditions.
- EOD, meaning End Of Day.
- FYA, meaning For Your Action. The recipient is informed that they are being given a task. Can also mean For Your Attention, For Your Approval, For Your Assistance, For Your Awareness, For Your Authorization, or For Your Acknowledgement.
- FAO, meaning "For the Attention Of", especially in email or written correspondence. This can be used to direct an email towards an individual when an email is being sent to a team email address or to a specific department in a company. e.g. FAO: Jo Smith, Finance Department.
- FYI or Fyi: , "for your information". The recipient is informed that they do not have to reply to this email.
- FYSA, meaning For Your Situational Awareness. The recipient is informed that this information may be important context for other communications but contains no action required. Similar to FYI but used heavily in U.S. government and military email correspondence. (Not to be confused with FISA.)
- FYFG, meaning For Your Future Guidance. Also written as Fyfg. Used at the beginning of the subject, typically in corporate emails in which management wants to inform personnel about a new procedure they should follow.
- FYG, meaning For Your Guidance. Also written as Fyg. Used at the beginning of the subject, typically in corporate emails in which management wants to inform personnel about a new procedure they should follow.
- FYR, meaning For Your Reference. This is typically used in email subjects to send follow-up information about something the recipients already know.
- I, meaning Information. Used at the beginning of the subject. The recipient is informed that they do not have to reply to this email. May be more commonly used in Europe than in North America, where FYI may be preferred.
- LET, meaning Leaving Early Today. Used in corporate emails to indicate that the sender will be leaving the office early that day.
- LF, meaning Looking For something. Used in corporate emails to indicate that the sender is looking for that particular thing.
- LSFW, meaning Less Safe For Work. Used in corporate emails to indicate that the content may be sexually explicit or profane, helping the recipient to avoid potentially objectionable material. The wisdom of sending a corporate email containing explicit material is left unexamined.
- MIA, meaning Missing In Action. Used when original email has been lost in the work process.
- NIM, meaning No Internal Message. Used when the entire content of the email is contained in the subject and the body remains empty. This saves the recipient's time because they then do not have to open the email.
- NLS, meaning Not Life-Safe. Used to indicate that the content may be shocking or grotesque, helping the recipient to avoid potentially objectionable material.
- NM, meaning No Message. Also written as N/M, n/m, or *n/m*. Used when the entire content of the email is contained in the subject and the body remains empty. This saves the recipient's time because they then do not have to open the email.
- NB, meaning Note Well. Abbreviation of Latin nota bene. Used before a piece of important information to make readers notice it.
- NMP, meaning Not My Problem. Used in a reply to indicate that the previous email has been ignored.
- NMS, meaning Not Mind-Safe. Used to indicate that the content may be shocking or grotesque, helping the recipient to avoid potentially objectionable material.
- NNTO, meaning No Need To Open. The recipient is informed that they do not need to open the email; necessary information is in the Subject line.
- NNTR, meaning No Need To Respond. The recipient is informed that they do not have to reply to this email.
- NRN, meaning No Reply Necessary or No Reply Needed. The recipient is informed that they do not have to reply to this email.
- NRR, meaning No Reply Requested or No Reply Required. The recipient is informed that they do not have to reply to this email.
- NSFW, meaning Not Safe For Work or Not Suitable For Work. Used in corporate emails to indicate that the content may be sexually explicit or profane, helping the recipient to avoid potentially objectionable material. The wisdom of sending a corporate email containing explicit material is left unexamined.
- NSS, meaning Not School-Safe or Not School-Suitable. Used in school network emails to indicate that the content may be sexually explicit or profane, helping the recipient to avoid potentially objectionable material. The wisdom of sending explicit material to a school network is left unexamined.
- NT, meaning No Text. Also written as N/T or n/t. Used when the entire content of the email is contained in the subject and the body remains empty. This saves the recipient's time because they then do not have to open the email.
- NWR, meaning Not Work Related. Used in corporate emails to indicate that the content is not related to business and therefore that the recipient can ignore it if desired.
- NWS, meaning Not Work-Safe or Not Work-Suitable. Used in corporate emails to indicate that the content may be sexually explicit or profane, helping the recipient to avoid potentially objectionable material. The wisdom of sending a corporate email containing explicit material is left unexamined.
- NYR, meaning Need Your Response. Meaning requires a response.
- NYRT, meaning Need Your Response Today. Meaning requires a response this working day.
- NYRQ, meaning Need Your Response Quick. Meaning requires an immediate response.
- NYR-NBD, meaning Need Your Response - Next Business Day. Meaning requires a response before the end of the next working day.
- OoO, meaning Out of Office. Used in corporate emails to indicate that the sender will not be at work.
- PFA, meaning Please Find Attached / Attachment. Used in corporate emails to indicate that a document or set of documents is attached for the reference.
- PNFO, meaning Probably Not For the Office. Used in corporate emails to indicate that the content may be sexually explicit or profane, helping the recipient to avoid potentially objectionable material. The wisdom of sending a corporate email containing explicit material is left unexamined.
- PNSFW, meaning Probably Not Safe For Work or Possibly Not Safe For Work. Used in corporate emails to indicate that the content may be sexually explicit or profane, helping the recipient to avoid potentially objectionable material. The wisdom of sending a corporate email containing explicit material is left unexamined.
- PYR, meaning Per Your Request. The recipient is informed that the sender is replying to a previous email in which they were given a task.
- QUE, meaning Question. The recipient is informed that the sender wants an answer to this e-mail.
- RB, meaning Reply By. Used with a time indicator to inform the recipient that the sender needs a reply within a certain deadline, e.g. RB+7 meaning Reply By one week (7 days).
- RLB, meaning Read later. Used when sending personal or informational email to a business email address. Immediate response not required.
- RR, meaning Reply Requested or Reply Required. The recipient is informed that they should reply to this email.
- RSVP, meaning Reply Requested, please, from the French Répondez s'il vous plaît. The recipient is informed that they should reply to this email. Often used for replies (accept/decline) to invitations.
- SFW, meaning Safe For Work. Used in corporate emails to indicate that although the subject or content may look as if it is sexually explicit or profane, it is in fact not.
- SIM, meaning Subject Is Message. Used when the entire content of the email is contained in the subject and the body remains empty. This saves the recipient's time because they then do not have to open the email.
- SSIA, meaning Subject Says It All. Used when the entire content of the email is contained in the subject and the body remains empty. This saves the recipient's time because they then do not have to open the email. A [1] at the start of the subject line, meaning "one-liner", means the same. Also EOM, above.
- TLTR, meaning Too Long to read. Used in some corporate emails to request that the email sender re-writes the email body shorter.
- TBF, meaning (1) To be Forwarded. Used in some corporate emails to request that the email receiver should forward the mail to someone else. It also has the more common meaning (2) To be Frank/Fair. Usually only used in the email body.
- TSFW, meaning Technically Safe For Work or Totally Safe For Work. Used in corporate emails to indicate that although the subject or content may look as if it is sexually explicit or profane, it is in fact not. The broader workplace behavior necessitating such a disclaimer is left unexamined.
- Y/N, meaning Yes/No. The recipient is informed that they should reply to this email with a simple yes or no answer, increasing the likelihood for the sender of getting a quick response.
- VSRE, meaning Very Short Reply Expected.
- UDA, meaning Urgent Document Attached

== Abbreviations in other languages ==
The email client will typically check for an existing "Re:" when deciding whether or not to add one in front of the subject. However, clients may use different abbreviations if the computer is set up for a non-English language, e.g. "AW:" for German, and this can mean that a conversation between two participants can build up convoluted subject lines like "Re: AW: Re: AW: ..". Whereas "Re:" stands for "re" in Latin (see Standard prefixes), it is often taken to mean "regarding", "reply" or "response" in English, and in most other languages, similarly, the abbreviation corresponds to the word for "response" or "reply."

To avoid the issue of convoluted subject lines mentioned earlier, email clients may have an option to force the use of the standard (RE) and English (FW) abbreviations even when all other features are presented in another language, or to recognize other forms.

Language	RE	FW
Arabic	رد	إعادة توجيه
Simplified Chinese	回复	转发
Traditional Chinese	回覆	轉寄
Danish	SV (Svar)	VS (Videresendt)
Dutch	Antw (Antwoord)	Doorst (Doorsturen)
Estonian	VS (Vastus)	ED (Edastatud)
Finnish	VS (Vastaus)	VL (Välitetty)
French	REF (Référence) or RE (Réponse) in Canada	TR (Transfert)
German	AW (Antwort)	WG (Weitergeleitet)
Greek	ΑΠ (Απάντηση) or ΣΧΕΤ (Σχετικό)	ΠΡΘ (Προωθημένο)
Hebrew	השב or תשובה	הועבר or העברה
Hungarian	Vá (Válasz)	Továbbítás
Italian	R or RIF (Riferimento)	I (Inoltro)
Icelandic	SV (Svara)	FS (Framsenda)
Indonesian	BLS (Balas)	TRS (Terusan)
Latvian	Atb. (Atbilde)	Pārs. (Pārsūtīts)
Norwegian	SV (Svar)	VS (Videresendt)
Swedish	SV (Svar)	VB (Vidarebefordrat)
Spanish	RE (Respuesta)	RV (Reenviado)
Portuguese	RES (Resposta)	ENC (Encaminhado)
Polish	Odp (Odpowiedź)	PD (Podaj dalej)
Tamil	பதில்	முன்னனுப்பு
Turkish	YNT (Yanıt)	İLT (İlet)
Welsh	ATB (Ateb)	YML (Ymlaen)

== See also ==
- Internet slang (list)
- Internet slang
- Emoticon
- Threaded discussion
- PFA Full Form In Mail
