= Ånn =

Village in Åre Municipality, Sweden

Coordinates: 63°19′30″N 12°32′2″E

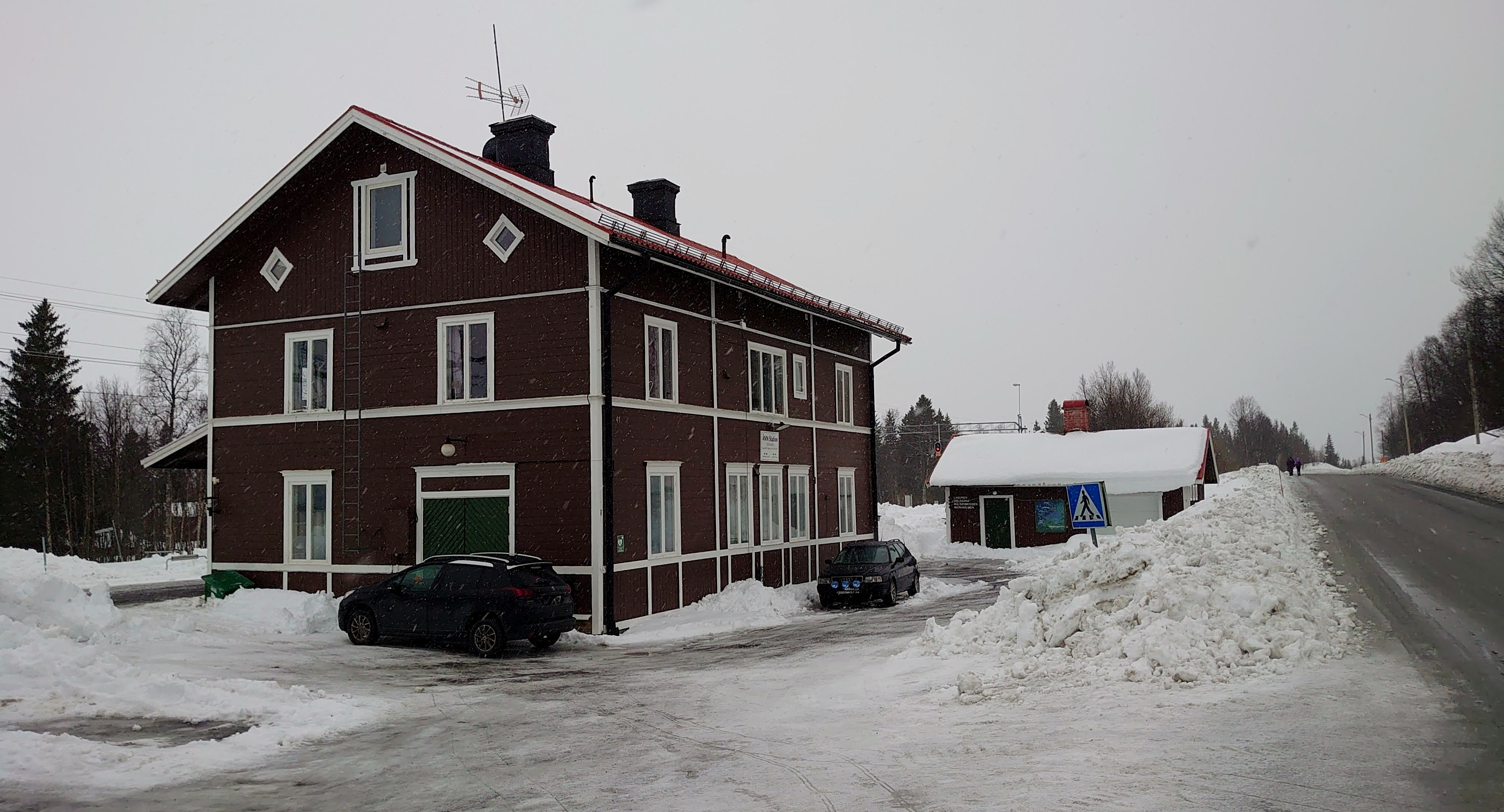
Ånn

Ånn is a village in Åre Municipality, Jämtland, Sweden. Located about 30 kilometres (19 mi) from the Norwegian border, both the Middle Line and European Route E14 pass through the village. In 2005, Ånn had 70 residents.
