= John Andrew Doyle =

British historian (1844–1907)

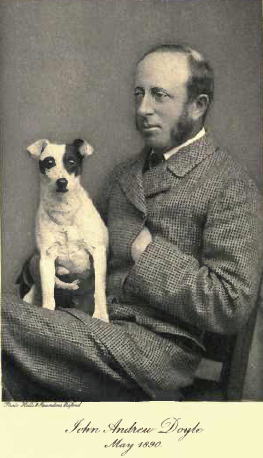

John Andrew Doyle, DL (14 May 1844 – 4 August 1907) was an English historian, the son of Andrew Doyle, editor of The Morning Chronicle.

He was educated at Eton and at Balliol College, Oxford, winning the Arnold prize in 1868 for his essay, The American Colonies and elected President of the Oxford Union in 1870. He was a fellow of All Souls from 1870 until his death, which occurred at Crickhowell, Wales, on 4 August 1907. He inherited the estate of his grandfather Sir John Easthope, 1st Baronet.

His principal work was The English Colonies in America, in five volumes, as follows: Virginia, Maryland and the Carolinas (1 volume, 1882), The Puritan Colonies (2 volumes, i886), The Middle Colonies (1 volume, 1907), and The Colonies under the House of Hanover (1 volume, 1907), the whole work dealing with the history of the colonies from 1607 to 1759. Doyle also wrote chapters i., ii., v. and vii. of volume vii. of the Cambridge Modern History, and edited William Bradford's History of the Plimouth Plantation (1896) and the Correspondence of Susan Ferrier (1898).

Doyle was appointed a Deputy Lieutenant for Brecknockshire on 8 January 1900. He enjoyed sports, was outstanding in the sport of rifle shooting, and frequently attended Wimbledon and Bisley. One of the earliest members of the kennel club, he bred and judged fox-terriers and was also an acknowledged expert on thoroughbred race horses.
