= William Birch (painter) =

English painter and landscape designer (1755–1834)

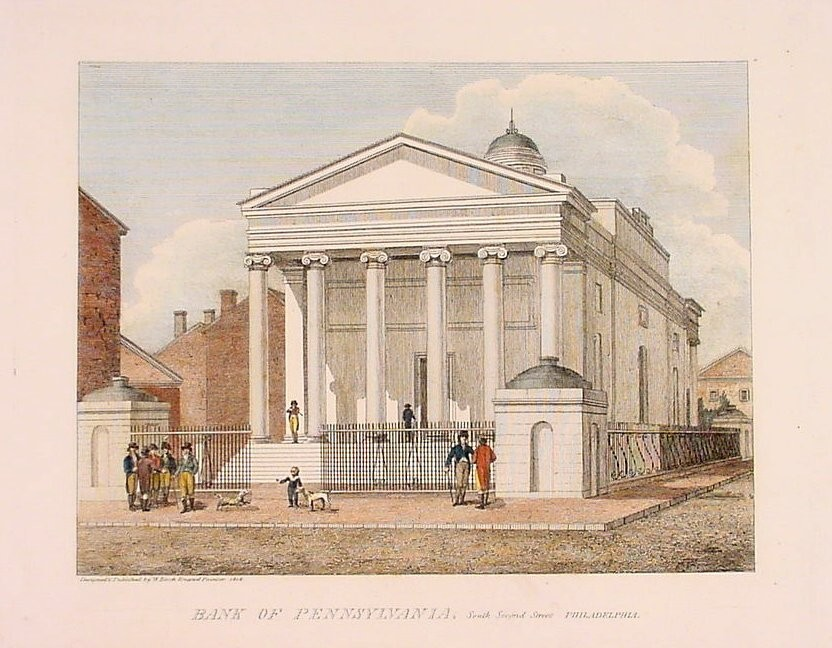
Benjamin Henry Latrobe's Bank of Pennsylvania, from the 4th edition of William Birch's Views of Philadelphia, 1827–1828

William Russell Birch (9 April 1755 – 7 August 1834) was an English miniature painter, enameler, and landscape engraver and designer.

== Early life and education ==
Birch was born in Warwickshire, the son of Anne, née Russell, and physician Thomas Birch. He spent his early childhood in Warwick and was apprenticed to a jeweler, Thomas Jeffreys, and to Sir Joshua Reynolds. The enamelist Henry Spicer trained Birch in the art of enamel painting. Birch exhibited enamel portraits at the Royal Academy from 1781 to 1794. In 1785, he received a medal from the Royal Society of Arts.

== Career ==
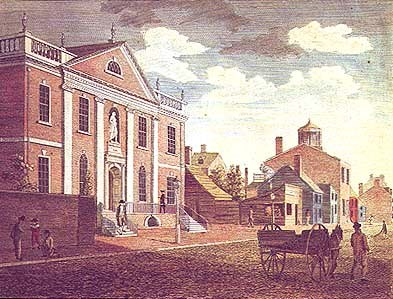
Library and Surgeon's Hall, an 1800 engraving by Birch of the Library Company of Philadelphia, the first American library founded by Benjamin Franklin

As an engraver he is best known in England for his Délices de la Grande Bretagne, consisting of thirty-six plates of ancient buildings in Norwich and elsewhere, published in 1791.

After emigrating to Philadelphia in 1794 he made portrait enamels of many people including copies of portraits of George Washington, by Gilbert Stuart. The engraving series he made in 1800 of Philadelphia vistas was so popular that it resulted in three additional editions. William Birch was the father of Thomas Birch, an American portrait and marine painter. Typescript copies of his autobiography are held by the Historical Society of Pennsylvania. He died in Philadelphia, aged 79.

== Works ==
- The City of Philadelphia, in the State of Pennsylvania North America. Philadelphia, 1800
- The Country Seats of the United States, 1808
- Enamel according to Gilbert Stuart of George Washington, at the Lazaro Galdiano Museum, Madrid.
