= Lake Ann =

Lake Ann may refer to one of several locations in the United States:

== Lakes ==
- Lake Ann (Arkansas)
- Lake Ann (Michigan)
- Lake Ann (Minnesota)
- Lake Ann (Texas)
- Lake Ann (Washington)

== Towns and other settlements ==
- Lake Ann, Michigan

== See also ==
- Lake Anne, Fairfax County, Virginia
- Lake Anna, Louisa and Spotsylvania counties, Virginia
