= Fort Ann, California =

Coordinates: 38.488°N 120.629°W

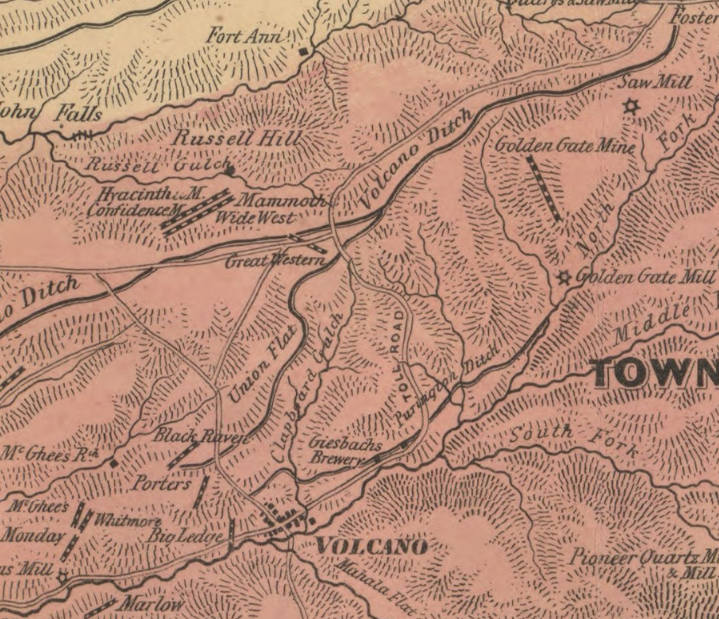
The mining settlement at Fort Ann appears near the top of this excerpt from the official 1866 map of Amador County.

Fort Ann is a former gold mining camp in Amador County, California, United States. It was located on the South Fork of Dry Creek, 3.5 miles (5.6 km) north of Volcano. Although local tradition has it that Fort Ann began as a military outpost, it began as a mining camp.

The camp was in place by 1852. Mining occurred in the original camp's vicinity, with some gaps in time, until at least 1941, with people living in the settlement. The camp appeared on the 1866 county map. Evidence of the camp and living quarters was reported to still be visible in 1967.
