= John Romeyn Brodhead =

American historical scholar (1814–1873)

- Born: January 2, 1814; Philadelphia, Pennsylvania, U.S.
- Died: May 6, 1873 (aged 59); New York City, U.S.
- Occupation: Historical scholar

Academic background
- Education: Rutgers College

John Romeyn Brodhead (January 2, 1814 – May 6, 1873) was an American historical scholar. During his service in the diplomatic corps, he transcribed many rare documents related to the colonial history of New York.

== Biography ==
=== Early life ===
John Romeyn Brodhead was born in Philadelphia, Pennsylvania, the son of Jacob Brodhead (1782–1855), a prominent clergyman of the Dutch Reformed Church. He was named after his uncle, Presbyterian clergyman, John Brodhead Romeyn.

He was descended from one Captain Daniel Brodhead, a soldier from Yorkshire, who, after the English acquired New Netherland, was in command of the garrison at Esopus. His grandfather was Captain Charles W. Brodhead, who was present at the surrender of Burgoyne at Saratoga in 1777.

The family moved to New York City when he was twelve years old. Brodhead graduated from Rutgers College in 1831 at the age of seventeen. (Rutgers was established in 1766 as "Queen's College" by Dutch Reformed ministers.) In 1835 was admitted to the bar in New York City. After 1837, however, he devoted himself principally to the study of the history of early New York. When his father's health began to fail, he retired to Saugerties, New York, and as the only surviving son, John accompanied him.

=== The Hague ===
President Martin Van Buren of Kinderhook, New York appointed his friend, Albany lawyer and former congressman Harmanus Bleecker to the post of Chargé d'Affaires to the Netherlands. Both were from old Dutch families and interested in Dutch language and culture. As Bleecker was fluent in old-style Dutch and familiar with Dutch customs, he was well received in the Netherlands.

On arriving at his post, Bleeker discovered that he was not provided with a secretary to assist with correspondence and scheduling. As he was related to Brodhead's mother, he offered the position to John. Bleeker was not allocated any funds for a clerk but apart from a small salary, an attaché of the legation would be in society and have the opportunity of learning German, Dutch, and French. Bleecker was also a highly regarded teacher in the law, and offered instruction in general law and jurisprudence.

With his father's approval, Brodhead accepted. He booked a passage on the steamer President but was unable to arrive in time for boarding. The ship sailed without him and was never heard of again. Thereafter, Brodhead preferred sailing ships.

He learned that in 1818, the old records of the Dutch West India company for the period prior to 1700 had been sold as scrap to paper mills. Nonetheless, his research in various European archives discovered a good deal material on the early history of New York. After diligent search he found many official documents preserved in other archives, such as the minutes of the States General.

The year 1809 had seen Washington Irving's satirical A History of New-York from the Beginning of the World to the End of the Dutch Dynasty, by Diedrich Knickerbocker. In 1829, the New York Historical Society published William Smith Jr.'s The History of the Province of New York: From Its Discovery to the Appointment of Governor Colden in 1762. Smith was a New Yorker, who did not consult Dutch-language sources directly, but did use some translations. According to historian Joseph Meany, Smith's presentation of the Dutch was not a balanced one.

The Board of Trustees of New York Historical Society included members of some of New York' s most prominent old Dutch families. At the urging of the New-York Historical Society, the state legislature appropriated funds to appoint an agent to gather and transcribe documents relating to New York's colonial history from various European archives. Brodhead was appointed (1841) by Governor William H Seward to undertake the work, and in four years gathered from England, France and the Netherlands some eighty manuscript volumes of transcriptions, largely of documents which had not hitherto been used by historians. According to historian J. Franklin Jameson, "[n]ever did an American state send out a better record-agent." Little escaped his search. During this time, he made the acquaintance of Edward Everett, American ambassador to the Court of St James's. He returned to New York in August, 1844.

These transcriptions were subsequently edited by Edward O'Callaghan (vols. i.-xi., md.) and by Berthold Fernow (vols xii.-xv., md.), and published by the state under the title Documents relating to the Colonial History of New York (15 vols., 1853–1883). Together they produced "...the single most important collection of primary documents on New York's colonial period."

=== London ===
In 1846, President James K. Polk appointed George Bancroft as minister to London. Gansevoort Melville, older brother of author Herman Melville, was secretary of the American legation in London, where he also served as his brother's literary agent. When Gansevoort died in May 1846, his boyhood friend John Brodhead, was appointed to succeed him, and also took on the role of Herman Melville's literary representative. During the unrest of the Chartist demonstrations, Brodhead was among many gentlemen sworn in as special constables. While posted to Great Britain, he also took the opportunity to take in performances on the London stage. With the election of Zachary Taylor as president, Bancroft's political appointment ended, and he and Brodhead returned to the United States in 1849.

=== Later life ===
From 1853 to 1857, he was naval officer of the port of New York. In 1855 he was asked by President Franklin Pierce to become Ambassador to Japan, a position he declined because he preferred to remain in New York.

He was an active member of both the New York Historical Society and the St. Nicholas Society, and a trustee of Rutgers College from 1853 to 1873. on November 27, 1856 he married Eugenia Bloodgood at Grace Church (Manhattan). In 1867 he was appointed a Trustee of the Astor Library.

He published several addresses and a scholarly History of the State of New York (2 vols., 1853–1871), sometimes considered the best for the brief period covered (1609-1690). When the first volume, which covers New Netherland, was published, George Bancroft wrote, "It is so full, so accurate, so marked by research and an honest love for historic truth, that we have only to bid him go and finish what he has so worthily begun."

He died of pneumonia in New York City on 6 May 1873 and was interred in the Trinity Church Cemetery in Upper Manhattan.

== Legacy ==
"The Jacob Brodhead Prize" is a prize of $100 from a fund given by Reverend Jacob Brodhead, D.D., and his son J. Romyn Brodhead, LL.D., awarded annually to a Rutgers student in her or his junior or senior year who displays all-around excellence in Classics.

== Bibliography ==
- Malone, Dumas (1932). Dictionary of American biography. Vol. III. New York: Charles Scribner's Sons.
