= List of storms named Ann =

The name Ann has been used for four tropical cyclones worldwide: three in the West Pacific Ocean and one in the Australian region.

In the West Pacific:

- Tropical Storm Ann (1945) – the first tropical cyclone to be officially named in the West Pacific.
- Tropical Storm Ann (1996) (T9602, 02W, Biring) – made landfall in the Philippines.
- Tropical Storm Ann (1999) (T9917, 23W) – a severe tropical storm that brought precipitation to multiple provinces in East China.

In the Australian region:

- Cyclone Ann (2019) – a Category 2 tropical cyclone that became the strongest May storm in the basin since Cyclone Rhonda in 1997
