= Announcement (computing) =

Software release announcement

An announcement (ANN) is a Usenet, mailing list or e-mail message sent to notify subscribers that a software project has made a new release version. Newsgroup announcement recipients often have a name like "comp.somegroup.announce". Mailing list announcement recipients often have a name like "toolname-announce". In an announcement, the subject line commonly contains the abbreviated prefix ANN: or [ANN].

The contents of an announcement usually contain a title line which contains the tool name, version, release name, and date. Additional contents often fall into the following message sections:

- About: a short paragraph summary of the tool's purpose
- Changes: a list of the highest impact changes since the last release (should be brief since the changelog comprises the definitive list)
- Resources: links to project pages of interest, such as homepage, where to download, bug tracking system, etc.

Some additional, optional fields might include "Highlights", "Author(s)", "License", "Requirements", and "Release History".

Announcement messages are usually sent in plain text form.

== Example ==
Example announcement message subject line:

ANN: fooutils 0.9.42 beta released

Example announcement message contents:

 ==============================================
  Fooutils 0.9.42 Beta Released -- 2006 Feb 16
 ==============================================

 ANNOUNCING Fooutils v0.2.12beta, the first beta release.

 About Fooutils
 --------------
 Fooutils are a set of utilities that...

 Changes
 -------
 Improved the searching facility by including...
 Fixed bugs: #123, #456, ...

 Resources
 ---------
 Homepage:
   http://fooutils.org

 Documentation:
   http://fooutils.org/docs

 Download:
   http://fooutils.org/download

 Bug Tracker:
   http://fooutils.org/newticket

 Mailing Lists:
   http://lists.fooutils.org/

== See also ==
- List of e-mail subject abbreviations
