= Samuel Blommaert =

Merchant from the Netherlands

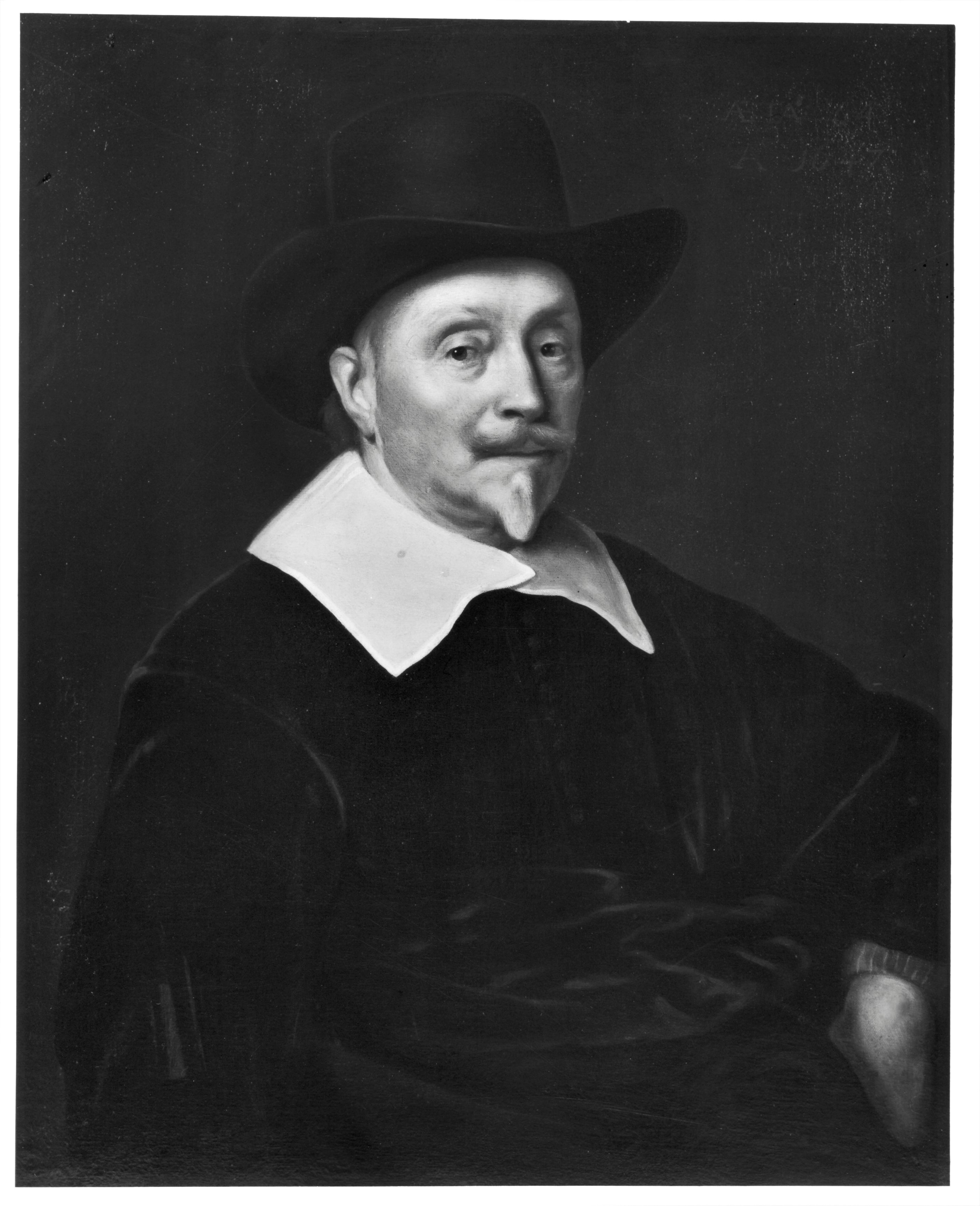
- Samuel Blommaert (1647)

Signature
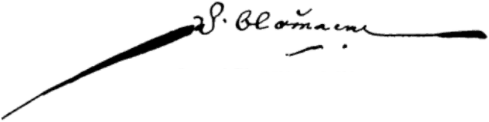

Samuel Blommaert (Bloemaert, Blommaerts, Blommaart, Blomert, etc.; 11 or 21 August 1583 – 23 December 1651) was a Flemish-Dutch merchant and director of the Dutch West India Company (WIC) from 1622 to 1629 and again from 1636 to 1642. In the latter period, he was a paid commissioner of Sweden in the Netherlands and he played a dubious but key role in Peter Minuit's expedition that led to the Swedish colonisation of New Sweden (present-day United States). For years Blommaert was involved in the copper trade and industry. In 1645 he was appointed for a third time as a manager of the WIC, being one of the main investors from the beginning.

== Early life ==
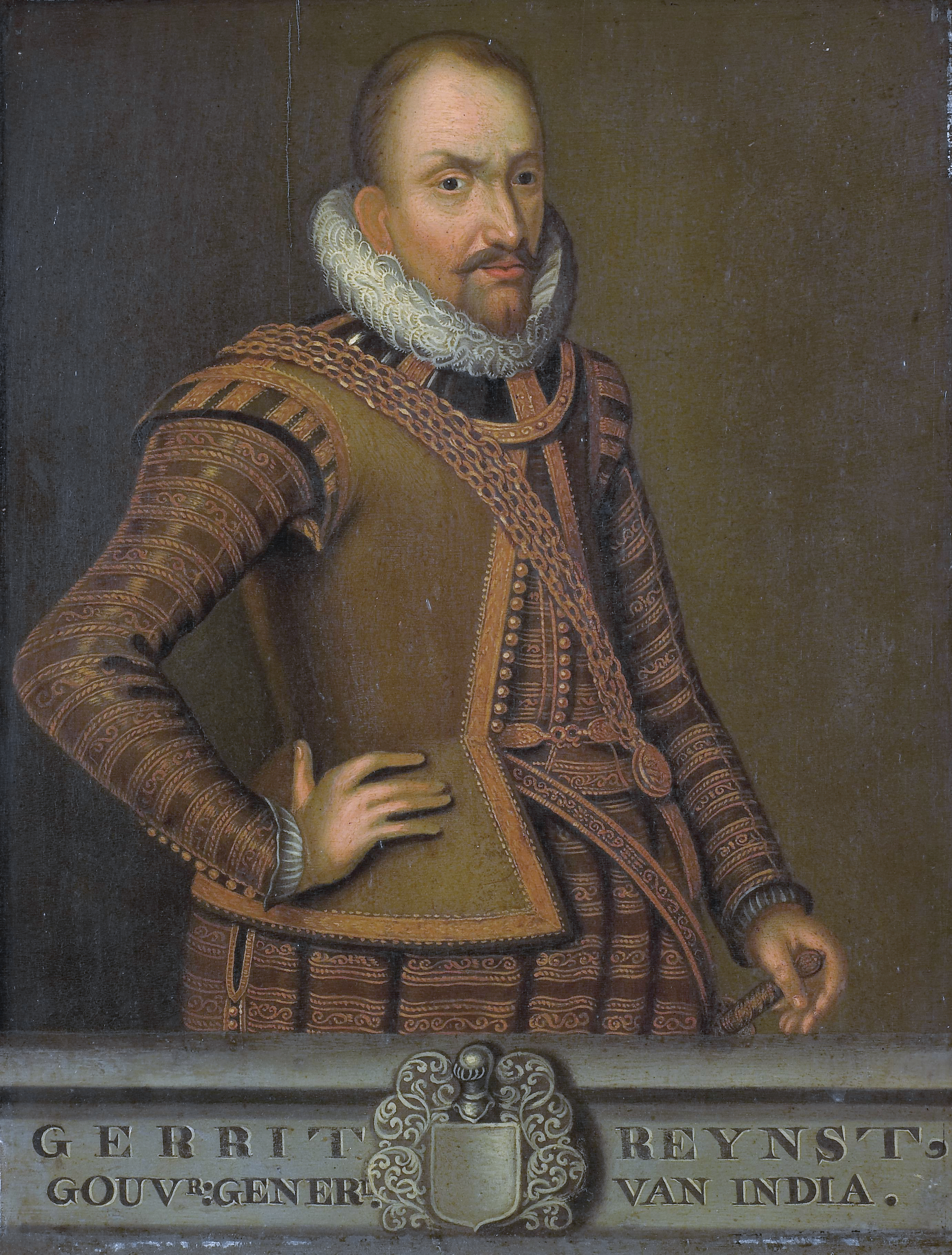
Portrait of Gerard Reynst, Blommaert's father-in-law

Blommaert was born in Antwerp, Duchy of Brabant, in current-day Belgium but grew up in London. He was the son of Margaretha Hoefnagel (–1585) (Note: Her grandfather was Joris Hoefnagel was, the court-painter and diplomat Jacob Hoefnagel was her father; Constantijn Huygens was her uncle. In: Brieven van Samuel Blommaert aan den Zweedschen rijkskanselier Axel Oxenstierna, 1635-1641. Joris Hoefnagel was a diplomat supporting Frederick V, Elector Palatine and accused in Prague of fraudulently dealing with a certain financial matter. Hoefnagel was convicted in absentia in a political process of embezzlement of funds. All his goods were confiscated he was sentenced to death but fled to Sweden?) and the wealthy goldsmith/merchant Lodewijk Blommaert (1537–1591), who in 1581 was schepen of Antwerp and in 1583 captain at Fort Lillo on the eastern border of the Scheldt; he knew the area very well as his ancestors came from Bergen-op-Zoom. His mother died when Samuel was young and his father moved the family to London when Antwerp was occupied in 1585 by the Duke of Parma. In 1587 he remarried Janneken van Hove but he died four years later. Samuel was apprenticed in Stade with his aunt Susanne, and in Vienna at his uncle Daniel. In 1601 he became "poorter" of Amsterdam. In 1602 he visited Benin.

In 1603, Samuel enlisted with the Dutch East India Company (VOC) and travelled to the Dutch East Indies on a ship under admiral Steven van der Hagen. In the years 1605–1607 he stayed on Borneo. He was sent by the board (Jacques l'Hermite) to Sukadana West Kalimantan to free merchant Hans Roeff, who had died or left when Blommaert arrived. He returned to Bantam with 633 diamonds he was able to save at the trading post. In 1609/1610 he again stayed on Sambas, Borneo and was able to get a monopoly on diamond trade for the VOC. In September 1610, after seven years, he left sooner than expected and arrived in June 1611 at Texel. Pieter Both had to investigate the case. On 5 June 1612, he married the 22-years-old Catharina Reynst, a daughter of Gerard Reynst, governor of the East Indies. Both were living at Sint Antoniesbreestraat with whom he would have twelve children between 1613 and 1633; two died in an early age.

== Early career ==
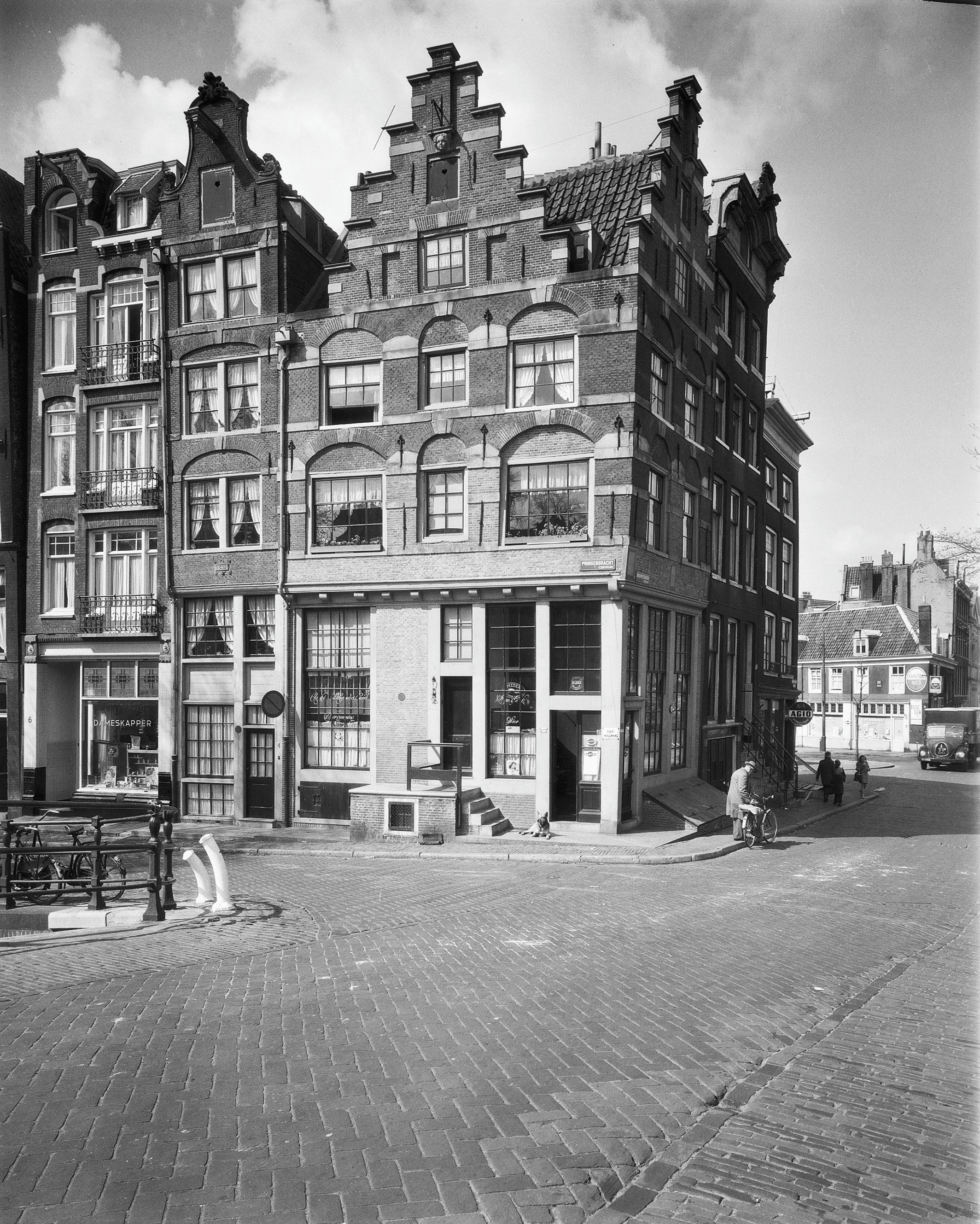
In 1615 Gerrit Reynst became the owner of an empty lot, now Prinsengracht 2; his heirs, two daughters who married Samuel Blommaert and Isaac Coymans sold the lots in 1617, 1618, and 1622.

For many years Blommaert was involved in a company which traded in copper from Angola and the African coast, together with Frans Jacobsz. Hinlopen, and Lucas van der Venne. In 1615 Jacob le Maire carried a letter from his father Isaac le Maire to be presented to Governor Reynst, with an offer to smuggle goods to his son-in-law in Amsterdam. Blommaert was investigated in Amsterdam by the board of the VOC on 30 January 1616 about a vessel, named Mauritius de Nassau, sailed from a Dutch port, under the command of Jan Remmertszoon from Purmerend. The ship was ostensibly destined for Angola, but from there she was ordered to direct her course for "Terra Australis." The plan, therefore, was, from the west coast of Africa to sail southward to Tierra del Fuego, and then

"to explore the whole of the coast : as far as the Strait of Magellanes, on the chance of finding an opening that might allow a passage to the South-sea; and on such opening being found, to run into and through the same, in order to discover whether they could in such manner get into the South-sea; should such passage to the South-sea have been found, they had orders to return home forthwith, but in case adverse circumstances should prevent them from doing so, they were to run on for the East Indies."

Around 1619, he bought a lot of 9.1 m × 51.8 m (30 ft × 170 ft) on the Keizersgracht, where a new house was built, and he settled next to Laurens Reael. In 1620, Isaac Coymans, a broker, became his brother-in-law.

== New Netherland ==
The relative locations of New Netherland (magenta) and New Sweden (blue); modern US-state boundaries and postal abbreviations are shown

By 1621, he invested in the Amsterdam chamber of the WIC and was appointed director in October 1622. In 1623, he and Kiliaen van Rensselaer, Samuel Godijn, and Albert Coenraetsz. Burgh were investigating the possibility of the slave trade in Angola. In 1624 his grandfather Jacob Hoefnagel became one of the three mayors in Gothenburg and president of the court of justice for a while. Louis de Geer received the official monopoly on the copper and iron trade in Sweden and decided to settle there. In 1627 Blommaert had an argument with Pieter Trip about 34 Swedish guns.

In 1628 he collaborated with Van Rensselaer, Godijn, and Burgh, to send two persons to New Netherland (present-day United States) to inspect the land. Gilles Housset and Jacob Jansz Cuyper bargained with the natives for a tract of land reaching from Cape Henlopen to the mouth of the Delaware River. This was in 1629, three years before the charter of Maryland, and is the oldest deed for land in the state of Delaware. The purchase was ratified in 1630 by Peter Minuit and his council at Fort Amsterdam.

A company was formed to colonise the tract that included Blommaert, Godin, Van Rensselaer, Joannes de Laet (a geographer), and David Pietersz. de Vries. A ship of eighteen guns was fitted out to bring over the colonists and subsequently defend the coast, with incidental whale-fishing to help defray expenses. A colony of more than thirty souls was planted on Lewes creek, a little north of Cape Henlopen, and its governorship was entrusted to Gilles Housset. This settlement antedated by several years any in Pennsylvania, and the colony at Lewes practically laid the foundation and defined the singularly limited area of the state of Delaware, the major part of which was included in the purchase. A palisaded fort was built, with the "red lion, rampant," of Holland affixed to its gate, and the country was named "Swaanendael" or Zwaanendael Colony, while the water was called Godyn's Bay. The estate was further extended, on 5 May 1630, by the purchase of a tract twelve miles square on the coast of Cape May opposite, and the transaction was duly attested at Fort Amsterdam.

The existence of the little colony was short, for the Indians came down upon it in revenge for an arbitrary act on the part of Housset, and it was destroyed, not a soul escaping to tell the tale. According to acknowledged precedent, occupancy of the wilderness served to perfect title; but before the Dutch could reoccupy the desolated site at Lewes, the English were practically in possession.

== New Sweden ==
Because of the ongoing Polish–Swedish War (1626–1629), no grain could be exported through the city of Dantzig. In 1630 the price of grain remained extremely high due to increasing competition. Albert Burgh tried to ensure a monopoly for the City of Amsterdam in Moscovy. In 1631 Blommaert bought rye in Arkhangelsk. Isaac Coymans, his brother-in-law, moved all his furniture to Keizersgracht 139 as Coymans was in trouble for embezzlement. In 1631 De Geer had a disagreement with his partner Elias Trip. The quarrel was resolved in 1634.

In 1635, he started a brass factory in Nacka, outside Stockholm, to boost the export of copper which could be used for making guns and coins. Blommaert tried to attract workers and experts from Aachen and Stolberg. In 1636, Blommaert was reappointed as "bewindhebber" of the WIC after its first bankruptcy, but also became the consul for Sweden in Amsterdam. In 1636 the directors of the WIC could not gather because of an outbreak of plague. In 1637 Blommaert secretly invested money in the first Swedish expedition with Fogel Grip and Kalmar Nyckel to New Sweden. By doing so, he hoped to avoid paying the Dano-Norwegian Sound Tolls on all foreign merchantmen crossing the Sound. He engaged the former diamond cutter Peter Minuit to command the expedition, without the knowledge or permission of the WIC. (Note: Minuit was dismissed by the WIC in 1632.) Blommaert suggested to Oxenstierna to take part in the WIC, and organise from Gothenburg and trade on Spanish and Portuguese ports. (Note: In 1649 Louis de Geer founded the Swedish Africa Company which led outraged citizens in Amsterdam to riot and in 1650 Christina, Queen of Sweden hired Hendrik Carloff to improve trade on Gold Coast.) Blommaert was interested in seizing Spanish ships, which sailed from the East or West-Indies to Cádiz or Seville, to make his expeditions and colonisation more profitable.

In November 1637 two ships belonging to the Swedish South Company with crew and settlers left Gothenburg. Because of a storm the ships could get around Scotland; after a month at sea one arrived at Texel, the other at Medemblik. The damage was provisionally repaired; sails and victuals (butter, bread, and beer) needed to be bought. Having arrived on Swedes' Landing on 29 March Minuit acted as he had done before, he did not conquer the land by force but bought it legally from the Lenape or Minqua Indians. What happened next is not very clear. (It seems he was hardly involved in building Fort Christina). Minuit left the colony mid-June 1638, and sailed to the Caribbean island of St. Christopher where he arrived in early July to barter salt, a ship's cargo of wine and liquor for tobacco. (Meanwhile Cornelis Jol attempted to capture the Spanish treasure fleet near Cuba with four ships but didn't succeed to the disappointment of Blommaert.) On 5 August 1638 Minuit drowned during a hurricane at St. Christopher (today's St. Kitts). About 20 ships drifted out of the harbour. One ship sank near the Azores, the Kalmar arrived without a mast. A second voyage, which departed on 7 February 1640, and arrived at Fort Christina on 17 April, brought additional settlers for New Sweden. As the two expeditions turned out to be unprofitable for Blommaert, he withdrew in 1641.

In 1639, Blommaert and Isaac Coymans sold tobacco and sugar; they were accused of cheating as there were a couple of stones in one of the cases and problems with the tobacco. In 1640, Portuguese Restoration War improved the situation for the Dutch. Blommaert was involved in mining in Dutch Brazil. In 1641, the Zwaanendael Colony was sold to Sweden; all the participants agreed on an equal share. A ship with 211 slaves arrived in Brazil. In 1642 with collaborated with Jan Valkenburgh in Angola. In 1647 he and his wife were portrayed. He told professor Nicolaes Tulp, stories on bestiality he heard on Borneo. In 1651 Blommaert got ill. He died in Amsterdam on 23 December 1651 and was buried in the Westerkerk. In 1655 his daughter Constantia (born 1626) married the admiral Isaac Sweers, Catharina married Abraham Elzevir, and Anna moved to Malakka with her husband, director of the VOC.

== Legacy ==
Blommaert's thirty-eight letters to Axel Oxenstierna from 1635 to 1641 are of great importance to the history of New Sweden. They mention Willem Usselincx one of the founders of the WIC, who had moved to Gothenburg in 1624 and founded the Swedish South Company; Peter Spiring dealt with the Dutch merchants. These letters were published in Repertorium Veterrimarum Societatum Litterariarum 1870–1879 of the Utrecht Historical Society and in Bijdragen en Mededeelingen (1908).

== Primary source ==
- Jameson, J. F. editor. Narrative of New Netherland 1609–1664 (Project Gutenberg – from the series: Original narratives of early American history. Original Printing 1909) Wayback Machine
