= Territorial evolution of North America prior to 1763 =

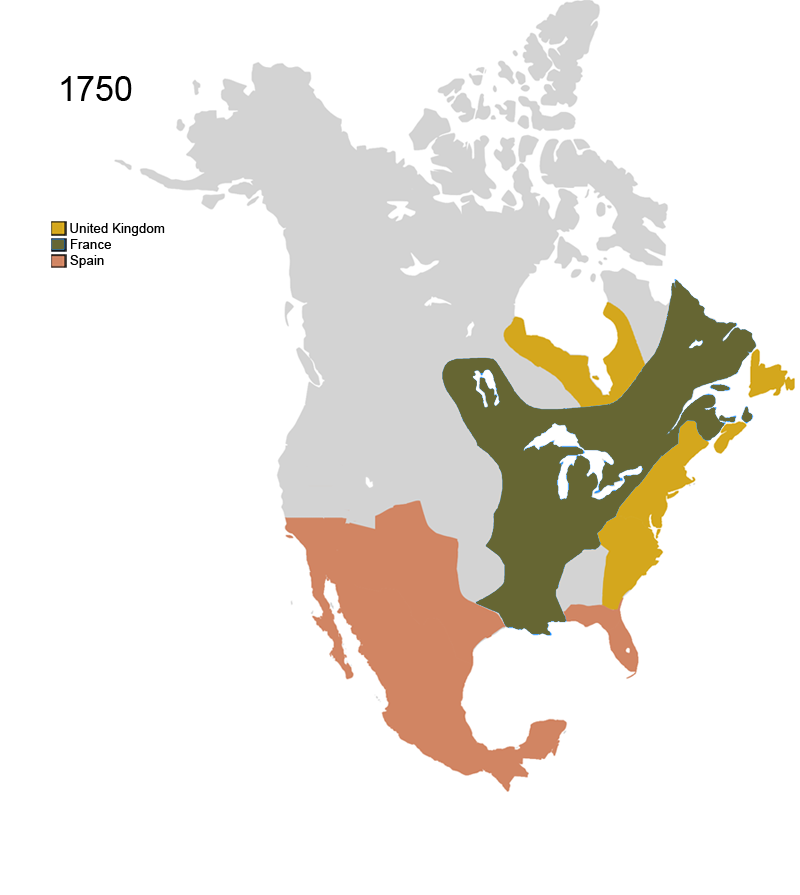
European territorial claims over North America around 1750

Before contact with Europeans, the natives of North America were divided into many different polities, from small bands of a few families to large empires. Modern anthropology assigns some larger divisions into various "culture areas", regions within which a particular set of cultural, political, subsistence and/or linguistic traits predominated. These pre-Columbian American culture areas may also roughly correspond to particular geographic and biological zones of the continent. During the thousands of years of native inhabitation on the continent, cultures changed and shifted. One of the oldest cultures yet found is that of the Clovis peoples. Upon the arrival of the Europeans in the "New World", Native American population declined substantially, primarily due to the introduction of European diseases to which the Native Americans lacked immunity.

There was limited contact between North American people and the outside world before 1492. Several theoretical contacts have been proposed, but the earliest physical evidence comes from the Norse or Vikings. Norse captain Leif Ericson is believed to have reached the Island of Newfoundland circa 1000 AD. In 1492 Columbus reached land in the Bahamas. Almost 500 years after the Norse, John Cabot explored the east coast of what would become Canada in 1497. Giovanni da Verrazzano explored the East Coast of North America from Florida to presumably Newfoundland in 1524. Jacques Cartier made a series of voyages on behalf of the French crown in 1534 and penetrated the St. Lawrence River. These powers slowly replaced the native nations of the North American east coast and then spread into the interior. The main powers in North America frequently fought over territory. One of the biggest wars was the French and Indian War that ended in France leaving the continent and giving up its claims in the Treaty of Paris. After 1763 a new power emerged, the independent United States of America.

== c. 1003 ==
Norse captain Leif Erikson is believed to have reached the Island of Newfoundland c. 1000 AD. They established a colony on 1003 at L'Anse aux Meadows and later abandoned the site.

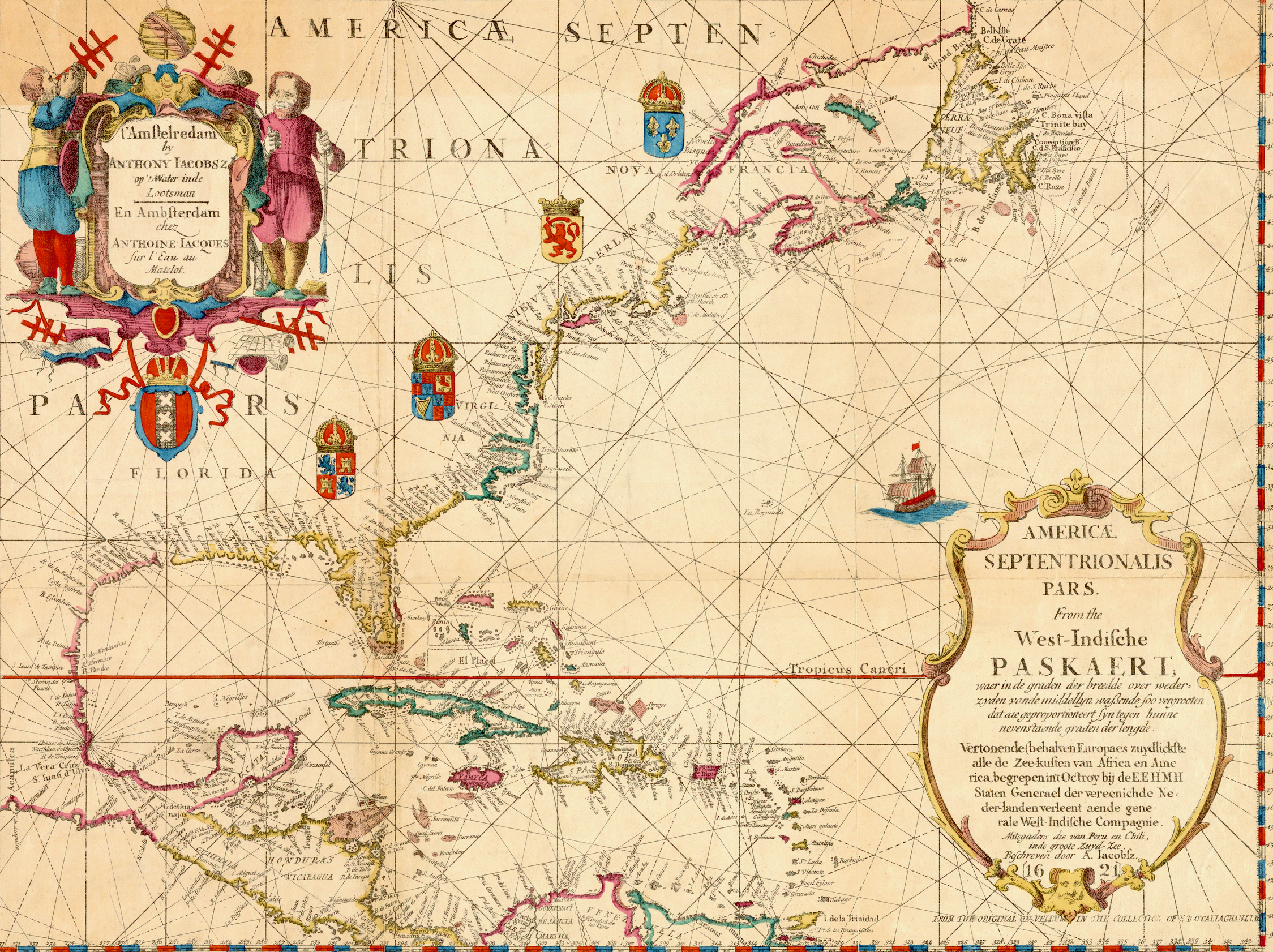
Map of North America (1621).

== 1494 ==
The Treaty of Tordesillas was signed on June 7, 1494, and ratified by Spain and Portugal on July 2 and September 5, 1494, respectively. The Treaty divided the newly discovered lands outside Europe between Spain and Portugal along a meridian 370 leagues west of the Cape Verde islands off the west coast of Africa. There was great confusion around the implementation of the Treaty.

== 1513 ==
The Spanish claims on the Pacific coast, based on a 1493 papal bull which had granted Spain the rights to colonize the western coast of North America, allowed Vasco Núñez de Balboa to claim all of the "South Sea" (the Pacific Ocean) and the lands adjoining the Pacific Ocean for the Spanish Crown.

== August 13, 1521 ==
The Aztec Triple Alliance fell into Spanish hands after the long Siege of Tenochtitlan when Tenochtitlan and Tlatelolco fell on August 13, 1521, after the last Aztec emperor, Cuauhtémoc, surrendered to Cortés.

== 1546 ==
The Spanish completed their conquest of Yucatán with the help of their Xiu allies in 1546, although various Maya peoples were never completely conquered and would revolt throughout Spanish rule.

== 1559 ==
In 1559 Tristán de Luna y Arellano established a brief settlement in Pensacola.

== 1561 ==
A hurricane struck Florida and forced the abandonment of the Pensacola settlement in 1561.

== 1564 ==
René Goulaine de Laudonnière founded Fort Caroline in what is now Jacksonville in 1564 as a haven for the Huguenots.

== 1565 ==
September 20, 1565

Menéndez de Avilés attacked Fort Caroline, killing all the French Huguenot soldiers defending it (sparing only a few Catholics), and renamed the fort San Mateo.

1565

Further down the coast in Florida, the Spanish founded in 1565 by Pedro Menéndez de Avilés, San Agustín (St. Augustine) became the oldest continuously inhabited European settlement in any State of the United States. This is the second oldest settlement, following only San Juan, Puerto Rico, in the current territory and possessions of the United States. From this base of operation, Spanish missionaries began building Roman Catholic missions in Florida.

== 1585 ==
Under the supervision of Sir Walter Raleigh in 1585, a colonizing expedition composed solely of men, many of them veteran soldiers who had fought to establish the British rule in Ireland, was sent to establish a colony in Virginia. With about 75 men, Raleigh decided to establish the English colony at the northern end of Roanoke Island. The British ships disembarked on August 17, 1585, leaving the isolated men to form a colony.

== 1590 ==
The initial colony was abandoned but a second attempt led by John White, an artist and friend of Sir Walter Raleigh who had accompanied the previous expeditions to Roanoke, was sent out. After problems with the colony mounted they sent White back to England for help due to the continuing war with Spain ( Anglo-Spanish War (1585) ), White was not able to mount another resupply attempt for three more years. He finally gained passage on a privateering expedition that agreed to stop off at Roanoke on the way back from the Caribbean. White landed on August 18, 1590, on his granddaughter's third birthday, but found the settlement deserted. His men could not find any trace of the ninety men, seventeen women, and eleven children, nor was there any sign of a struggle or battle. The only clue was the word "Croatoan" carved into a post of the fort and "Cro" carved into a nearby tree.

== June 26, 1604 ==
The French settled at a site in the Baie Francis (present day Bay of Fundy), at the mouth of the Saint Croix River which separates present day New Brunswick and Maine, on a small island named Saint Croix.

== 1607 ==
May 14, 1607

Jamestown was the first successful English settlement on the mainland of North America. Named for King James I of England, Jamestown was founded in the Virginia Colony on May 14, 1607

August 1607

Arriving in August 1607, these British Plymouth Company colonists established their settlement, known as the Popham Colony, in the present-day town of Phippsburg, Maine near the mouth of the Kennebec River.

== 1608 ==
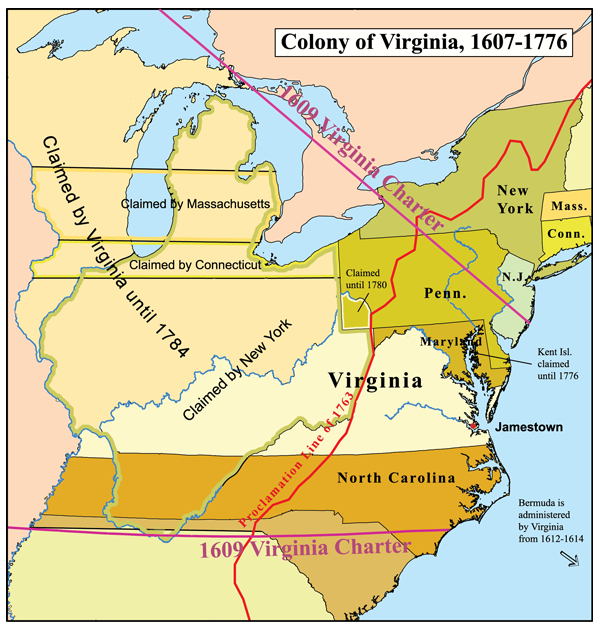
Virginia history

The Popham Colony colonists abandoned their colony leaving on the 30-ton ship, a pinnace they named Virginia. It was the first ship built in America by Europeans, and was meant to show that the colony could be used for shipbuilding. The short-lived colony had lasted about a year.

== 1613 ==
The earliest Dutch settlement was built around 1613, and consisted of a number of small huts built by the crew of the "Tijger" (Tiger), a Dutch ship under the command of Captain Adriaen Block which had caught fire while sailing on the Hudson. Soon after, the first of two Fort Nassaus was built and small factorijen, or trading posts, where commerce could be conducted with Algonquian and Iroquois population, went up (possibly at Schenectady, Schoharie, Esopus, Quinnipiac, Communipaw and elsewhere).

== 1620 ==
Pilgrim separatists landed at Plymouth Rock and formed the Plymouth Colony. Aided by Squanto, a Native American of the Patuxet people, the colony was able to establish a treaty with Chief Massasoit which helped to ensure the colony's success. The colony played a central role in King Philip's War, one of the earliest and bloodiest of the Indian Wars. Ultimately, the colony was annexed by the Massachusetts Bay Colony in 1691.

== 1629 ==
In 1629, the first Scottish settlement at Port Royal in the Bay of Fundy was established.

== 1631 ==
In 1631, under Charles I, the Scots were forced to abandon their Nova Scotia colony in its infancy.

== March 29, 1638 ==
The Swedish ships Fogel Grip and Kalmar Nyckel, sailed into Delaware Bay, which lay within the territory claimed by the Dutch, passing Cape May and Cape Henlopen in late March 1638, and anchored at a rocky point on the Minquas Kill that is known today as Swedes' Landing on March 29, 1638. They built a fort on the present site of the city of Wilmington, which they named Fort Christina, after Queen Christina of Sweden.

== 1654 ==
In 1654, war between France and England broke out. Led by Major Robert Sedgwick, a flotilla from Boston, under orders from Oliver Cromwell, arrived in Acadia to chase the French out. The flotilla seized La Tour's fort, then Port-Royal.

== September 15, 1655 ==
In May 1654, the Dutch Fort Casimir was captured by soldiers from the colony of New Sweden, led by Governor Johan Risingh. The fort was taken without a fight because its garrison did not have any gunpowder, and the fort was renamed Fort Trinity (in Swedish, Trefaldigheten).

As reprisal, the Dutch — led by Governor Peter Stuyvesant — moved an army to the Delaware River in the late summer of 1655, leading to the immediate surrender of Fort Trinity and Fort Christina. Thus the settlement was absorbed into the Dutch New Netherlands on September 15, 1655.

== 1663 ==
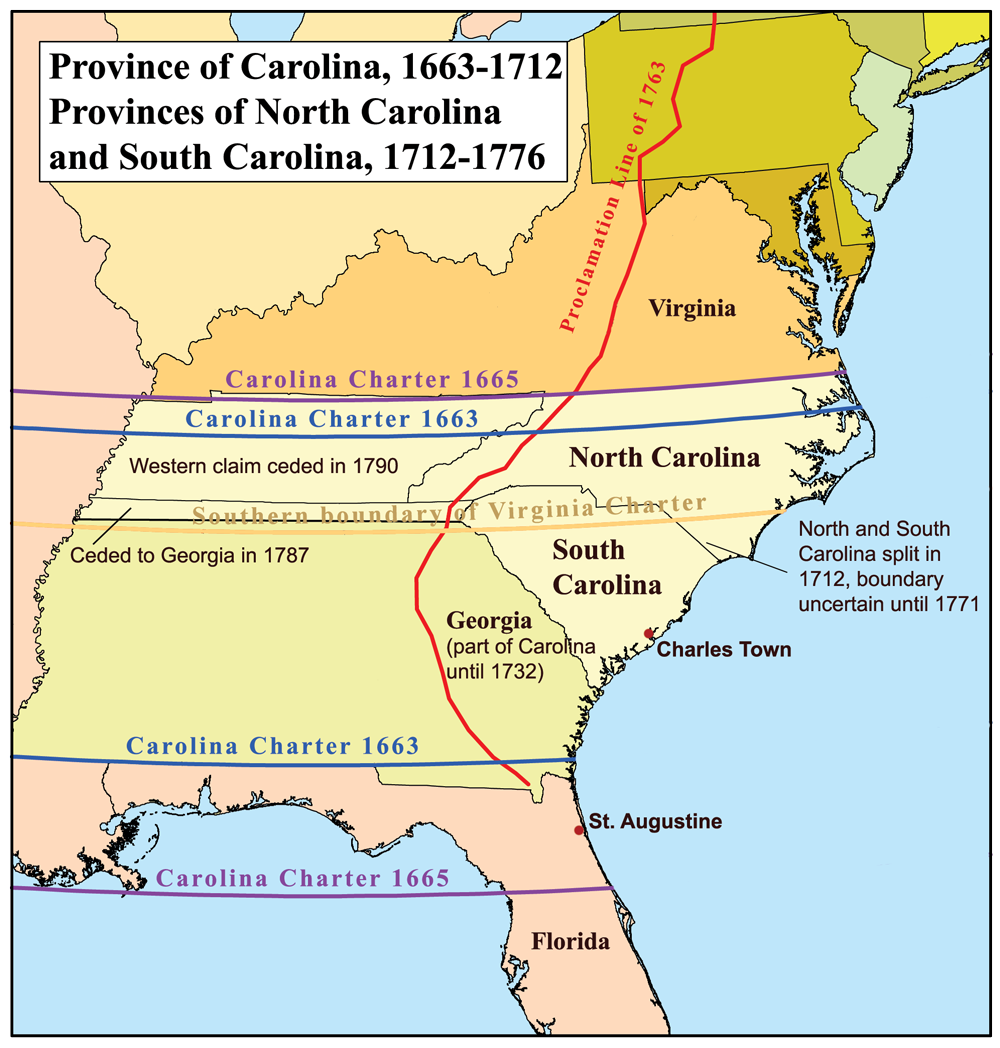

The 1663 Province of Carolina charter granted the Lords Proprietor title to all of the land from the southern border of the Virginia Colony at 36 degrees north to 31 degrees north (along the coast of present-day Georgia). In 1665, the charter was revised slightly, with the northerly boundary extended to 36 degrees 30 minutes north to include the lands of settlers along the Albemarle Sound who had left the Virginia Colony. Likewise, the southern boundary was moved south to 29 degrees north, just south of present-day Daytona Beach, Florida, which had the effect of including the existing Spanish settlement at St. Augustine. The charter also granted all the land, between these northerly and southerly bounds, from the Atlantic, westward to the shores of the Pacific Ocean.

== July 31, 1667 ==
A modern map which approximates the relative size and location of the settled areas of New Netherland and New Sweden, which was never officially recognized by the Dutch Republic

- In the 1667 Treaty of Breda ending the Second Anglo-Dutch War when the Dutch exchanged their claims on their North American colony of New Netherlands for the status quo, with the Dutch occupying Suriname and the nutmeg island of Run Island.
- Acadia returned to France via the Treaty of Breda, signed July 31, 1667. However, it took three years before the officials of the French Empire to take control of this land.

== 1673 ==
In August 1673, the Dutch recaptured New Netherlands with a fleet of 21 warships, the largest fleet that had ever been seen off the North American coast.

== 1674 ==
In November 1674, the Treaty of Westminster concluded the war and ceded New Netherland to the English.

== 1683 ==
The first settlement in Baja California, named San Bruno, was founded but it lasted only about two years before being abandoned.

== 1697 ==
In 1697, the first "permanent" mission in Baja California was established at Loreto, about 20 miles away from San Bruno, also on the east coast of the peninsula.

== April 11, 1713 ==
The Treaty of Utrecht was actually a group of documents. The treaties were among several European states, including France, Spain, Great Britain, Savoy, and the Dutch Republic, and they helped end the War of the Spanish Succession. In North America, France ceded to Great Britain its claims to the Hudson's Bay Company territories in Rupert's Land, Newfoundland and Acadia. France retained its other pre-war North American possessions, including Île-Saint-Jean (now Prince Edward Island) as well as Île Royale (now Cape Breton Island), on which it erected the Fortress of Louisbourg.

== 1719 ==
In 1719, the French captured the Spanish settlement at Pensacola, but the Spanish were able to retake the town. Then the Spanish lost it again later in the same year.

== 1722 ==
The French turned over the settlement of Pensacola to the Spanish in the Treaty of 1722.

== 1759 ==
Russians began to live in Unalaska on the Aleutian islands.

== See also ==
- Territorial evolution of the United States
- Territorial evolution of Canada
- Territorial evolution of Mexico
- Animated map of the Canada provinces evolution version 1
- Animated map of the Canada provinces evolution version 2
- Animated map of US states by date of statehood
- Animated map of Mexico

== Bibliography ==
Notes

- Bacci, Massimo Livi (2001). A concise history of world population (2001 ed.). Wiley-Blackwell. ISBN 0-631-22335-5. - Total pages: 251
- Bense, Judith Ann (1999). Archaeology of colonial Pensacola (1999 ed.). University Press of Florida. ISBN 0-8130-1661-4. - Total pages: 294
- Brown, Karen; Brown, Clare; Stevenson, Jane (2006). Karen Brown's Mexico: Exceptional Places to Stay and Itineraries (2006 ed.). Karen Brown's Guides. ISBN 1-933810-10-6. - Total pages: 407
- Bowen, Charles (1837). The American almanac and repository of useful knowledge (1837 ed.). Published by Charles Bowen. - Total pages: 340
- Hansen, Marcus Lee; Brebner, John Bartlet (1970). The mingling of the Canadian and American peoples: Vol. 1 (1970 ed.). Ayer Publishing. ISBN 0-405-00553-9. - Total pages: 274
- Haycox, Stephen W. (2002). Alaska: an American colony (2002 ed.). C. Hurst & Co. Publishers. ISBN 1-85065-677-0. - Total pages: 372
- Harrisse, Henry (1897). The diplomatic history of America: its first, Parts 1452-1494 (1897 ed.). B.F. Stevens. - Total pages: 230
- Jones, Oakah L. (1996). Los paisanos: Spanish settlers on the northern frontier of New Spain (1996 ed.). University of Oklahoma Press. ISBN 0-8061-2885-2. - Total pages: 351
- Kirkwood, J. Burton (2009). The History of Mexico (2009 ed.). ABC-CLIO. ISBN 978-0-313-36601-7. - Total pages: 266
- Litalien, Raymonde; Roth, Käthe; Vaugeois, Denis (2004). Champlain: the birth of French America (when ed.). McGill-Queen's University Press. ISBN 0-7735-2850-4. - Total pages: 397
- MacKay, Donald (1996). Scotland Farewell: The People of the Hector (1996 ed.). Dundurn Press Ltd. ISBN 1-896219-12-8. - Total pages: 236
- Munroe, John A. (1978). Colonial Delaware: a history (1978 ed.). KTO Press. ISBN 0-527-18711-9. - Total pages: 292
- Thorne, Kathryn Ford; Long, John Hamilton (1993). Atlas of historical county boundaries (1993 ed.). Simon & Schuster. ISBN 0-13-051962-6. - Total pages: 242
- Page, Melvin Eugene; Sonnenburg, Penny M. Colonialism: an international, social, cultural, and political encyclopedia, Volume 1 (2003 ed.). ABC-CLIO. ISBN 1-57607-335-1. - Total pages: 1208
- Reid, John G. (2004). The "conquest" of Acadia, 1710: imperial, colonial, and aboriginal constructions (2004 ed.). University of Toronto Press. ISBN 0-8020-8538-5. - Total pages: 297
- Rowland, Lawrence Sanders; Moore, Alexander; Rogers, George C. The History of Beaufort County, South Carolina: 1514-1861 (1996 ed.). University of South Carolina Press. ISBN 1-57003-090-1. - Total pages: 521
- Sharer, Robert J. (1994). The ancient Maya (1994 ed.). Stanford University Press. ISBN 0-8047-2130-0. - Total pages: 892
- Stejneger, Leonhard (2009). Bering's Voyages, Volume 2 (2009 ed.). BiblioBazaar, LLC. ISBN 978-1-116-11439-3. - Total pages: 326
- Wharton, Edith (1821). The North American review, Volume 13 (1821 ed.). O. Everett. - Total pages: 514
