= New Amsterdam judicial system =

Dutch colonial legal system

The New Amsterdam judicial system was initially developed privately by the Dutch East India Company, and gradually brought into closer conformity with Dutch law of the period.

== The beginnings ==
In the first years after Henry Hudson sailed up the river in 1609 and claimed the area for the Dutch East India Company and the government of the Republic of the Seven United Provinces, there was no real New Netherlands government and judicial system. The inhabitants of the small trading community of Manhattan Island as well as the members of the crew of the ships that came to the area, were subject to the rule of their captains. When the Dutch West India Company (WIC) was founded in 1621, the Dutch presence in America intensified and the States General charged the WIC to set up the appropriate forms of governance and judicial control.

== Early New Amsterdam governance and judiciary: the WIC ==
The city of New Amsterdam started as a purely commercial colony, mainly inhabited by employees of the WIC. Governance and adjudication was a matter of WIC control. In 1623 the first colonists, 30 Walloon families, came to New Netherlands. Willem Verhulst was one of the first local directors. He soon came into conflict with the colonists and Peter Minuit replaced him as a director in 1626.

The New Amsterdam director and his council exercised legislative, administrative and judicial powers, subject to review by the WIC’s Amsterdam Chamber, and finally the States General in the Republic of the United Provinces. The applicable law was at first a mixture of the law of the sea and the regular law of the Republic of the United Provinces, and it would slowly become entirely similar to the law of the Republic of the United Provinces.

== Next step: Patroonships ==
In 1629, the patroonship system was introduced as a solution to the financial problems of the WIC. The system of patroonships enabled Amsterdam investors to obtain large tracts of land on the condition that fifty families settled within those lands within four years. The patroons could establish and administer courts of justice (Patroon’s Courts). Appeal was possible to the director and the council of the WIC in New Amsterdam for fines higher than 50 guilders. The most famous and successful patroon was Kiliaen van Rensselaer who established Rensselaerwyck. The system of patroonships did not affect New Amsterdam, as the WIC retained control over Manhattan.

By 1640 the WIC no longer was the only commercial power in the territory of New Netherlands. There was a growing group of colonists who were attached to their new land, and who had their own interests. The policy of WIC director Willem Kieft aggravated the Indians, which led to conflicts between the Indians and the colonists. These incidents worsened the relationship between the colonists and the WIC. In response to the killing of a Dutch farmer by an Indian in 1641, director Kieft called a meeting with all heads of the families of Manhattan Island. A body of 12 men was formed to advise the director on retaliatory measures against the Indians, but they had higher ambitions. In 1642, the 12 men sent a petition to the director, calling attention to the system of governance in the colony. They wanted a government that resembled that of the Republic of the United Provinces back home. They also asked for criminal cases to longer be adjudicated without at least 5 members of the council present. When Kieft showed no inclination to make the suggested reforms, the body of eight men (the successor of the body of twelve) expressed their discontent about Kieft to the States-General and the WIC chambers in Amsterdam in 1643 and 1644. By the end of 1644, the complaints of the council about Kieft’s dominant behavior found sympathy at the States-General and the WIC chamber of Amsterdam, and Kieft was called back to the Republic.

== Reforms under Peter Stuyvesant ==
In early 1645, Peter Stuyvesant was appointed as director of New Amsterdam, and he was instructed to introduce a new form of government. However, due to internal conflicts in the WIC, Stuyvesant and vice-director Lubbert van Dincklagen arrived in New Amsterdam in 1647. The director, the vice-director and the fiscaal formed the Council. This Council was to be involved in all matters of governance and adjudication. In the latter function, the fiscaal acted as a public prosecutor, and the highest military official at hand took his position in the Council. The Council in the judicial formation was to be supplemented in criminal cases by two burghers (A religious group) from the place where the crime was committed. In addition to these reforms, Stuyvesant created a “Body of Nine Men”, consisting of three farmers, three burghers, and three tradesmen, which provided panels of three judges for civil cases to supplement the judicial formation of the director and the council.

On 4 April 1652, the States-General ordered several reforms, and as a result, a new Court of Magistrates for the city of New Amsterdam was set up in 1653. This court was modeled on the courts of justice in Amsterdam, consisting of a schout, two burgomasters, and five schepenen. Consistent with the judicial tradition in the 17th century Republic of the United Provinces, there were no jury trials and the use of arbitration to resolve disputes was widespread. The Court of Magistrates had jurisdiction over civil cases with a maximum of 100 guilders in controversy, small criminal cases, and arbitration on other disputes with the consent of the parties. In 1656, its jurisdiction in criminal cases was extended to cover cases requiring physical punishments (instead of fines).

Although the magistrates were laymen, they were generally held to have a good knowledge of Dutch (customary) law. The WIC provided law books, and vice-director Van Dincklagen and Adriaen van der Donck, former schout of Rensselaerwijck and a member of the Nine Men, held law degrees of Dutch universities.

== Regime-change: the English rule and the Duke’s laws ==
In August 1664, four English battleships invaded the harbor of New Amsterdam. On 6 September 1664, the Dutch capitulated, and Colonel Richard Nicolls was appointed as the new governor of the territory of New Netherlands, which was renamed New York, after its new proprietor, the Duke of York.

Upon surrendering, the Dutch negotiated the so-called “Articles of Capitulation”, which stated the conditions of the surrender. The Articles included provisions protecting the Dutch legal and judicial institutions. For example, the Dutch could keep their inheritance laws, which were very different from the English system, and Dutch law would still govern contracts concluded before the capitulation. Article 16 of the Articles of Capitulation stipulated that magistrates could keep their position for the period for which they were appointed. This meant that they continued in their official functions until 2 February 1665, the day on which they appointed their own successors.

This meant that in New Amsterdam, which was renamed New York City, and Albany, there was a transition period in which the old Dutch rules and customs were respected.

In other parts of the colony, the so-called Duke's laws (after the Duke of York, the proprietor of the colony) were adopted. The Duke’s laws introduced an English centralized system of government and adjudication, as opposed to the Dutch decentralized structure.

The governor and his council had yearly meetings with the high-sheriff and justices of the peace in the Court of Assizes. This was the highest court in the colony; appeal was only possible to the English king. There was to be a court of sessions, made up of justices of the peace and the under-sheriff, in all three “ridings” of the county of Yorkshire, which were courts of appeal for local disputes. In turn, every village had its local government: a constable and 8 “overseers” chosen by the free men. The constable was also the president of the local court.

In June 1665 Nicolls introduced the English form of municipal government in New York City and ordered that the Court of Magistrates should be renamed “Mayor’s Court”. Although the Dutch burgomaster and other officials objected against the reforms because they considered them to violate the Articles of Capitulation, the actual structure of the New York City government and judiciary did not change much. The roles of schout, burgomaster and schepenen were essentially maintained, but under different names: sheriff, mayor, and aldermen, respectively. The roles of mayor and sheriff were now fulfilled by Englishmen, and Nicholas Bayard, who was bilingual, was appointed as secretary. The mayor's court acted as a court of probate, a surrogates court, and a court of sessions. Dutch remained the spoken language at the Mayor’s Court until well into the 1670s, and records were kept in Dutch and English until 1673. One could say that the only real change was the introduction of the English concept of jury trials. Several authors have suggested that the Dutch did not appreciate the concept of trial by jury. Traditionally, the Dutch courts relied heavily on arbitrators and referees. It is suggested that the Dutch community in the New York area withdrew from the changed legal system that was now dominated by English juries, and instead turned to the Dutch Reformed church for their arbitration.

In 1673 there was a brief reoccupation of New Amsterdam by the Dutch, during which the Dutch system was reinstated. However, the Treaty of Westminster signed on February 9, 1674 ended the Dutch occupation, and from 1675 onwards, the Dutch influence on the New York legal system gradually diminished.
