= Adrian Jorisszen Tienpoint =

Dutch sea captain and explorer

- Born: Saardam, North Holland
- Occupation: Sea captain-explorer
- Known for: Commanded several ships to the newly developing colonies of New Netherland and New Sweden as well as other holdings of the Dutch Empire in North America in the early 17th century

Adriaen Jorissen Thienpoint or Tienpoint (born in Saardam, North Holland) was a Dutch sea captain-explorer who commanded several ships to the newly developing colonies of New Netherland and New Sweden as well as other holdings of the Dutch Empire in North America in the early 17th century.

In 1624, Tienpoint sailed the Eendracht to New Netherland on behalf of the Dutch West India Company. Soon thereafter Cornelius Jacobsen May arrived with the ship Nieu Netherlandt. at Nut Island in the Upper New York Bay. Passengers were dispersed to settlements at Kievet's Hook on the Connecticut River, Fort Wilhelmus on the Delaware River, and the first permanent Dutch settlement in North America, Fort Orange at present day Albany, New York.

According to John Romeyn Brodhead, Cornelius Jacobsen May was appointed as the first Director of the colony, with Adrian Joris as second in command. May hastened south to oversee construction of Fort Nassau on the South River to forestall French incursions. Tienpont was left in command of Fort Orange and was called its 'governor' in dispositions of an early settler taken in 1685 and 1688.

He acted as deputy for Director of New Netherland Willem Verhulst. Tienpoint negotiated covenants with Native American (Seneca, Cayugas, Iroquois, Oneidas, Onondagas, and Mohawks) in the Hudson Valley that were instrumental in establishing the Dutch fur trade, mostly in beaver pelts, in North America.

Tienpont skippered the Meeuwken which arrived in port in May 1626. Aboard was Peter Minuit, the new director of the nascent colony. In 1637, Tienpont captained the ship Fågel Grip as part of the first expedition from Sweden to the Delaware Valley led by Minuit.

== See also ==
- Adriaen Block
- Hendrick Christiaensen
- David Pietersz. de Vries
- Dutch colonization of the Americas
