= Wrecking of the Kattan =

Capture of Kattan by Spanish pirates

- Part of the Swedish expedition to New Sweden (1649)
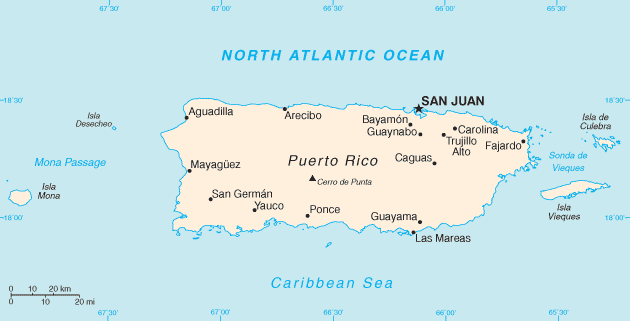
- Map of Puerto Rico
Date	6 September 1649
Location	Island near Puerto Rico
Result	Spanish victory

Belligerents
Swedish Empire	Spanish Empire; Spanish pirates

Commanders and leaders
(Swedish Empire) Cornelius Lucifer (POW) (Swedish Empire) Måns Bengtsson (POW) (Swedish Empire) Jan Janson Bockhorn (POW)	Unknown

Units involved
(Swedish Empire) Kattan	Unknown

Strength
1 ship 70 passengers 30 crew	2 ships

Casualties and losses
Entire crew captured	Unknown

The wrecking of the Kattan was the shipwrecking of the Swedish ship Kattan on 28 August 1649 near Puerto Rico. The crew was taken by Spanish pirates back to Puerto Rico.

== Background ==
Kalmar Nyckel

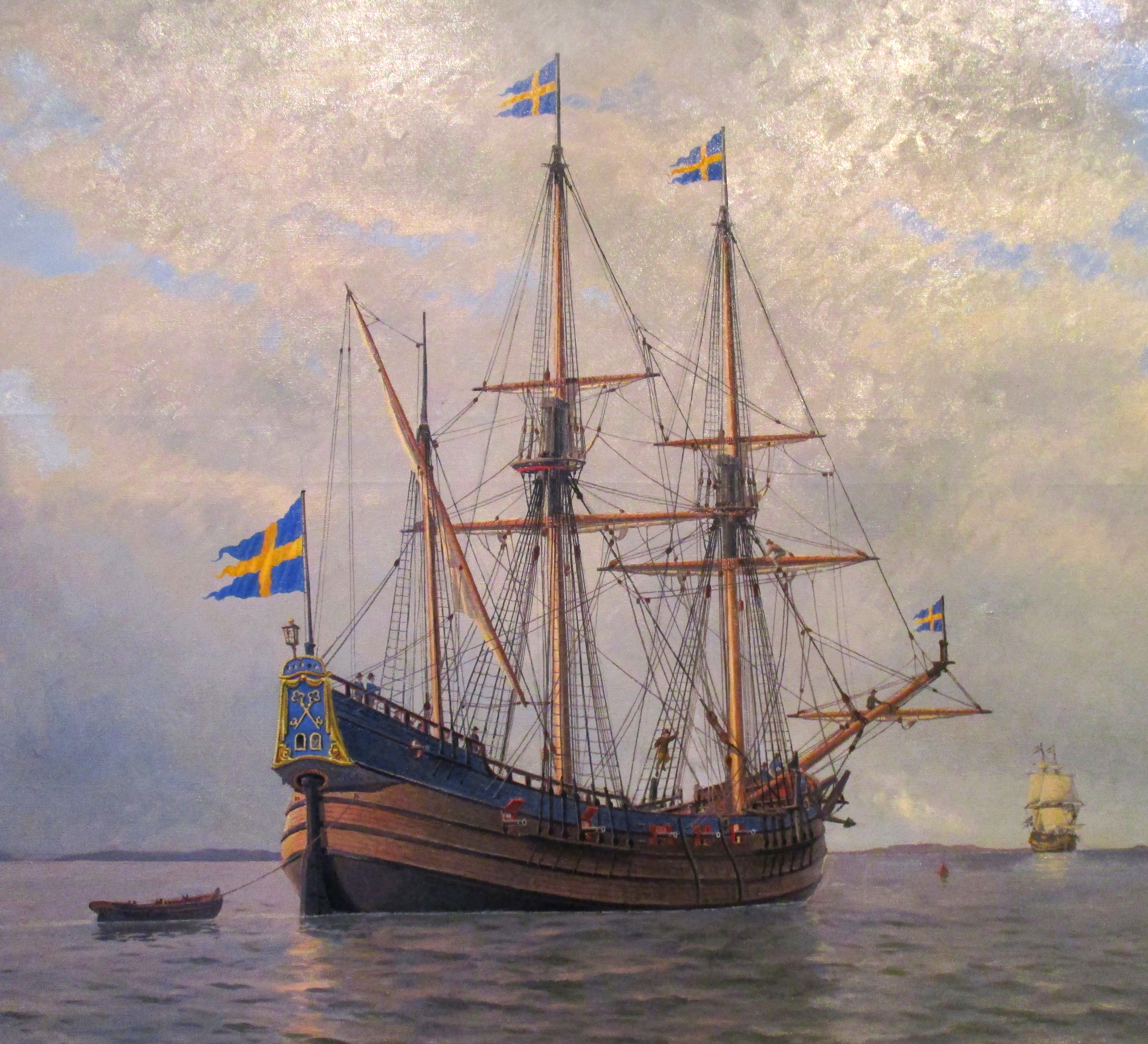
Kalmar Nyckel by Jacob Hägg

=== Expedition of 1649 ===
In 1649, when the colony of New Sweden was in need of new settlers and resources, the Swedish ship Kattan was sent towards New Sweden. It was originally the Kalmar Nyckel that was meant to sail towards the colony; however, that ship was so damaged that it had no chance of making it across the Atlantic. The captain of the Kattan was Cornelius Lucifer and the two shipmates were Måns Bengtsson and Jan Janson Bockhorn. The ship left Gothenburg harbor on 3 July.

== Wrecking ==
On 28 August, the Kattan got stuck in an underwater reef, but managed to break free. However, the ship quickly got stuck again, and the crew could not move it. The women and children on board were put into the lifeboats and rowed towards a nearby island with provisions. A severe storm later broke out and the crew was forced to cut off the masts and throw them into the water.

The next day, the men joined the women and children on the island. They tried to survive on the island for 8 days. Unfortunately for them, the island was uninhabited and had no fresh water.

After 5 days of surviving on the island, a bark passed by the stranded island, and the Swedes quickly fired two distress signals. But the ship did not dare to help as the skipper thought they were a pirate crew, and sailed to Puerto Rico to notify the Spaniards about it.

Then, 2 Spanish pirate ships appeared and asked who the survivors were. The survivors showed their Swedish passports, but the Spaniards said they had never heard of that country before.

The survivors were challenged to fight or surrender. Upon surrender, the Spanish pirates quickly stole all of the Swedes' possessions and brought them to Puerto Rico where they were forced to parade amid fifes and trumpets into the town square where they were forced to work or beg on the streets. Only a handful of the Swedes managed to survive.

== Aftermath ==
On 1 May 1650, 24 Swedes managed to get aboard a bark on which they began sailing away from Puerto Rico. However, after a few days of sailing they were attacked by a French ship and lost all of their possessions, they were subjected to physical abuse, with a woman dying after being raped by the French captain.
