= The Flying Deer (ship) =

17th-century Dutch ship

History

Dutch Republic
- Name: The Flying Deer
- Fate: Lost with all hands in August 1638

The Flying Deer (Dutch: Het fliegende hert) was a 17th-century Dutch ship. She was lost at sea with all hands during a hurricane off St. Kitts in 1638.

== History ==
The Flying Deer was an early 17th-century sloop in Dutch service. She was recorded as participating in the lucrative trans-Atlantic tobacco trade. In August 1638, the sloop was anchored off island of St. Kitts when the Swedish-flagged Kalmar Nyckel (which was returning from its first voyage to establish the colony of New Sweden) also dropped anchor off the island. The captain of The Flying Deer was a friend of Peter Minuit, a prominent explorer aboard the Swedish ship, and so Minuit and Captain Jan Hindricksen van der Water of Kalmar Nyckel were invited aboard The Flying Deer. During the visit, a powerful storm (possibly a hurricane) swept up on the island, battering the ships at anchor. Kalmar Nyckel rode out the storm at sea, but The Flying Deer was never seen again and presumed to be lost with all hands.
