= Wouter van Twiller =

Dutch colonial administrator

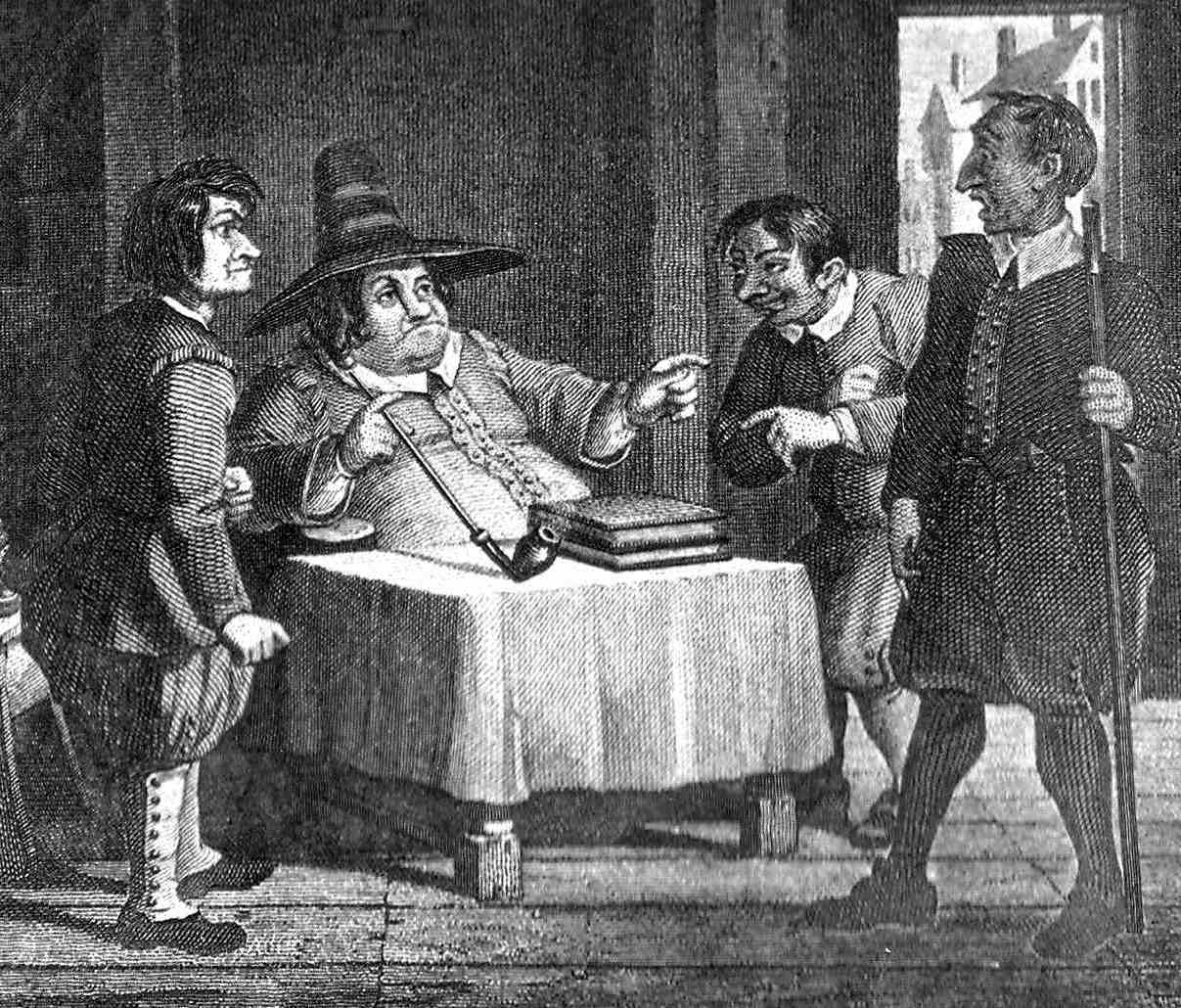
- A drawing of Wouter van Twiller by Washington Allston (detail)

5th Director of New Netherland
- In office 1633–1638
- Preceded by: Sebastiaen Jansen Krol
- Succeeded by: Willem Kieft

Personal details
- Born: May 22, 1606 Nijkerk, Netherlands
- Died: August 29, 1654 (aged 48) Amsterdam, Netherlands
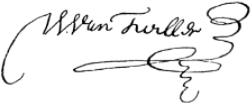
- Signature

Wouter van Twiller (May 22, 1606 – buried August 29, 1654) was an employee of the Dutch West India Company and the fifth Director of New Netherland. He governed from 1632 until 1638, succeeding Peter Minuit, who was recalled by the Dutch West India authorities in Amsterdam for unknown reasons.

== Life and career ==
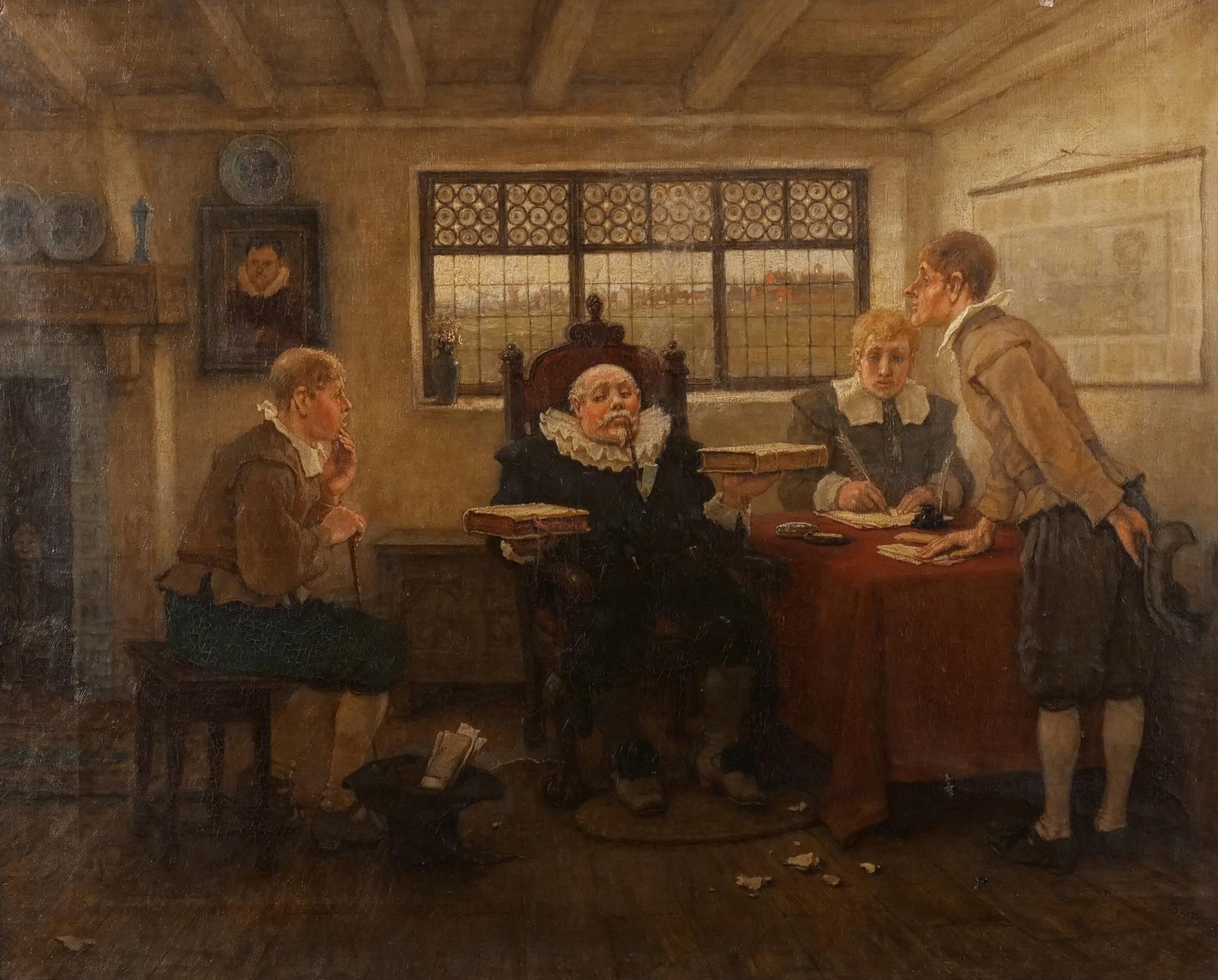
Wouter Van Twiller's Court New Amsterdam, by George Henry Boughton

Coat of Arms of Wouter Van Twiller

Van Twiller was born in Nijkerk, the son of Ryckaert and Maria van Rensselaer van Twiller. Kiliaen van Rensselaer was his maternal uncle.

He was appointed to the position because he had made two voyages to the New Netherland colony before, and had been a clerk in the warehouse of the Dutch West India company in Amsterdam for nearly five years. Rensselaer entrusted him with shipping cattle to the Manor of Rensselaerswyck, his colonial estate on the Hudson River. Van Twiller was somewhat acquainted with the geography of New Netherlands and the condition of its affairs. Largely through Van Rensselaer's influence the Dutch West India Company chose him as the new Director-General of New Netherlands, and he set sail for New Amsterdam, which was little more than a trading post, in the ship De Zoutberg in 1633. During the voyage across the Atlantic Twiller managed to capture a Spanish Caravel and docked the prize safely in the harbor by Fort Amsterdam.

Amid a considerable amount of land and properties, including islands known in the present day as Roosevelt Island and Randalls and Wards Islands, Van Twiller purchased 'Noten Eylant', later called Governors Island from a tribe of Canarsee Indians for two axe heads, a string of beads and some iron nails. While in office, settlers from New England occupied the Connecticut Valley and he was never able to oust them. He was able to defend the Dutch territory in the Delaware Valley, where his soldiers captured a shipload of intended settlers from Virginia and expelled soldiers who had taken Fort Nassau.

Van Twiller was able to both increase the colony's prosperity and amass a private fortune despite conflicts with Everhardus Bogardus, Dutch Reformed predikant of the New Netherland colony; and schout Lubbert van Dincklagen, who criticized Van Twiller's management of New Netherland. The Director expelled Van Dincklagen, refusing to pay the salary arrears owed him. Back in Amsterdam, Van Dincklagen brought the situation to the attention of the company directors. His report was confirmed by Captain David Pietersz. de Vries and Van Twiller was removed from office in the summer of 1637.

To succeed Van Twiller as Director-General, the Dutch West India Company sent Willem Kieft in September 1637. Van Twiller subsequently returned to the Netherlands and assumed guardianship of Johannes, eldest son of Killian van Rensselaer, following the death of that patroon in 1644. He died in Amsterdam.

== See also ==
- Dutch colonization of the Americas
- Dutch Empire
- List of colonial governors of New Jersey
- List of colonial governors of New York

== Bibliography ==
- Lamb, Martha J. (1877). History of the City of New York. Its origin, rise and progress. A.S. Barnes and Co. p. 66. "Governor Van Twiller 1633-1638"
- New Amsterdam Project
- Griffis, William Elliot The Story of New Netherland. The Dutch In America Chapter VI. The Riverside Press. Cambridge. 1909
- Jacobs, Jaap. New Netherland: A Dutch Colony in Seventeenth-Century America. Leiden: Brill Academic Publishers, 2005. ISBN 90-04-12906-5.
- Johnson, Allen (ed.) Dutch and English on the Hudson (Chapter IV). New Haven: Yale University Press. 1919

Preceded by Peter Minuit	Director of New Netherland; 1633–1638	Succeeded by Willem Kieft
