= Sebastiaen Jansen Krol =

Director-General of New Netherland

4th Director of New Netherland
- In office 1632–1633
- Preceded by: Peter Minuit
- Succeeded by: Wouter van Twiller

Personal details
- Born: 1595 Harlingen, Friesland, Dutch Republic
- Died: after September 1645 Amsterdam, Dutch Republic
- Spouse: Annetje Cristoffels

Bastiaen Jansz Krol (also Sebastia(e)n Jans(s)en Crol or Crull; 1595, Harlingen – 14 March 1674) was Director of New Netherland from 1632 to 1633.

== Early life ==
When he was 10, Krol's family moved from Friesland to Amsterdam and in 1623 he lived on the Bloemgracht. In that year he presented himself to church elders of the Dutch Reformed Church to be sent abroad as a "ziekentrooster" ("comforter of the sick").

== New Netherland ==
On 25 January 1624 he sailed to New Netherland, where he arrived when Cornelius May just had become the first Director-General. In November 1624 he had returned to Amsterdam and made a report to the church elders, who gave him the right to perform baptisms and weddings in the new colony. He probably sailed back to New Amsterdam in May or June 1625, prior to the arrival of Peter Minuit the next year.

Bastiaen Krol is most frequently remembered for arranging the purchase of the domain of Rensselaerswyck in 1630. Kiliaen van Rensselaer was one of the first to ask for a grant of land. He received a tract of country to the north and south of Fort Orange, but not including that trading-post, which, like the island of Manhattan, remained under the control of the Dutch West India Company. By virtue of this grant and later purchases, van Rensselaer acquired a tract comprising what are now the counties of Albany and Rensselaer with part of Columbia in the state of New York.

Before and after his post as Director-General, Krol was commander of Fort Orange. He returned to the Netherlands at least two more times. Between 1638 and 1643 he lived in New Netherland, but the last records of him are from September 1645 in "Old" Amsterdam.

== Personal life ==
In 1615, he married Annetje Cristoffels in Amsterdam.

== See also ==
- Colonial America
- Dutch colonization of the Americas
- Dutch Empire
- List of colonial governors of New Jersey
- List of colonial governors of New York

Preceded by Peter Minuit	Director of New Netherland; 1632—1633	Succeeded by Wouter van Twiller
