= Swedes' Landing =

Site of the first colonial Swedish landing in modern Delaware, U.S.

Coordinates: 39.7364°N 75.53920°W

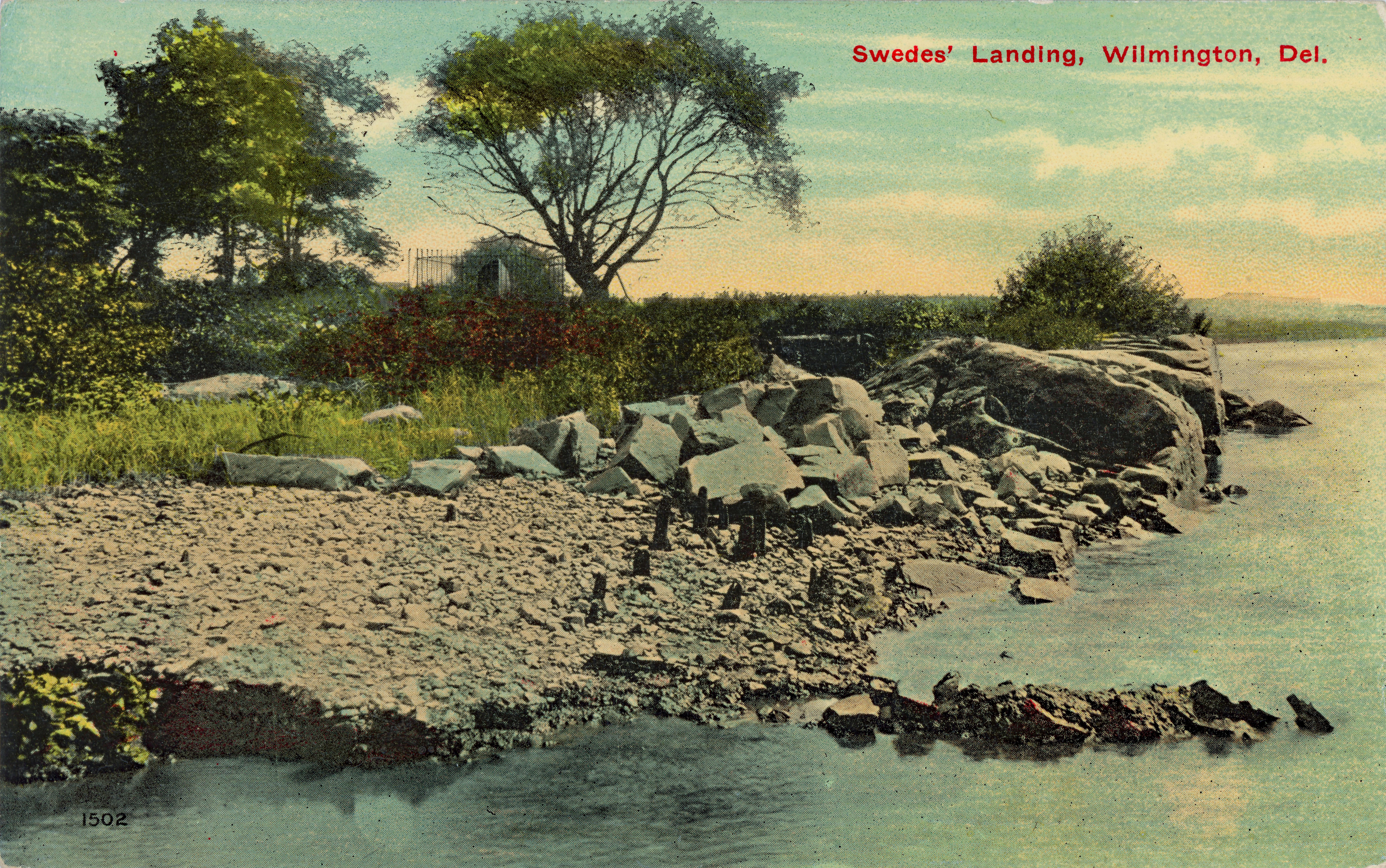
Swedes' Landing as it appeared in the early 20th century.

Swedes' Landing is the warehouse road found along the Minquas Kill in Wilmington, Delaware that is close to the Delaware River. This was the site where the initial Swedish landing took place and marks the spot where the New Sweden colony began. The first Swedish expedition to North America, under the command of Peter Minuit, embarked from the port of Gothenburg in late 1637. The members of the expedition, aboard the ships Fogel Grip and Kalmar Nyckel, sailed into Delaware Bay, which lay within the territory claimed by the Dutch West India Company and anchored at a rocky point on Swedes' Landing on March 29, 1638. They built a fort on the site which they named Fort Christina after Queen Christina of Sweden. Today Swedes Landing Road is a short stretch from 4th Street to 7th Street and ends at a long two-story mural depicting the area from the time before the Swedes came through the modern Wilmington waterfront. At the far end of the mural is the entrance to Fort Christina National Historical Site, a part of the First State National Historical Park System.

== Other sources ==
- Jameson, J. Franklin Willem Usselinx,: Founder of the Dutch and Swedish West India Companies (G.P. Putnam's Sons. 1887)
- Mickley, Joseph J. Some account of William Usselinx and Peter Minuit: Two individuals who were instrumental in establishing the first permanent colony in Delaware (The Historical Society of Delaware. 1881)

" Fort Christina-Mural"
