= Fogel Grip =

Swedish sailing ship

History
- Name: Fogel Grip
- Port of registry: Sweden
- Launched: early 17th century, Netherlands
- Fate: Wrecked August 1639

General characteristics
- Class & type: Sailing ship
- Length: 30 m (98 ft)
- Sail plan: Pinnace

Fogel Grip (Bird Griffin, Swedish: Fågel Grip) was a Swedish sailing ship originally built in the Netherlands in the early 17th century. She was used on the first Swedish expedition in 1638 together with Kalmar Nyckel to establish the colony of New Sweden.

== The ship ==
Little is known about the vessel. Fogel Grip was a full-rigged pinnace about 30 meters (98 ft) long. Originally built in the Netherlands in the early 17th century the ship was bought by the Swedish South Company in 1636 or 1637.

== The New Sweden expedition ==
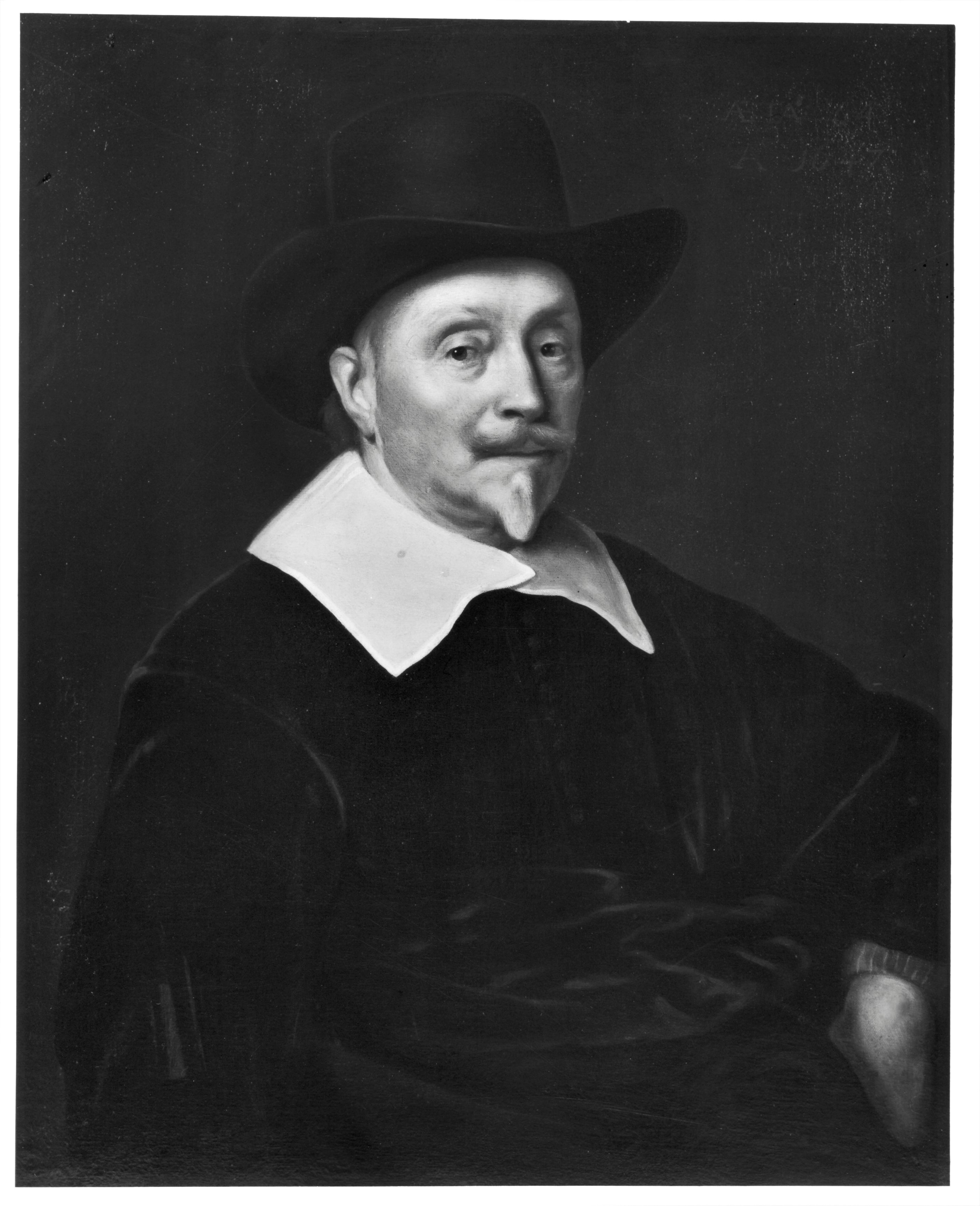
Samuel Blommaert (1583-1651)

The first expedition was prepared by Samuel Blommaert in secrecy in fear of the Dutch West India Company which at that time dominated the area. The commander was Peter Minuit.

In November 1637, Fogel Grip captained by Adrian Jöransen and Kalmar Nyckel captained by Jan Hindricksen van der Water left Gothenburg harbor. The crew was part Dutch and part Swedish; the Swedes on Fogel Grip were under the command of Måns Nilsson Kling.

The expedition was caught in bad weather in the North Sea badly damaging both ships. Separated during the storm, both vessels made it to Texel and Medemblik for repairs. After about one month the expedition could continue and the ships left port on 31 December.

Passing the Canary Islands and Saint Christopher Island the expedition reached Delaware Bay in March 1638 sailing up the Delaware River where they made landfall at the mouth of Christina River in present-day Wilmington, Delaware.

Fogel Grip then cruised the Caribbean Sea for some time before returning to New Sweden bringing the former slave Anthony Swartz from St. Kitts. The ship was then loaded with fur and tobacco before leaving for Sweden and on the return in around June 1639 the cargo was sold.

In August 1639, Fogel Grip was shipwrecked on a sand shoal in Gothenburg harbor during a storm and abandoned.

== Legacy ==
Models of Fogel Grip and Kalmar Nyckel are kept at Gloria Dei (Old Swedes') Church in Philadelphia, Pennsylvania.

In 1938 the Swedish mail issued a commemorative stamp of both ships.
