= Willem Verhulst =

Dutch colonial governor

2nd Director of New Netherland
- In office 1625–1626
- Preceded by: Cornelis Jacobszoon May
- Succeeded by: Peter Minuit

Willem Verhulst or Willem van Hulst was an employee of the Dutch West India Company and the second (provisional) Director of the New Netherland colony in 1625–26. Nothing can be verified about his life before and after this period. Verhulst may have consummated the purchase of Manhattan Island on behalf of the Dutch West India Company, although there is still considerable debate over the evidence that also supports the purchase by Peter Minuit.

== Life and career ==
Verhulst sailed from the Netherlands in January 1625 on the ship Orangenboom ("Orange Tree") as "provisionally director of the colonists". In April of that year, four more ships sailed out with settlers and farm animals (the ships were named Paert, Koe, Schaep, and Makreel, meaning "horse, "cow", sheep" and "mackerel"). He had received detailed instructions from the board of directors. In 1625, Verhulst oversaw the decision to locate Fort Amsterdam, the company's main fortress, and town on the tip of Manhattan Island in the colony of New Netherland. The settlement, which was given the name New Amsterdam, was the first permanent European settlement in what was later called New York City.

Verhulst was not popular with the Dutch colonists and was quickly replaced by Peter Minuit. He sailed back to the Dutch Republic on the Wapen van Amsterdam ("Arms of Amsterdam") which left September 23 and arrived November 4, 1626 in Amsterdam. He brought with him the news that the colony was doing well and that Manhattan had been bought from the natives for goods valued at 60 guilders, leading some historians to propose that the otherwise obscure Verhulst oversaw this transaction. Although, there is still significant debate over the evidence, whether Minuit or Verhulst had executed the permission of the island of Manhattan.and the traditional version of the story attributes Peter Minuit with conducting and completing the purchase.

== See also ==
- Adrian Jorisszen Tienpoint, Verhulst's deputy

== Sources ==
- Goodwin, Maud Wilder (1897). Fort Amsterdam in the days of the Dutch. New York: The Knickerbocker press.
- Shorto, Russell (2004). The island at the center of the world. New York : Doubleday. ISBN 9780385503495.

== See also ==
- Dutch colonization of the Americas
- Dutch Empire
- Fort Wilhelmus
- List of colonial governors of New Jersey
- List of colonial governors of New York

Preceded by Cornelius Mey	Director of New Netherland; 1625—1626	Succeeded by Peter Minuit
