= Peter Minuit =

3rd Director of New Netherland (1626–31)

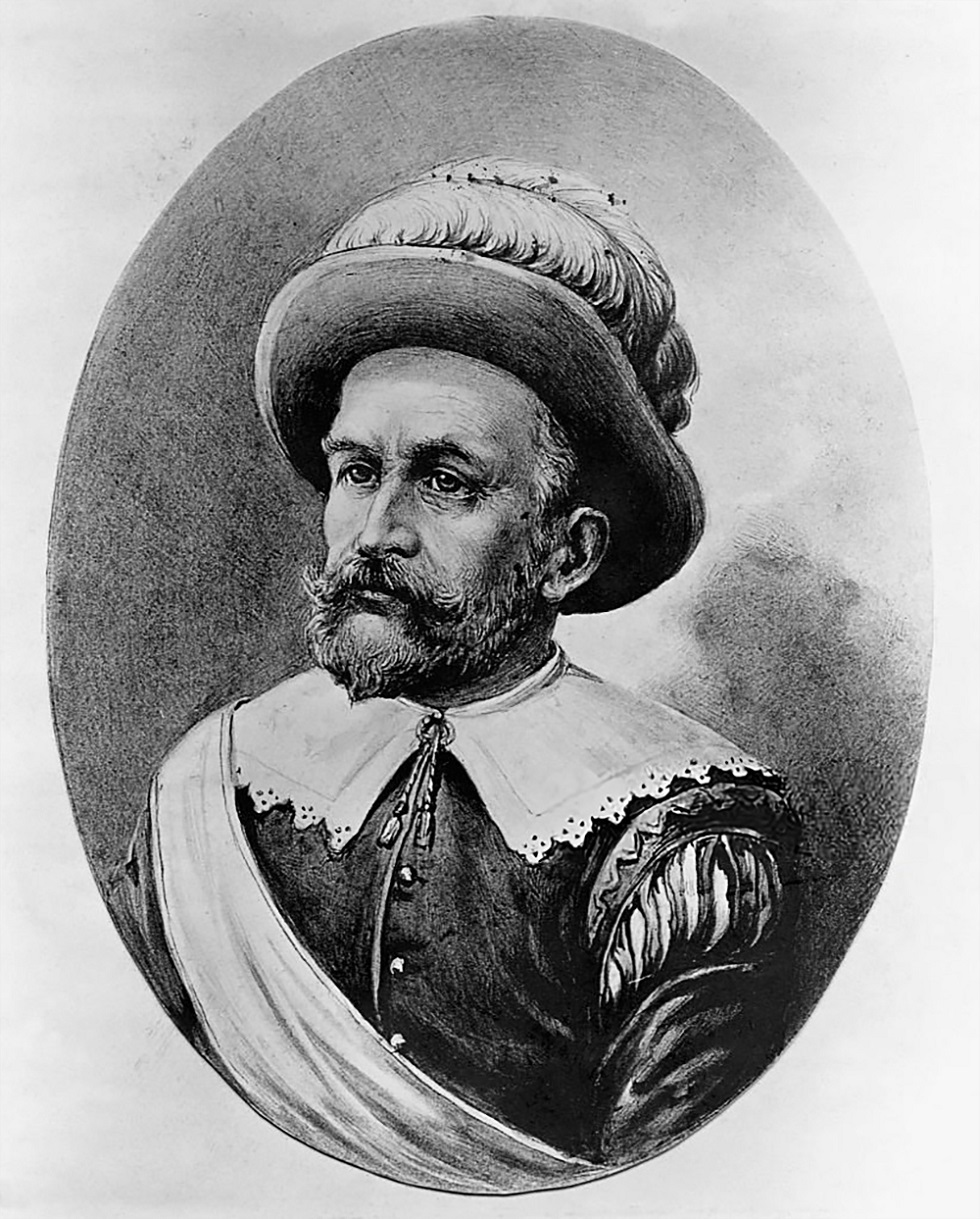
- Peter Minuit portrait (c. 1904), based on an older painting

3rd Director of New Netherland
- In office 1626–1631
- Preceded by: Willem Verhulst
- Succeeded by: Sebastiaen Jansen Krol

Personal details
- Born: 1580 Wesel, Duchy of Cleves, Holy Roman Empire (modern North Rhine-Westphalia, Germany)
- Died: 1638 (aged 58) St. Christopher

Peter Minuit (French: Pierre Minuit, Dutch: Peter Minnewit; (Note: Also Pieter Minuit, Pierre Minuit, or Peter Minnewit) c. 1580 – August 5, 1638) was a Walloon merchant and politician who was the 3rd director of the Dutch North American colony of New Netherland from 1626 until 1631, and 3rd Governor of New Netherland. He founded the Swedish colony of New Sweden on the Delaware Peninsula in 1638.

Minuit was born in Wesel, in modern northwestern Germany. He is generally credited with orchestrating the purchase of Manhattan Island for the Dutch West India Company from representatives of the Lenape, the area's indigenous people. Manhattan later became the site of the Dutch city of New Amsterdam, and the borough of Manhattan of modern New York City. A letter written by Dutch merchant Peter Schaghen to directors of the Dutch East India Company stated that Manhattan was purchased for "60 guilders worth of trade", an amount worth ~$1,143 U.S. dollars as of 2020.

== Biography ==
=== Early life ===
Peter Minuit was born in Wesel, Germany between 1580 and 1585 into a Calvinist family that had moved from the city of Tournai (presently part of Wallonia, Belgium) in the Southern Netherlands controlled by Spain, in order to avoid Spanish Catholic authorities, who were not favorably disposed toward Protestants. His surname means "midnight" in French.

His father, Johann Minuit, died in 1609 and Peter took over management of the household and his father's business. Peter had a good reputation in Wesel, attested by the fact that he was several times appointed a guardian. He also assisted the poor during the Spanish occupation of 1614–1619.

Minuit married Gertrude Raedts from Cleve on August 20, 1613. Gertrude was from a wealthy family and she probably helped Peter Minuit establish himself as a broker. A will drawn up in 1615 in the Dutch city of Utrecht, mentions "Peter Minnewit" as a diamond cutter. Whether he traded in other items is unknown. He spelled his own surname as Minuit, but the spelling Minnewit shows the pronunciation. Thus in some old books Minnewit is used.

By 1624, the city was in an economic decline and in 1625, he had left Wesel and like others, went to Holland. At first, Gertrude went to stay with her relatives in Cleve.

=== As director of New Netherland ===
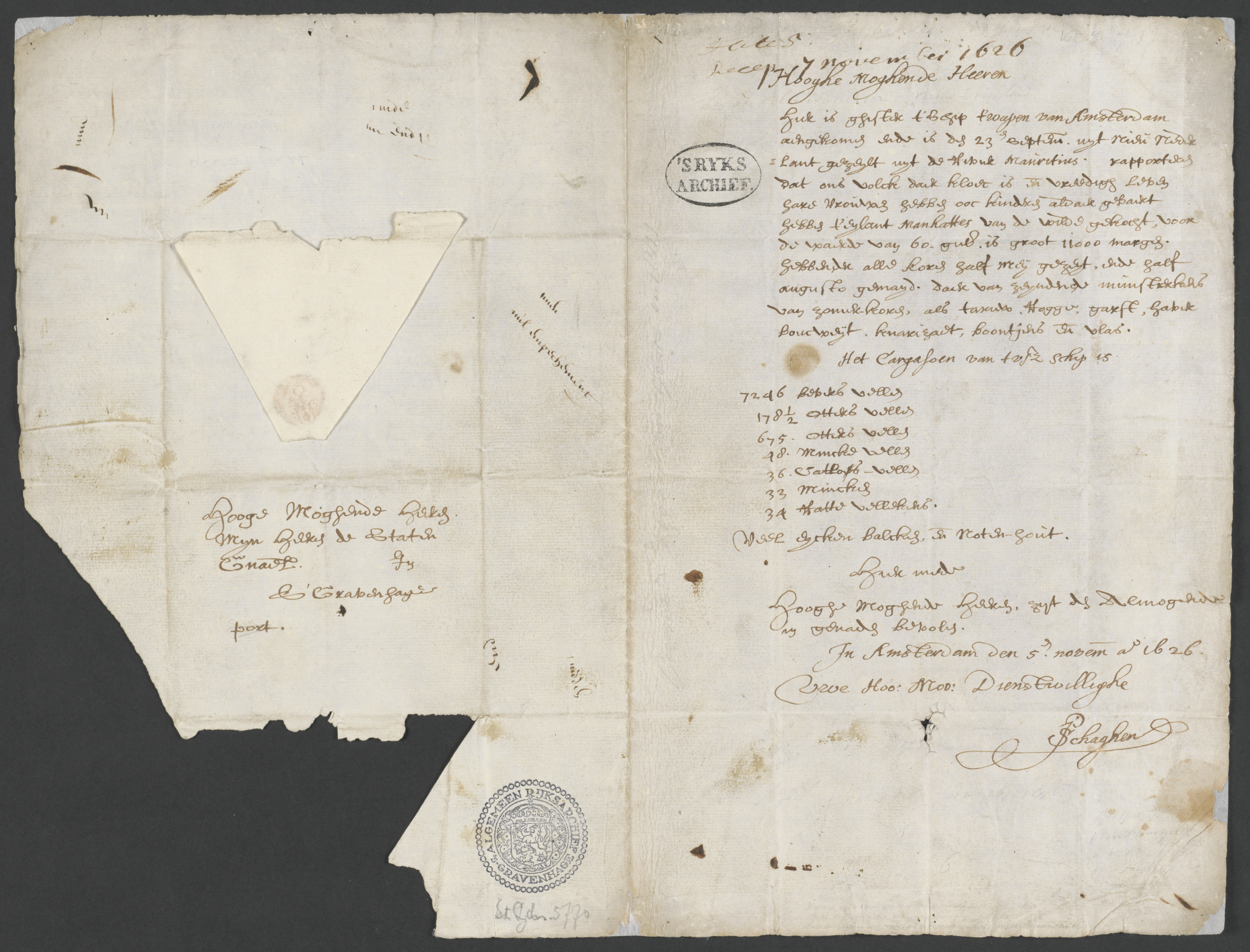
1626 letter in Dutch by Pieter Schaghen stating the purchase of Manhattan for 60 guilders

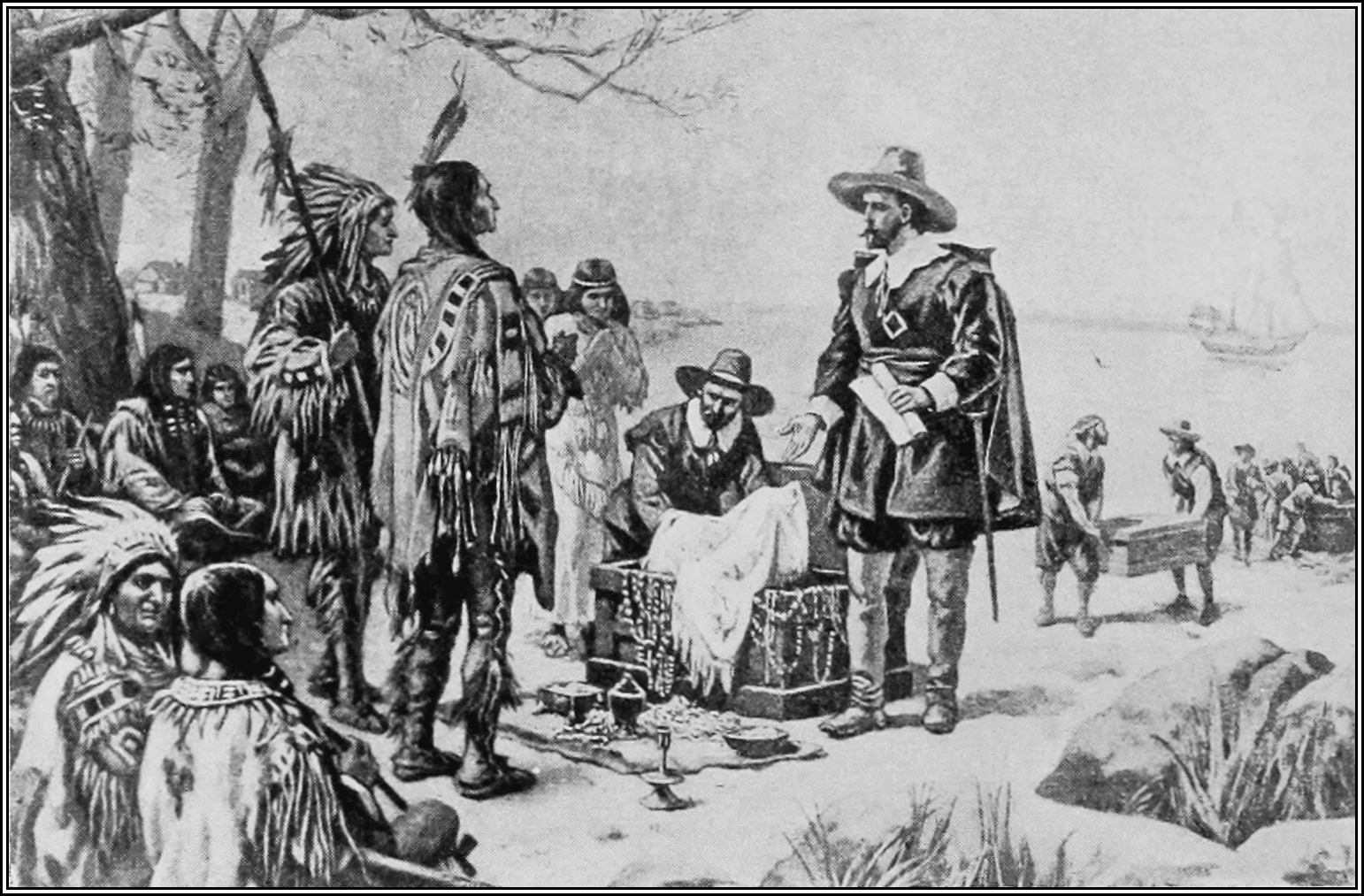
1909 drawing of The Purchase of Manhattan Island with Minuit presiding

Minuit joined the Dutch West India Company, probably in the mid-1620s, and was sent with his family to New Netherland in 1625 to search for tradable goods other than the animal pelts that then were the major product coming from New Netherland. He returned in the same year, and in 1626 was appointed the new director of New Netherland, taking over from Willem Verhulst. He sailed to North America and arrived in the colony on May 4, 1626.

Minuit is credited with purchasing the island of Manhattan from Native Americans in exchange for traded goods valued at 60 guilders. The figure of 60 guilders comes from a letter by a representative of the Dutch States-General and member of the board of the Dutch West India Company, Pieter Janszoon Schagen, to the States-General in November 1626. In 1844, New York historian John Romeyn Brodhead converted the figure of Fl 60 (or 60 guilders) to US$24. By 2006 sixty guilders in 1626 was worth approximately $1,000 according to the Institute for Social History of Amsterdam.

The original inhabitants of the area were unfamiliar with the European notions and definitions of ownership rights. For the Indians, water, air and land could not be traded; therefore, it is likely that both parties probably went home with totally different interpretations of the sales agreement.

A contemporary purchase of rights in nearby Staten Island, to which Minuit also was party, involved duffel cloth, iron kettles, axe heads, hoes, wampum, drilling awls, "Jew's harps", and "diverse other wares". "If similar trade goods were involved in the Manhattan arrangement", Burrows and Wallace surmise, "then the Dutch were engaged in high-end technology transfer, handing over equipment of enormous usefulness in tasks ranging from clearing land to drilling wampum."

Minuit conducted politics in a measure of democracy in the colony during his time in New Netherland. He was highest judge in the colony, but in both civil and criminal affairs he was assisted by a council of five colonists. This advisory body would advise the director and jointly with him would develop, administer, and adjudicate a body of laws to help govern the colony. In addition there was a schout-fiscal, half-sheriff, half-attorney-general, and the customs officer. During Minuit's administration, several mills were built, trade grew exponentially, and the population grew to almost 300.

In 1632, the Dutch West India Company (WIC) suspended Minuit from his post for reasons that are unclear, but probably for (perhaps unintentionally) abetting the landowning patroons who were engaging in illegal fur trade and otherwise enriching themselves against the interests and orders of the West India Company. He arrived back in Europe in August 1632 to explain his actions, but was dismissed and was succeeded as director by Wouter van Twiller. It is possible that Minuit had become the victim of the internal disputes over the rights that the board of directors had given to the patroons.

=== Establishing the New Sweden colony ===
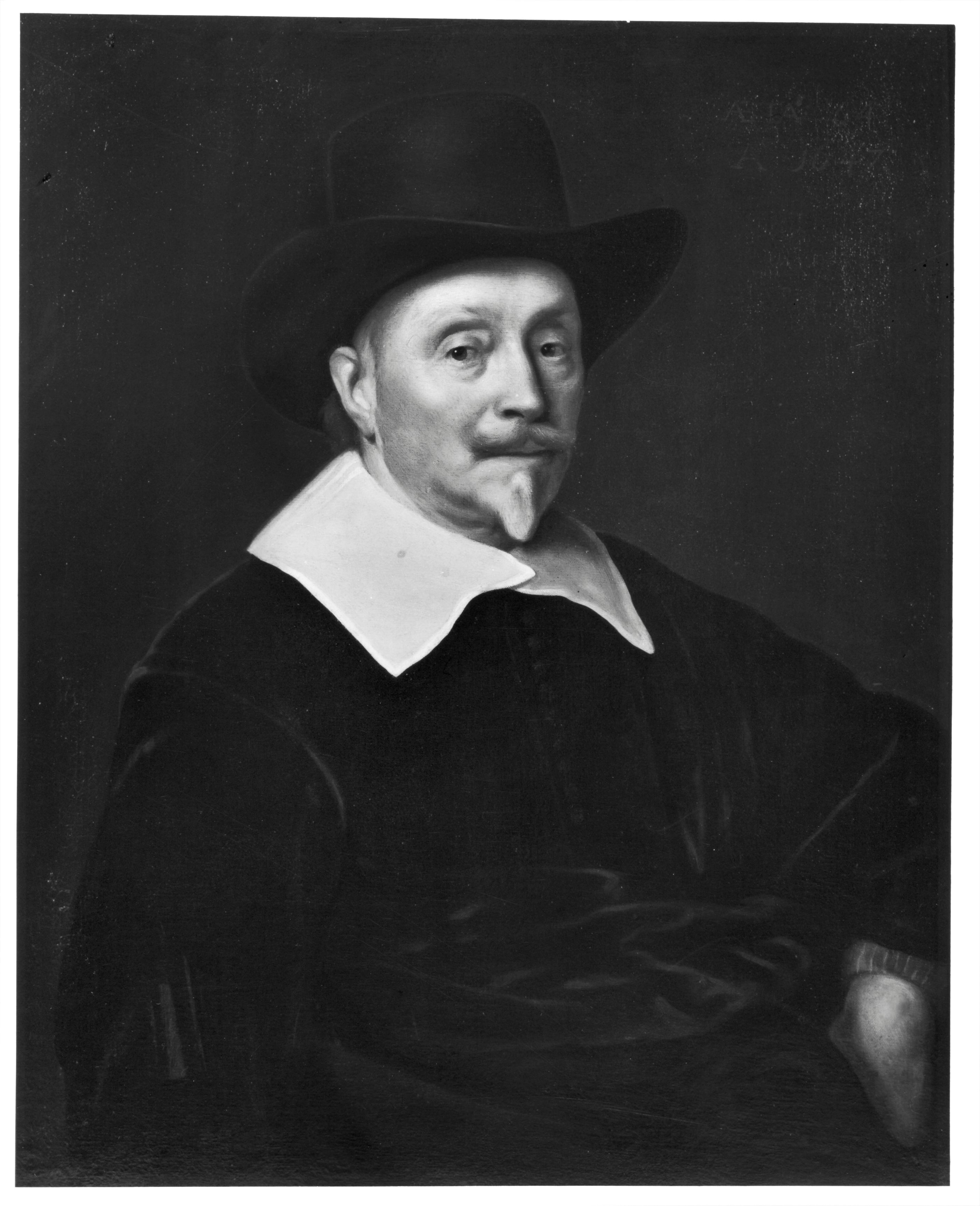
Samuel Blommaert (1583–1651)

After having lived in Emmerich (Duchy of Cleves) for several years, Minuit made arrangements with Samuel Blommaert and the Swedish government in 1637 to create the first Swedish colony in the New World. Located on the lower Delaware River within territory earlier claimed by the Dutch, it was called New Sweden. Minuit and his company arrived on the Fogel Grip and Kalmar Nyckel at Swedes' Landing, which is present-day Wilmington, Delaware, on March 29, 1638. Minuit left the colony on May 20, 1638, and sailed to the Caribbean island of St. Christopher, where he arrived on June 15 to barter salt, a ship's cargo of wine and liquor for tobacco to make the voyage profitable.

== Death ==
During this voyage, Minuit drowned when the ship he was visiting (at the invitation of its Dutch captain, a friend of Minuit), The Flying Deer, was lost with all hands during a hurricane near St. Kitts. One ship sank near the Azores, another arrived without mast. The losses suffered, such as goods and Minuit, caused irreversible damage to Sweden's colonization attempts. Two years later, Swedish Lt. Måns Nilsson Kling, whose rank was raised to captain, replaced Minuit as governor. Nine expeditions to the colony were carried out before the Dutch captured it in 1655.

== Legacy ==
=== Places named after Minuit ===
- The Staten Island Ferry Whitehall Terminal's Peter Minuit Plaza, north of the South Ferry – Whitehall Street station (1, N, R, and W trains). Following the 400th-anniversary celebrations of Henry Hudson's voyage to Manhattan, a pavilion was opened there to honor the Dutch. Each night at midnight, LED lights around the pavilion's perimeter glow in honor of Minuit.
- A marker in Inwood Hill Park at the supposed site of the purchase of Manhattan.
- A granite flagstaff base in Battery Park, which depicts the historic purchase.
- A school and playground in East Harlem, which are named for him.
- An apartment building at 25 Claremont Avenue in Manhattan, which bears his name above the front entrance.
- The Peter Minuit Chapter of the Daughters of the American Revolution.
- A memorial on Moltkestraße in Wesel, North Rhine-Westphalia, Germany.

=== In popular culture ===
- The beginning lines of Rodgers and Hart's 1939 song "Give It Back to the Indians" recount the sale of Manhattan: "Old Peter Minuit had nothing to lose when he bought the isle of Manhattan / For twenty-six dollars and a bottle of booze, and they threw in the Bronx and Staten / Pete thought he had the best of the bargain, but the poor red man just grinned / And he grunted "ugh!" (meaning "okay" in his jargon) for he knew poor Pete was skinned."
- Minuit was played by Groucho Marx in the 1957 comedy film The Story of Mankind.
- Minuit was played by Michael Landon in the 1970 film Swing Out, Sweet Land.
- Minuit is mentioned on the HBO drama Boardwalk Empire, where the character Edward Bader tells a joke featuring the line, "'50 bucks?' the fella says. 'Peter Stuyvesant only paid 24 for the entire island of Manhattan!'", while Steve Buscemi's' character Enoch 'Nucky' Thompson has to correct Bader and inform him that it was in fact Peter Minuit who bought Manhattan, not Stuyvesant.
- Bob Dylan mentions Minuit in his song "Hard Times in New York Town" (released on The Bootleg Series Volume 1) in the following line: Mister Hudson come a-sailing down the stream, / and old Mister Minuit paid for his dream. In the released recording of the song, however, Dylan spoonerizes "Mister Minuit" by mispronouncing his name as "Minnie Mistuit." The official lyrics have the correct version of the name, except that Minuit is spelled "Minuet."
- Minuit is mentioned in the first episode, Uno, of the AMC drama Better Call Saul. Jimmy McGill (the later titular Saul), while confronting lawyers at his brother's law firm, accuses them of being "like Peter Minuit" and suggests that they "throw in some beads and shells" to the $26,000.00 being given to his brother.
- In Manahatta, a play by Mary Kathryn Nagle, Minuit is a featured character, depicted in his involvement in the colonization of Turtle Island.

== See also ==
- Dutch colonization of the Americas
- Dutch Empire
- List of colonial governors of New Jersey
- List of colonial governors of New York
- Canarsee

== Notes ==
Political offices
Preceded by Willem Verhulst	Director of New Netherland; May 4, 1626–1631	Succeeded by Sebastiaen Jansen Krol
New title new colony	Governor of New Sweden; March 29, 1638 – June 15, 1638	Succeeded by Måns Nilsson Kling
