= Swedish South Company =

Swedish transatlantic trading company

New Netherland (magenta) and New Sweden (blue)

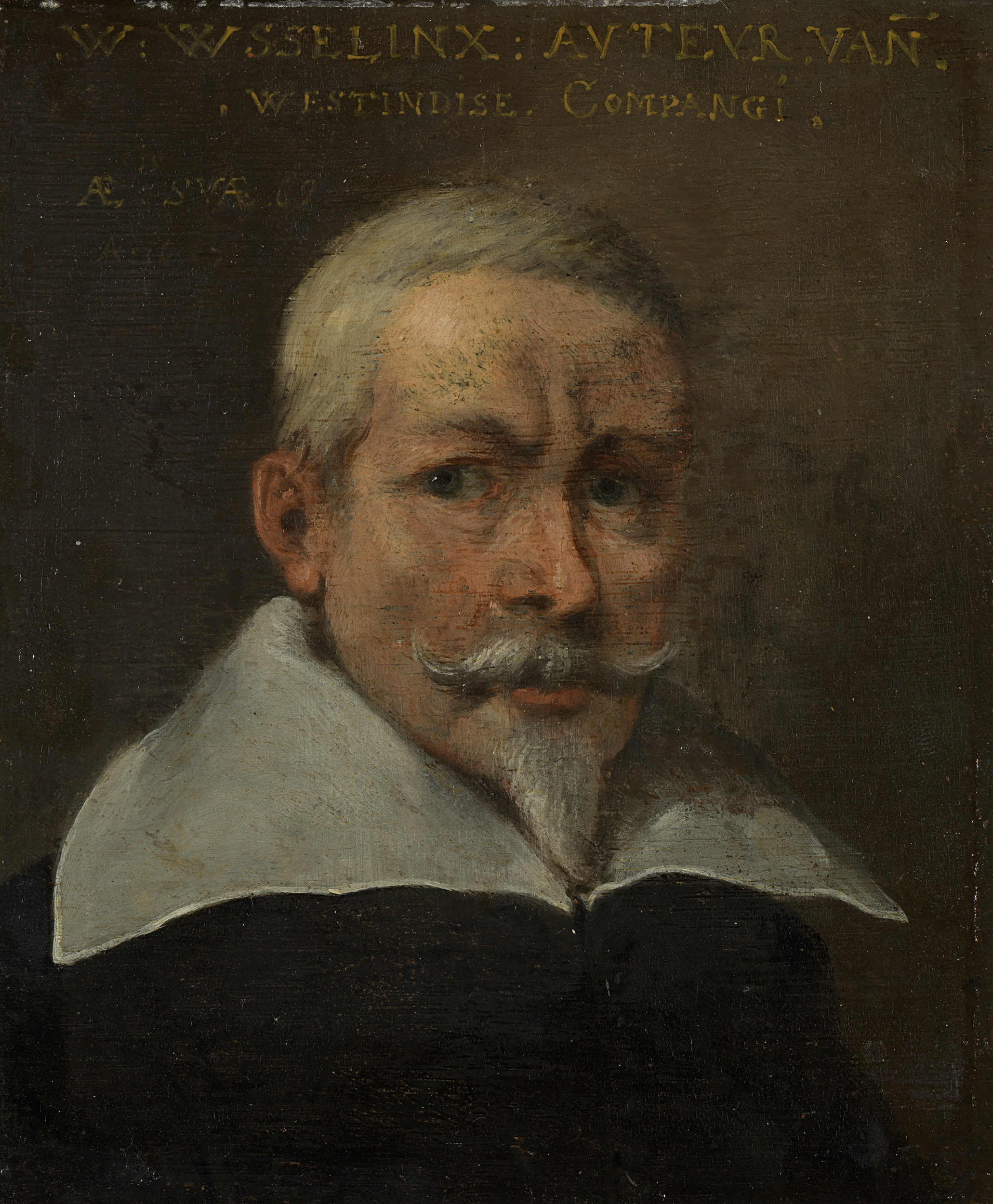
Willem Usselincx, founder of the Dutch West India Company and the Swedish South Company

The Swedish South Company, also known as the Company of New Sweden (Swedish, Söderkompaniet, Nya Sverige-kompaniet), was a trading company from Sweden founded in 1626, that supported the trade between Sweden and its colony New Sweden, in North America. The colony was envisioned by its founding father Willem Usselincx; it was to become the first Swedish transoceanic trading project.

In 1649, the company lost its monopoly on tobacco that had been granted by the queen of Sweden in 1641. In 1655, New Sweden was annexed by New Netherland. This brought an end to the activities of the Swedish South Company, and it was dissolved in 1680.
