= Kalmar Nyckel =

Swedish ship built by the Dutch

Coordinates: 39°44′12″N 75°32′13″W

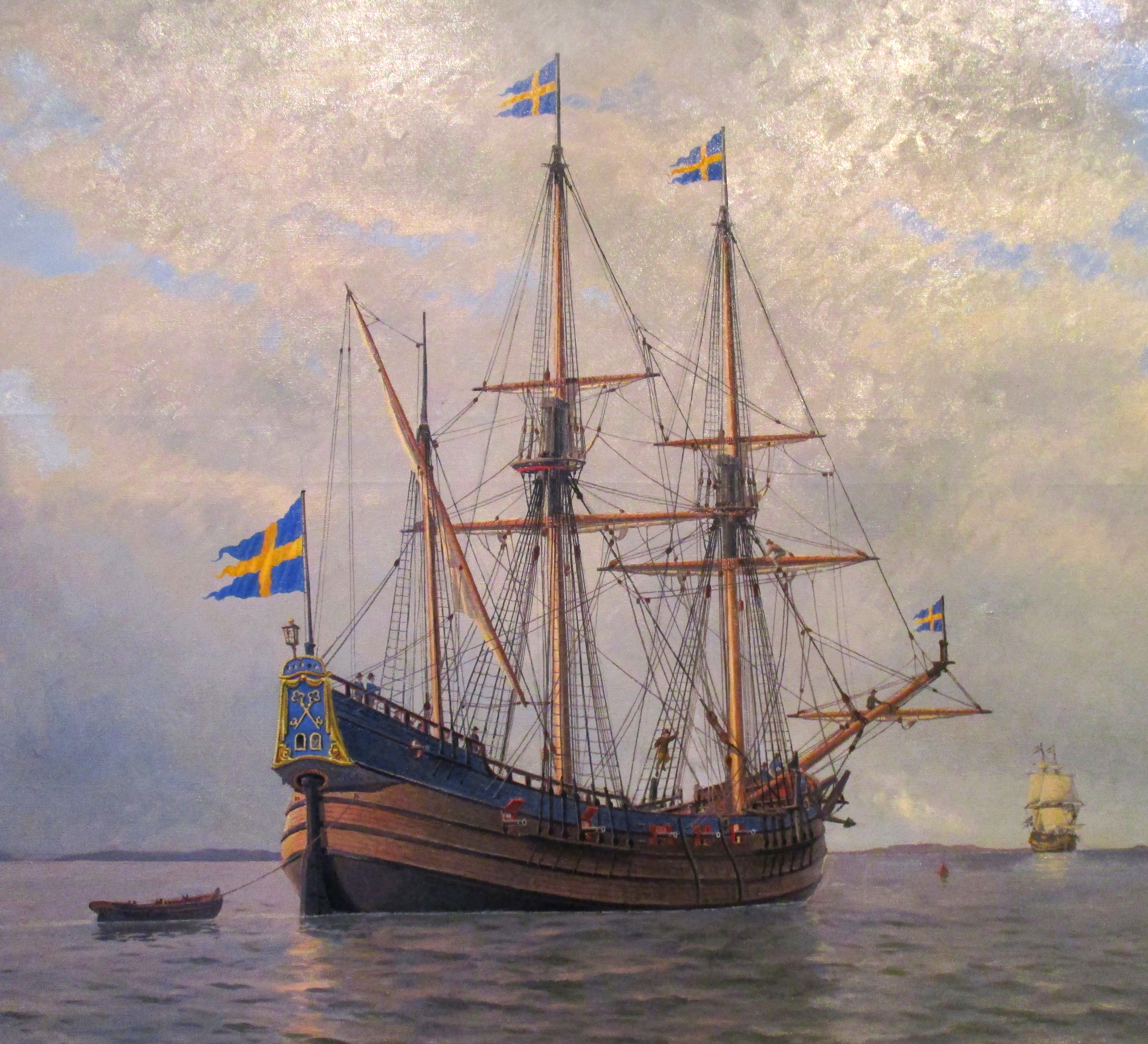
- 1922 painting of Kalmar Nyckel

History

Sweden
- Name: Kalmar Nyckel
- Owner: The Ship Company (Skeppskompaniet)
- Route: Gothenburg, Sweden — New Sweden, North America
- Launched: c. 1625
- Acquired: 1629
- Fate: Sold to Swedish Navy, 1644
- Commissioned: 1644
- Decommissioned: June 19, 1651
- Fate: Sold into merchant service, 1651.; Sunk in Dutch service 1652 (sunk by the English Navy while escorting Dutch fishing vessels in English territorial waters).

General characteristics
- Type: Pinnace
- Sail plan: Full-rigged ship
- Crew: 40 sailors & 28 soldiers (in Naval service)
- Armament: 12 × 6-pounder cannon; 2 × swivel guns

Kalmar Nyckel (Swedish for 'Key of Kalmar') was a Swedish ship (built by the Dutch) (Note: Technically speaking, she was a Naval auxiliary during this period.) famed for carrying Swedish settlers to North America in 1638, to establish the colony of New Sweden. The name Kalmar Nyckel comes from the Swedish city of Kalmar and nyckel meaning 'key' in Swedish. The name was also a tribute to Kalmar Castle which was a symbol of power during the time of the Swedish Empire when Sweden was a military great power. A replica of the ship was launched at Wilmington, Delaware, in 1997.

== History ==
Kalmar Nyckel was constructed in about 1625, and was of a design called a pinnace. The ship was originally named Sleutel (Dutch for 'key'), and to distinguish it from several other ships called Key it was known by the name of the city of Kalmar, which purchased the ship in 1629, as its contribution to a state-sponsored trading company, Skeppskompaniet. It was later purchased into the Swedish Navy. When Sweden decided to establish a trading colony in the New World under the direction of Peter Minuit, Kalmar Nyckel was chosen for the voyage. A smaller vessel, Fogel Grip (Griffin Bird), accompanied her.

The ships sailed from Gothenburg in December 1637, commanded by Jan Hindriksen van der Water, but encountered a severe storm in the North Sea and had to divert to the Netherlands for repairs. They departed on New Year's Day 1638, arriving in North America in March 1638. They built a fort on the present site of the city of Wilmington, which they named Fort Christina.

A second voyage, which departed on February 7, 1640, and arrived at Fort Christina on April 17, brought additional settlers for New Sweden. One of them was Reorus Torkillus, the first Lutheran clergyman in New Sweden. The Kalmar Nyckel made four successful round trips from Sweden to North America, a record unchallenged by any other colonial vessel.

Between colonial voyages, the ship was used by the navy as a transport and courier. She was sold out of Swedish service to Dutch merchants in 1651. At the outbreak of the First Anglo-Dutch War, she was employed as a fisheries protection vessel under Captain Dirk Vijgh. The ship was sunk off the coast of Scotland in action against an English navy squadron under General at Sea Robert Blake on July 12, 1652.

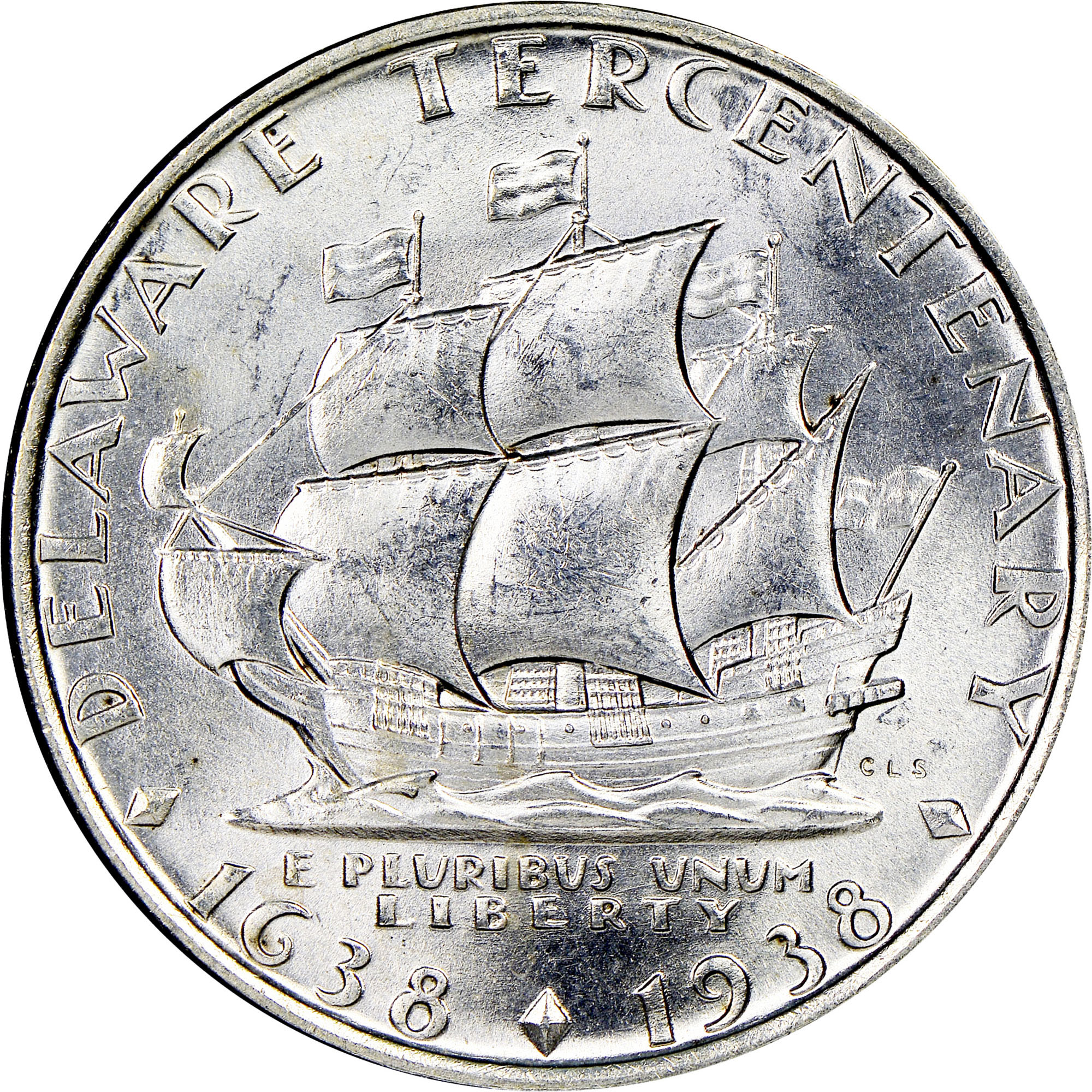
The Kalmar Nyckel on the reverse of the 1937 Delaware Tercentenary half dollar, designed by Carl L. Schmitz

== Modern replica ==
United States
- Name: Kalmar Nyckel
- Owner: Kalmar Nyckel Foundation
- Port of registry: Wilmington, Delaware
- Builder: Allen Rawl, Wilmington, Delaware
- Launched: September 28, 1997
- In service: May 9, 1998
- Identification: Call sign: WCY3589; MMSI number: 367004000
- Status: in active service, as of 2024

General characteristics
- Displacement: 298 long tons (303 t)
- Length: 141 ft (43 m) (sparred); 93 ft (28 m) (on deck); 89 ft (27 m) (at waterline)
- Beam: 25 ft (7.6 m)
- Height: 105 ft (32 m)
- Draft: 12 ft 5 in (3.78 m)
- Propulsion: 2 × 180 hp (134 kW) Caterpillar 3208 diesel engines
- Sail plan: Full-rigged ship; 7,600 sq ft (710 m^{2}) sail area
- Speed: 9.25 kn (17.13 km/h; 10.64 mph) under power; 12.5 kn (23.2 km/h; 14.4 mph) under sail
- Endurance: 6 days
- Capacity: 49 passengers
- Crew: 24

In 1986, a group of citizens of Wilmington, Delaware, established the Kalmar Nyckel Foundation, whose primary source of funding is from the taxpayers of the State of Delaware, plus donations from corporations and individuals. The foundation designed, built, and launched a replica of Kalmar Nyckel. The modern ship, designed by naval architects Thomas C. Gillmer and Iver Franzen, with additional help from Melbourne Smith, Joel Welter, and Ken Court, was built at a shipyard in Wilmington on the Christina River near the original 1638 Swedish settlers' landing site at Fort Christina. She was launched on September 28, 1997, and commissioned on May 9, 1998. The re-creation measures 94 ft (29 m) on deck and 131 ft (40 m) overall, with a 25 ft (7.6 m) beam, a 12 ft (3.7 m) draft, and a displacement of 300 tons.

The ship is operated and maintained by a volunteer staff, under the leadership of a paid captain, boatswain, and chief mate. In November 2006, the captain of the Kalmar Nyckel, David W. Hiott, who had commanded her for nine seasons, died from the effects of recurring melanoma. Captain Lauren Morgens took over on April 1, 2007, with Sharon Dounce as Port Captain/Relief Captain. Volunteers maintain the ship, run the education program, and sail her from port to port.

Since 2016, the ship has served as the official tall ship of Delaware. It was adopted as a state symbol for serving "as Delaware's seagoing ambassador both at home and at many ports of call, raising awareness of the First State for thousands who see her and come on board."

=== Ship's cats ===
Toolbox was the senior ship's cat and official warrant officer with the title of 'Captain's Assistant'. The child of a feral cat, she was born in a toolbox while the ship was under construction in 1997. She lived on the ship and therefore had the greatest accumulated sea time of any member of the crew. She is the star of two books.

Unfortunately, due to her failed eyesight, Toolbox retired from her position on Kalmar Nyckel in November 2012. A retirement party was thrown in her honor, and many past and present crew members came to celebrate her 16 years on the ship.

In addition, a number of other cats have served with Kalmar Nyckel at various times, including Clew Garnet, Lagan, Sven, Timmynocky (nautical equivalent of thingamajig) and Ditty. The last ship's cat was called Chester, a full-grey American shorthair, who retired during the COVID pandemic, and currently lives on land with a volunteer.

== Symphony ==
In 1986, composer Benjamin Lees was commissioned to write a symphony to honor the founding of Wilmington, Delaware. Lees named the resulting work Symphony No. 5: Kalmar Nyckel. The piece was nominated for a Grammy Award in 2003, following release of a recording by the German orchestra Staatsphilharmonie Rheinland-Pfalz.

== Gallery ==
Replica

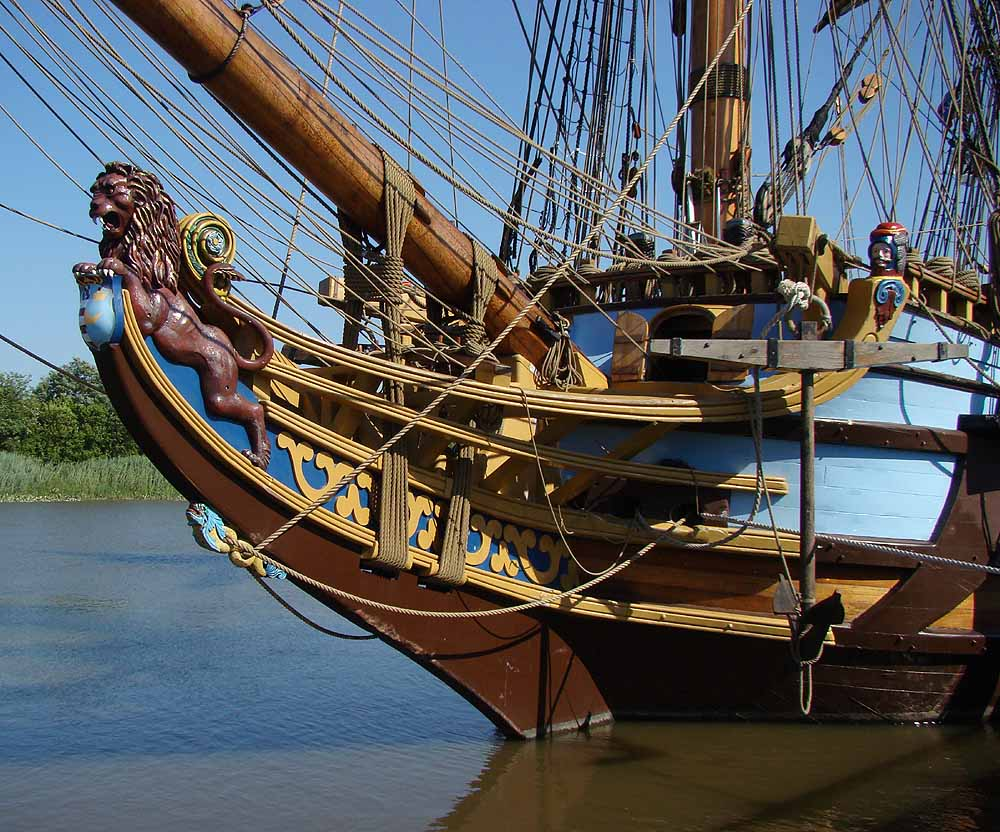
The bow of the replica Kalmar Nyckel including a two-tailed lion figurehead, one tail symbolizing the old ship and one symbolizing the new ship.

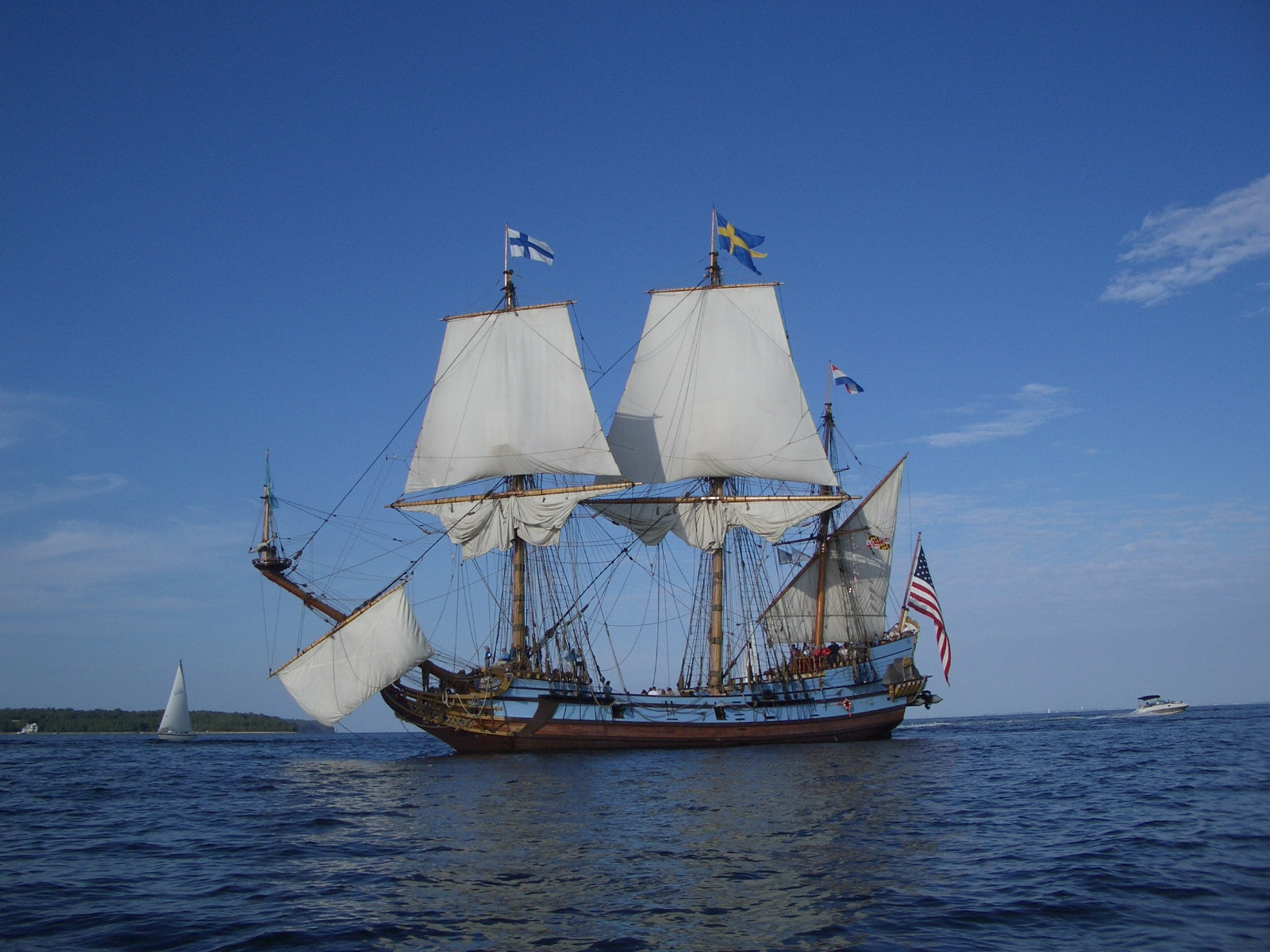
In Chesapeake Bay, 2008, flying from foretop to stern the Finnish, Swedish naval, Dutch and American flags.

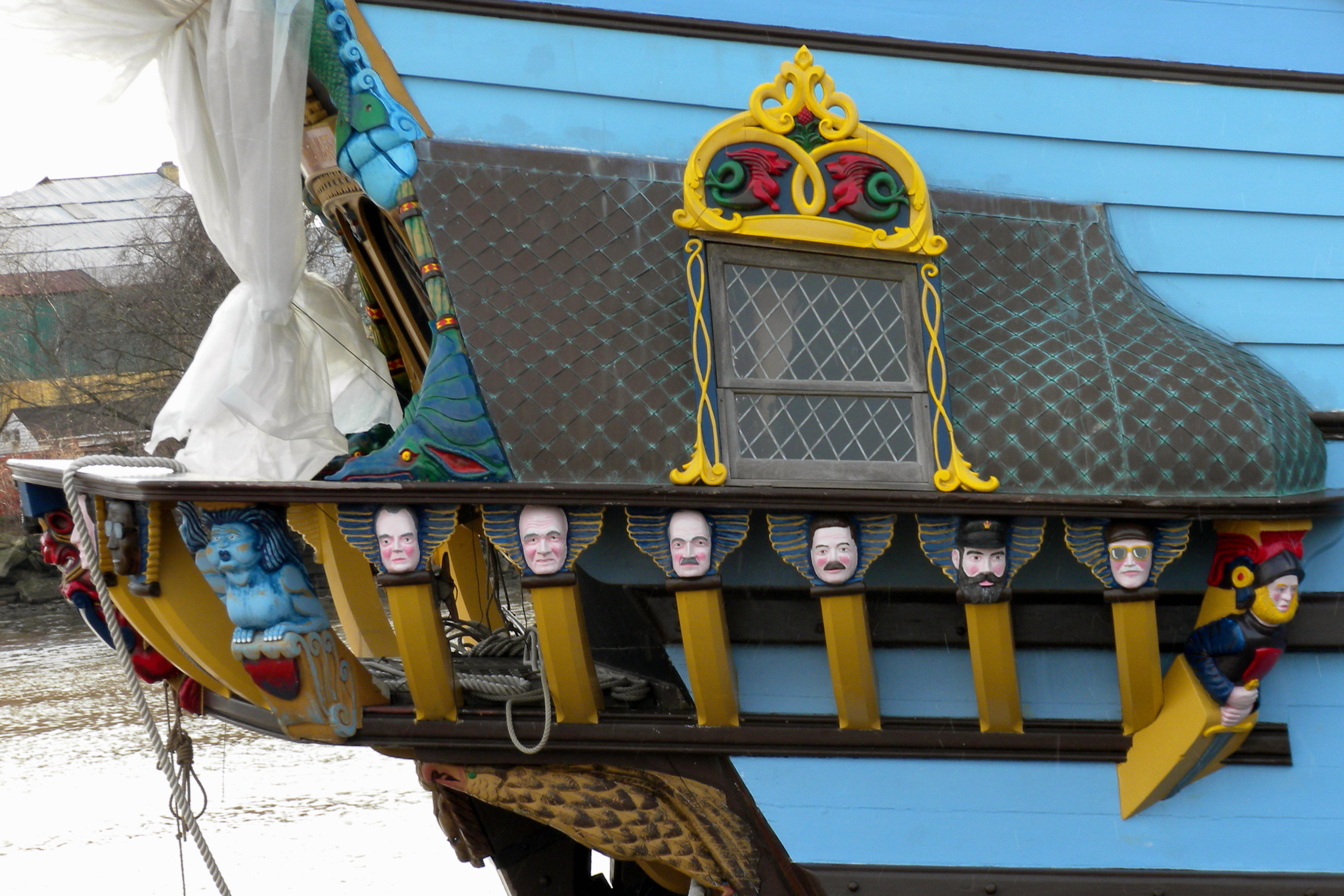
Stern of the replica

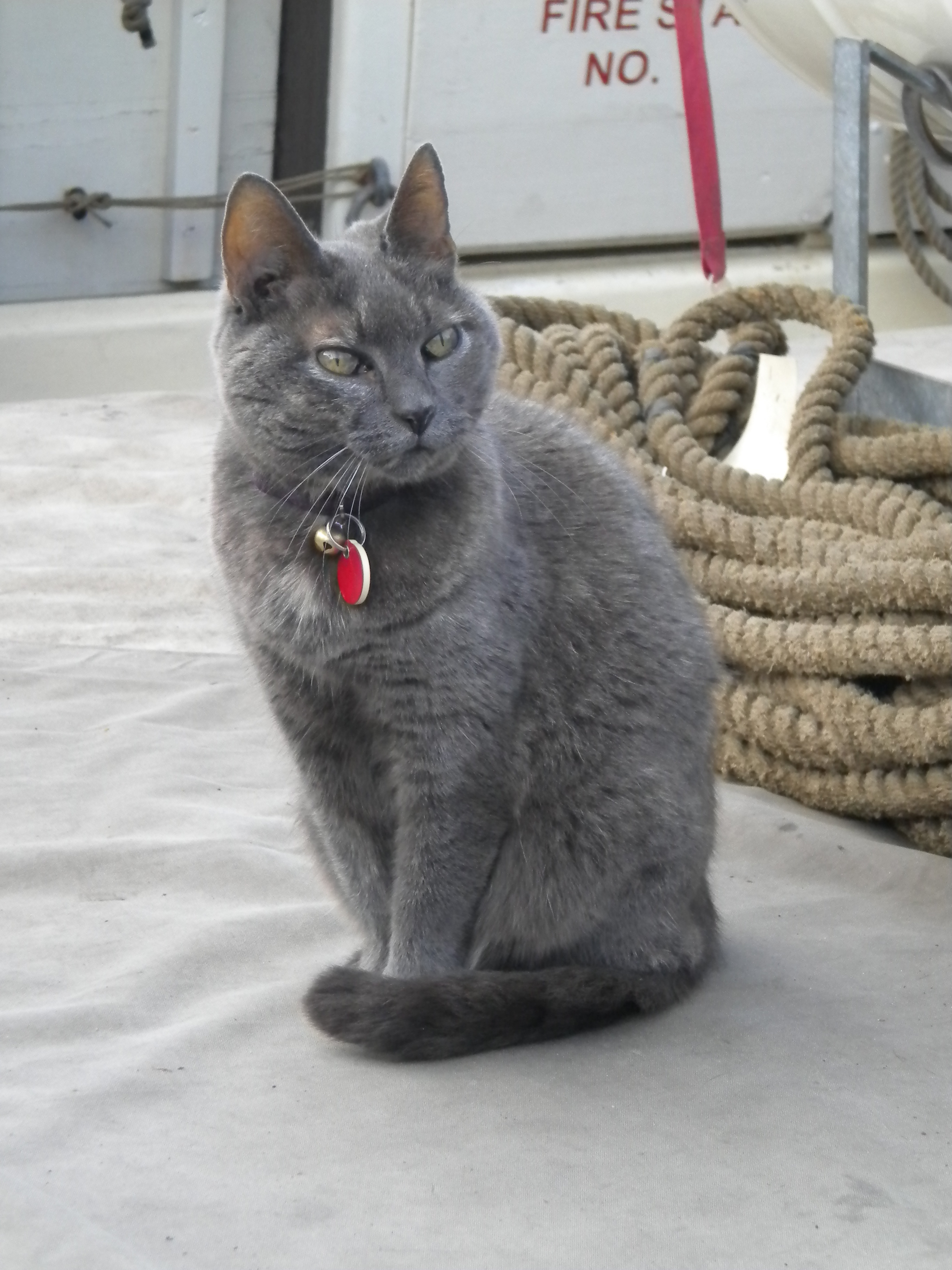
Toolbox, the former senior ship's cat of the Kalmar Nyckel

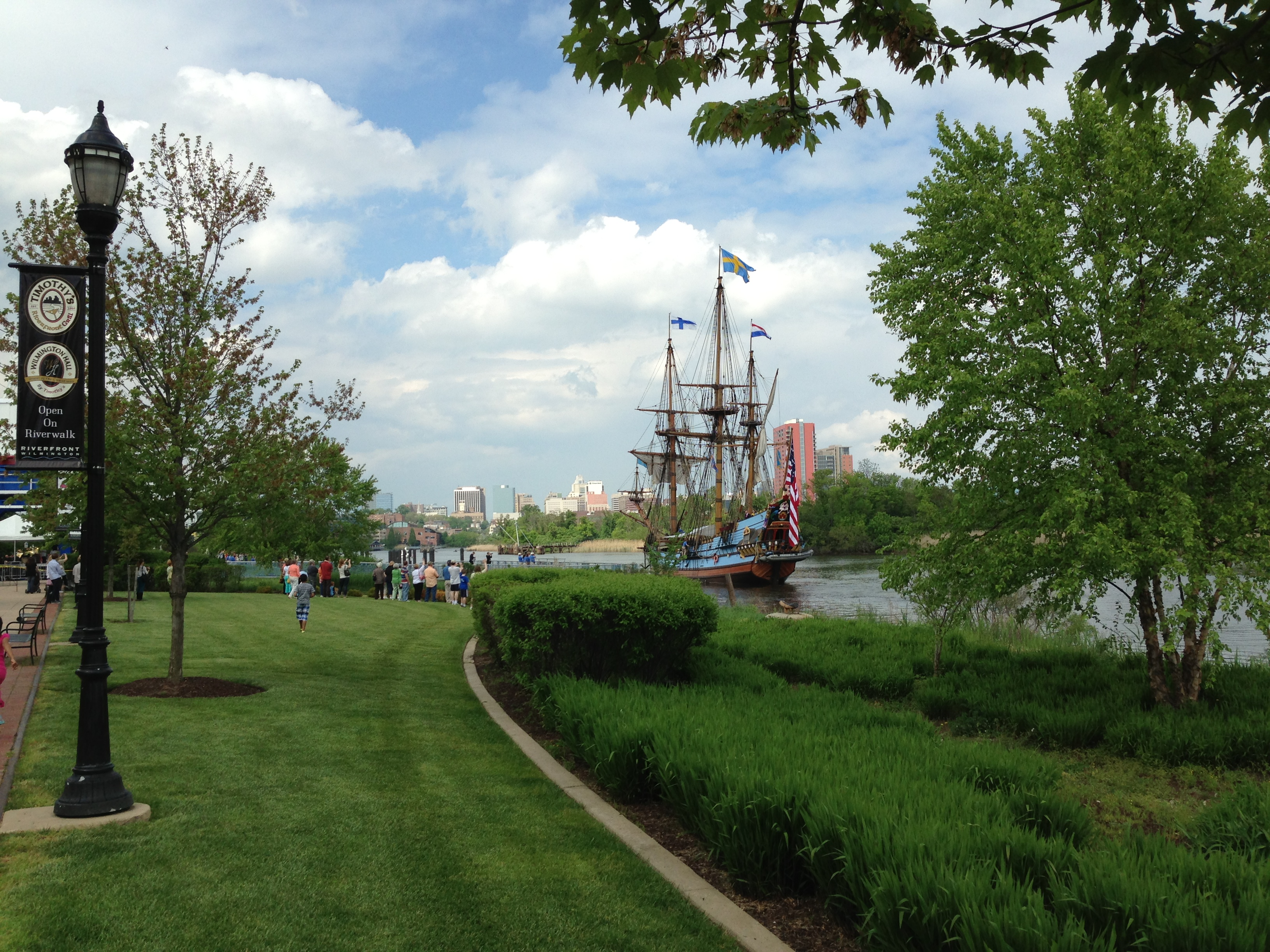
The Kalmar Nyckel with the Wilmington skyline in the background

== See also ==
- Måns Andersson
- Ship replica (including a list of ship replicas)
- Götheborg, a sailing replica of an 18th-century Swedish East Indiaman
- American Swedish Historical Museum
- Swedish colonization of the Americas
