= Delaware Colony =

Part of Pennsylvania in North America (1664–1776)

Coordinates: 39.738°N 75.558°W

Lower Counties on the Delaware
- 1664–1776
- Flag

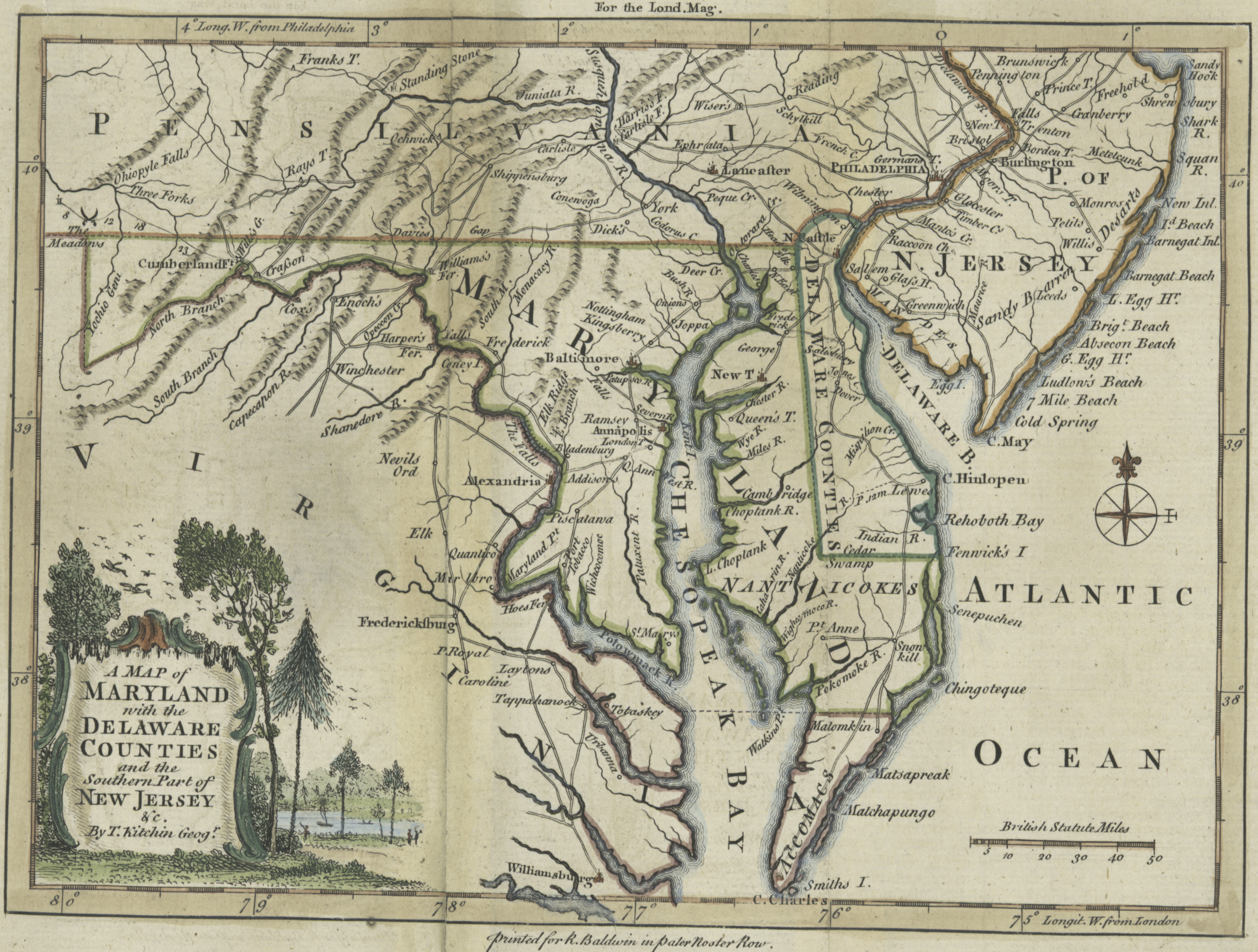
- Delaware in 1757 ("Delaware Counties", center-left)
- Status: Colony of England (1664–1707); Colony of Great Britain (1707–1776)
- Capital: New Castle
- Common languages: English, Dutch, Munsee, Unami
- Government: Semiautonomous proprietary colony
- Proprietor
  - 1664–1682: Territory contested
  - 1682–1718: William Penn (first)
  - 1775–1776: John Penn (last)
- Legislature: General Assembly
- History
  - Established: 1664
  - Independence: 1776
- Currency: Delaware pound
Preceded by	Succeeded by
New Netherland	Delaware
- Today part of: United States

The Lower Counties on the Delaware was a semi-autonomous region of the proprietary Province of Pennsylvania in North America. Although not royally sanctioned, Delaware consisted of the three counties on the west bank of the Delaware River Bay.

In the early 17th century, the area was inhabited by Lenape and possibly Assateague Indian tribes. The first European settlers were Swedes, who established the colony of New Sweden at Fort Christina in present-day Wilmington, Delaware, in 1638. The Dutch captured the colony in 1655 and annexed it to New Netherland to the north. England subsequently took control of it from the Dutch in 1664. In 1682, William Penn, the Quaker proprietor of the Province of Pennsylvania to the north, leased the three lower counties on the Delaware River from James, the Duke of York, who went on to become King James II.

The three lower counties on the Delaware River were governed as part of the Province of Pennsylvania from 1682 to 1701, when the lower counties petitioned for and were granted an independent colonial legislature; the two colonies shared the same governor until 1776. The English colonists who settled in Delaware were mainly Quakers. In the first half of the 18th century, New Castle and Philadelphia became the primary ports of entry to the new world for a quarter of a million Irish Protestant immigrants from Ulster, referred to as Scotch-Irish in America and Ulster Scots in Ireland. Delaware had no established religion at this time.

The American Revolutionary War began in April 1775, and on June 15, 1776, the Delaware Assembly voted to break all ties with Great Britain (and, simultaneously, with Pennsylvania), creating the independent State of Delaware. On July 4, 1776, Delaware joined 12 other British colonies to form the United States of America.

== Dutch and Swedish settlements ==
Historical population
Year	Pop.	±%
1670	700	—
1680	1,005	+43.6%
1690	1,482	+47.5%
1700	2,470	+66.7%
1710	3,645	+47.6%
1720	5,385	+47.7%
1730	9,170	+70.3%
1740	19,870	+116.7%
1750	28,704	+44.5%
1760	33,250	+15.8%
1770	35,496	+6.8%
1774	37,219	+4.9%
1780	45,385	+21.9%
Source: 1670–1760; 1774 1770–1780

From the early Dutch settlement in 1631 to the colony's rule by Pennsylvania in 1682, the land that later became the U.S. state of Delaware changed hands many times. Because of this, Delaware became a heterogeneous society made up of individuals who were diverse in country of origin and religion.

The first European exploration of what would become known as the Delaware Valley was made by the Dutch ship Halve Maen under the command of Henry Hudson in 1609. He was searching for what was believed to be a Northwest Passage to Asia. Hudson sailed into what now is the Delaware Bay. He named it the South River, but this would later change after Samuel Argall came across the mouth of the river in 1610, after being blown off course. Argall later renamed this waterway as the river Delaware, after Thomas West, Lord De La Warr, the second governor of Virginia.

Follow-up expeditions by Cornelius May in 1613 and Cornelius Hendrickson in 1614 mapped the shoreline of what would become the colony and state of Delaware for inclusion in the New Netherland colony. Initial Dutch settlement was centered up the Delaware River at Fort Nassau at Big Timber Creek, south of what is now Gloucester City, New Jersey.

Neither the Dutch nor the English showed any early interest in establishing settlement on this land. It was not until 1629 that agents of the Dutch West India Company, Gillis Hossitt and Jacob Jansz, arrived to negotiate with the Native Americans to purchase land for a colony. (The Dutch always purchased land from the Native Americans, rather than take it by force, but the peoples had differing concepts of property and use. The Native Americans often considered the Dutch "payments" to be gifts in keeping with their Native custom, and expected to share use of the common land.) Hossitt and Jansz secured a treaty granting the Dutch a parcel of land running along the shore eight Dutch miles long and half a Dutch mile deep (roughly 29 by just under 2 US miles). This nearly coincided with the length of the coast of modern Sussex and Kent counties in Delaware.

In 1631 the Dutch sent a group of twenty-eight men to build a fort inside Cape Henlopen on Lewes Creek to establish the Zwaanendael Colony. This first colony was intended to take advantage of the large whale population in the bay and to produce whale oil. A cultural misunderstanding with the Native Americans resulted in their killing of these 28 colonists before a year had passed. Patroon David Pietersz. de Vries arrived shortly thereafter with an additional 50 settlers. Although he concluded a treaty with the Indians, de Vries, his partners in Holland, and the Dutch West India Company decided the location was too dangerous for immediate colonization. They took the additional settlers to New Amsterdam (New York) instead.

In March 1638, the Swedish colony of New Sweden was established as the first permanent European settlement in Delaware. The Kalmar Nyckel anchored at a rocky point on the Minquas Kill. Today this site is called Swedes' Landing; it is located in Wilmington, Delaware. The expedition was led, and had been instigated by Peter Minuit, the founding governor of New Netherland. He had been dismissed by the Dutch West India Company, which operated the colony as a concession. Minuit resented the company and was well aware that the Dutch had little settlement in the Zuyd (Delaware) river valley. New Sweden was a multicultural affair, with Finns, Dutch, Walloons (Belgians), and Germans, in addition to Swedes among the settlers.

The first outpost of the Swedish settlement was named Fort Christina (now Wilmington) after Queen Christina of Sweden. The Swedes introduced log cabin construction to the New World and the humble house form was later spread to the American backcountry by Scotch-Irish immigrants who entered the colony through the port of New Castle. Swedish colonial Governor Johan Björnsson Printz administered the colony of New Sweden from 1643 to 1653. He was succeeded by Johan Classon Risingh, the last governor of New Sweden. The Dutch had never accepted the Swedish colony as legitimate, and the Dutch West India Company competed with the officials and backers of New Sweden. In 1651, New Netherland Governor Peter Stuyvesant had Fort Nassau dismantled and reassembled downriver of Fort Christina as Fort Casimir. This meant that the Dutch effectively encircled the Swedish colony. The Swedes abandoned Fort Beversreede, a short-lived attempt to establish a foothold at the end of the Great Minquas Path (in modern Philadelphia).

Three years later, the New Sweden colony attacked and seized Fort Casimir, renaming it Fort Trinity. The struggle finally came to an end in September 1655. With the Second Great Northern War raging in Europe, Stuyvesant assembled an army and naval squadron sufficient to capture the Swedish forts, thus re-establishing control of the colony. The Dutch renamed Fort Casimir/Trinity as New Amstel (later translated to New Castle). It became their center for fur trading with Native Americans and the colony's administration headquarters. The area's European population grew rapidly.

== English conquest ==
In 1664, after English Colonel Richard Nicolls captured New Amsterdam, Robert Carr was sent to the Delaware River settlements. He took over New Amstel, pillaging it and mistreating its settlers, some of whom he sold into slavery in Virginia. Carr translated the name of the post from Dutch into English and it has been known since as New Castle. Carr and his troops continued down the shore, ravaging and burning settlements, including a Mennonite utopian community led by Pieter Corneliszoon Plockhoy near present-day Lewes, Delaware. This effectively ended the Dutch rule of the colony and, for that matter, ended their claims to any land in colonial North America. The English took over New Netherland, renaming it New York. Delaware was thenceforth claimed by New York under a Deputy of the Duke of York from 1664 to 1682, but neither the Duke nor his colonists controlled it. The proprietors of Maryland took action to take advantage of this situation. A former indentured servant named Marcus Jacobson also took advantage of the uncertainty and tried to rally former Swedish settlers to restore Swedish control. This was the 1669 Revolt of the Long Swede.

== New Castle, Kent, and Sussex Counties, Pennsylvania ==
The area now known as Delaware was owned by William Penn, the Quaker owner of Pennsylvania. In contemporary documents from the early Revolutionary period, the area is generally referred to as "The Three Lower Counties on the Delaware River" (Lower Counties on Delaware) or by the names of the three counties.

After William Penn was granted the province of Pennsylvania by King Charles II in 1681, he asked for and later received the lands of Delaware from the Duke of York. Penn had a very hard time governing Delaware because the economy and geology resembled those of the Chesapeake Bay colonies more than that of Pennsylvania. The lowland areas were developed for tobacco plantations and dependent on enslaved Africans and African Americans for labor. Penn attempted to merge the governments of Pennsylvania and the lower counties of Delaware. Representatives from each area clashed strongly and, in 1701 Penn agreed to allow two assemblies to be elected and conduct their separate affairs. Delawareans would meet in New Castle, and Pennsylvanians would gather in Philadelphia. Delaware, like Philadelphia and more so than Maryland, continued to be a melting pot of sorts. It was home to Swedes, Finns, Dutch, and French, in addition to the English, who constituted the dominant culture.

== Sources ==
- Johnson, Amandus. The Swedish Settlements on the Delaware, 1638–1664 (Philadelphia: Swedish Colonial Society, 1911)
- Weslager, C. A. A Man and His Ship: Peter Minuit and the Kalmar Nyckel ( Kalmar Nyckel Foundation. Wilmington, Delaware. 1989)
