= Armegot Printz =

Armegot Printz Papegoja
- Born: 1625
- Died: 1695 (aged 69–70)

Armegot Printz (1625–1695) was a Swedish noble. She was the daughter of Johan Björnsson Printz, governor of New Sweden, and she married her father's successor, governor Johan Papegoja. She is the most well documented and known woman of New Sweden.

== Life ==
Armegot Printz was born in Bottnaryd, Småland, Sweden. She was the daughter of the Swedish noble Johan Printz, colonel lieutenant of the Västgöta cavalry, and the German Elisabet Bock. She, as well as her mother and siblings, accompanied her father to Germany during his participation in the Thirty Years' War in the army of Gustav II Adolf of Sweden. In 1642, after her father's appointment as governor of the Swedish colony New Sweden in America, she followed her father to America in the company of her siblings and stepmother, where they arrived in February 1643.

=== New Sweden ===
In New Sweden, her father had The Printzhof manor built as their residence at Tinicum Island. In 1645, the poor noble Johan Papegoja arrived to the colony with permission from Per Brahe to marry Armegot. After the marriage took place, her spouse was given a position in the colony by her father and the couple settled in Fort Christina, where they had four sons. Armegot Printz was described as dominant, proud and willful, and was said to have totally dominated the relationship. In 1653, Papepgoja replaced her father as governor so Armegot was given the position of first lady of the colony.

When her husband was replaced by Johan Risingh and returned to Sweden, Armegot remained in the colony to manage her father's properties. She also stayed in Fort Christina, where she kept control of the staff and retained the position of first lady until Risingh managed to have her removed to Printzhof. After this, five officials turned in their notices and wished to join Armegot's service instead. Risingh persuaded them to stay, but blamed the conflict on the influential position of Armegot and wrote to Sweden for a wife to undermine her status.

=== Dutch ===
In 1655, however, New Sweden was conquered by the Dutch. The Printzhof, where Armegot had allowed her neighbours to hide their valuables, was looted.

When her possession of Printzhof was questioned by the Dutch, she had her ownership of Printzhof, as well as her possession of Fort Tinicum, confirmed by the Dutch governor in New Amsterdam. In 1662, she sold Printzhof to Dutch merchant Joost de la Grange (1623-1664). She travelled to the Netherlands to collect her payment, but was not paid. She visited her family in Sweden, and upset the local church authorities by her refusal to submit to her husband. In 1663, she returned to America to claim the payment for Printzhof, which was now owned by de la Grange's widow's new husband Andrew Carr. The process was drawn out for years. Meanwhile, she resided at Printztorp (now Chester, Pennsylvania), where she managed an inn, a tavern and a liquor distillery.

=== Revolt of the Long Swede ===
Armegot was an early support of Marcus Jacobson as he tried to rally support for his Revolt of the Long Swede. She was later arrested and released on bail.

=== Death ===
In 1675, Printzhof was given back to her, and the year after, she sold it and returned to Sweden. She spent her remaining life travelling between the estates of her children and died at Läckö Castle.

== Related Reading ==
- Benson, Adolph B. and Naboth Hedin, eds. (1938) Swedes in America, 1638-1938 ( New Haven, CT: Yale University Press) ISBN 978-0-8383-0326-9
- Johnson, Amandus (1927). The Swedes on the Delaware (Philadelphia: International Printing Company)
- Ward, Christopher (1930) Dutch and Swedes on the Delaware, 1609- 1664 (University of Pennsylvania Press)
- Weslager, C. A. (1988) New Sweden on the Delaware 1638–1655 (Wilmington, Delaware: Middle Atlantic Press)
