= Swedish Colonial Society =

Seal of the Swedish Colonial Society

The Swedish Colonial Society is America's oldest organization dedicated to the study and preservation of New Sweden history. In addition to collecting and publishing research on Swedes and Finns in America, the Society maintains parks, monuments, and memorials of historic sites. A unique aspect of the group is its connection to Sweden's royal family and the Swedish government.

== History ==
In 1906, Dr. Amandus Johnson returned from study in Europe with a wealth of material concerning New Sweden, and was determined that the history of the settlement be recorded. In 1907, Johnson met with Swedish officials in the United States to generate support for the creation of a national organization and, in 1908, several informal meetings with prominent individuals who shared his vision were held at the Historical Society of Pennsylvania. On January 20, 1909, the first organizational meeting of the Swedish Colonial Society took place. In the same year, the Society's founders sought the patronage of the King of Sweden. An invitation to King Gustav V was engraved on a solid silver scroll and sent to Sweden through the Swedish ambassador. On July 13, the King accepted the invitation to become the Society's first High Patron.

Early membership roles in the group were filled with the names of many of Philadelphia and Wilmington's leading families, scholars, and industrialists. By 1926, Amandus Johnson had gathered funds from across the country for what would become the American Swedish Historical Museum, a national museum dedicated to the achievements of Swedish immigrants. The Society determined that the project was beyond its own scope, choosing to focus instead on the time before 1800 and to let the museum concentrate on later years. Nonetheless, SCS supported its construction and, by June of that year, the cornerstone of the building was placed. Presiding at the ceremony were then-Crown Prince Gustaf Adolf and his wife, the Princess Victoria.

While the Society was rather exclusive in its founding, the first female associate member was received in 1909 and, by 1929, women were accorded regular membership. In the 1930s, however, there were still only 193 members. Meetings were held in the librarian's office of the Historical Society of Pennsylvania, with an average attendance of seven. The meetings, lasting just over an hour, consisted mainly of receiving new members and accepting resignations.

The Society entered a new era under Colonel Frank W. Melvin's tenure as Governor (1936–1946), a period which led to six projects being accepted by the Works Progress Administration. During this time, the Governor sought to turn the Society into a patriotic organization as, during World War II, anyone who supported Swedish neutrality was suspect. The effort proved too controversial, however, and was not approved.

Today, the Society is primarily devoted to research and historic preservation. With the increased interest in colonial history, membership has grown and now totals roughly 1,000 people from across the United States and an ever-increasing number of foreign countries. The current Governor is John B. Tepe Jr., Esq., who began his tenure in early 2018.

== Preservation ==
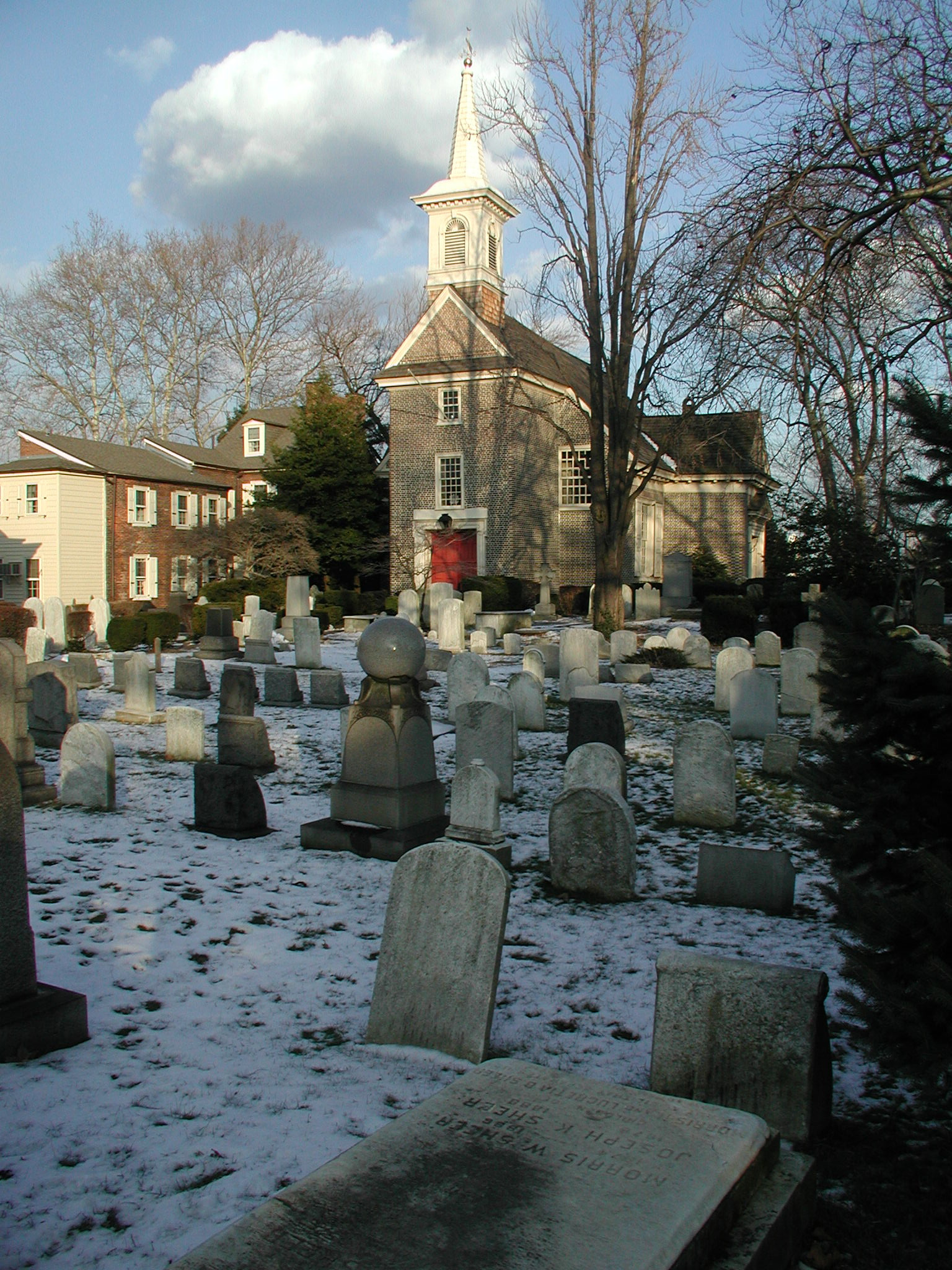
Gloria Dei (Old Swedes') Church

One of the earliest projects of the Society was the 1923 creation of a monument to Governor Johan Printz on Philadelphia's Tinicum Island. The organization assumed responsibility for the property surrounding the monument, supervising the grading and seeding necessary to improve the land's poor condition. A professional archaeological investigation was then conducted on the site, leading to the discovery of the footprint of Printzhof, the governor's residence. Ownership of the area has since been given back to the Tinicum Township.

Following this, the organization pursued an effort to have Gloria Dei (Old Swedes') Church recognized as a National Historic Landmark, a designation that it achieved in 1946, being the first American religious building to do so.

In 2003, the Society sponsored the Rambo Apple Project, designed to bring the Rambo apple tree species back to Sweden. The tree had been extinct since 1709-10 following a severe winter in Sweden, but had survived in America because a colonist took its seeds to New Sweden in 1640. The first planting in Sweden was financed by the King, and Rambo apple trees were planted in a number of significant locations in Sweden and America.

The Society has also worked with the Pennsylvania state government in preserving the Morton Homestead, valued for its ties to John Morton, a signer of the Declaration of Independence.

More recently, the Society oversaw the restoration of two Gustavus Hesselius portraits relating to New Sweden — one of Pastor Erik Björk and the other of his American wife, Christina Stalcop. These 1712 paintings are historically significant as the first of their kind in the Delaware Valley. Current projects for the organization include assisting with the preservation of Bartram's Garden in Philadelphia and the rescue of the New Sweden Farmstead Museum in Bridgeton, New Jersey.

== Research ==
Over the past century, the Society's research has become the foundation for the study of New Sweden Colony, and the group remains the foremost forum on the subject. Recently, they have become involved with the Gloria Dei Records Project, an effort to assemble, translate, and publish all of the colonial records of the church. The records constitute the major "missing link" in chronicling the history of Swedish settlement and culture on the Delaware River, spanning from the 1640s, when the first Swedish church was founded at Tinicum Island, to 1787. The Society is also involved with genealogical research, and reserves a genealogist within the organization to study New Sweden family history and the ancestry of members applying for Forefather Member status. The Craig Collection, a complete library of genealogical books and lineage papers relating to the families of New Sweden, is also maintained by the Society.

Its historical archives are stored at the Lutheran Theological Seminary at Philadelphia, where they are available for viewing. The archives program began in 2000 and now amounts to more than 42 linear feet of materials, a map collection, and framed paintings, including a large copy of the 17th-century portrait of Governor Printz.

Together with the American Swedish Historical Museum, the Society also hosts the New Sweden History Conference, which every year presents a symposium devoted to an aspect of the history or culture of the New Sweden Colony.

== Publications ==
Swedish Colonial News

=== Periodicals ===
- Swedish Colonial News - the official newsletter of SCS, published biannually and mailed to all members; it contains articles about historical events and buildings related to the New Sweden Colony, Forefather family profiles with descendants listed, and news of upcoming events.
- Swedish American Genealogist - a quarterly journal devoted to Swedish-American biography, genealogy, and personal history.

=== Books ===
- The Swedish Settlements on the Delaware, 1638-1664 by Amandus Johnson, PhD
- The 1693 Census of the Swedes on the Delaware by Peter Stebbins Craig, J.D.
- The 1671 Census of the Delaware by Peter Stebbins Craig, J.D.
- The Faces of New Sweden: Erik Björk, Christina Stalcop & America's First Portrait Painter by Hans Ling
- Colonial Records of the Swedish Churches in Pennsylvania edited by Peter Stebbins Craig, J.D. and The Rev. Dr. Kim-Eric Williams
- The Descendants of Jöran Kyn of New Sweden by Gregory B. Keen, LL.D.
- Johan Classon Rising, The Last Governor of New Sweden by Amandus Johnson, PhD
- The Journey of Justus Falckner by The Rev. Dr. Kim-Eric Williams
- The Eight Old Swedes' Churches of New Sweden by The Rev. Dr. Kim-Eric Williams
- New Sweden on the Delaware: A Photographic Tour of the Historic Sites of America's First Swedes and Finns by Kenneth S. Peterson and Kim-Eric Williams, 2013

== Scholarships ==
The Society, through the University of Pennsylvania, endows the Amandus Johnson Prize, a travel grant to study in Sweden for a student who excels in language study. In 2023 the prize was awarded to then College sophomore Liam Hoare.

== Royal Family Affiliation ==
The reigning King of Sweden traditionally assumes the role of High Patron, a practice begun in 1909, while the Swedish Ambassador occupies the Patron position. The current High Patron, King Carl XVI Gustaf, took on the role upon assuming the Swedish throne in 1974. In 2003, Crown Princess Victoria became Deputy High Patron.

The royal family has recognized the contributions of the Swedish Colonial Society by awarding five of the present twenty-five Councillors with an Order of the Polar Star.

== Governors ==
Name	Tenure
The Honorable Marcel A. Viti	1909–1921
Gregory B. Keen, L.L.D.	1921–1927
Colonel Henry D. Paxton, Esq.	1927–1932
Dr. Albert Duncan Yocum	1932–1936
Colonel Frank W. Melvin, Esq.	1936–1946
Branton Holstein Henderson	1946–1948
Charles Sinnickson, Esq.	1948–1950
Issac Crawford Sutton, Esq.	1950–1952
Colonel Robert Morris	1952–1954
Frederic Swing Crispin	1954–1956
Dr. Samuel Booth Sturgis	1956–1958
Dr. Amandus Johnson	1958–1960
C. Colket Wilson Jr.	1960–1962
Alan Corson Jr.	1962–1964
Charles Paist, III	1964–1966
Donald E. Hogeland, Esq.	1966–1968
Allen Lesley. Esq.	1968–1970
Conrad Wilson	1970–1972
The Rev. Dr. John Craig Roak	1972–1975
David Hillman	1975–1977
Dr. Erik G. M. Tornqvist	1977–1982
Herbert E. Hanson Gullberg	1982–1984
Dr. Benkt Wennberg	1984–1986
Dr. Erik G. M. Tornqvist	1986–1989
Wallace F. Richter	1989–1993
John C. Cameron, Esq.	1993–1995
Commander John W. Widfeldt	1995–1997
William Benjamin Neal	1997–2000
Herbert Ripley Rambo	2000–2003
Ronald A. Hendrickson, Esq.	2003–2005
The Rev. Dr. Kim-Eric Williams	2005–2009
Herbert Ripley Rambo	2009–2010
Margaret Sooy Bridwell	2010–2014
Michael R. D'Andrea	2014–2018
John B. Tepe Jr., Esq.	2018–present
