= Capture of Fort Casimir =

Coordinates: 39°39′42″N 75°33′32″W

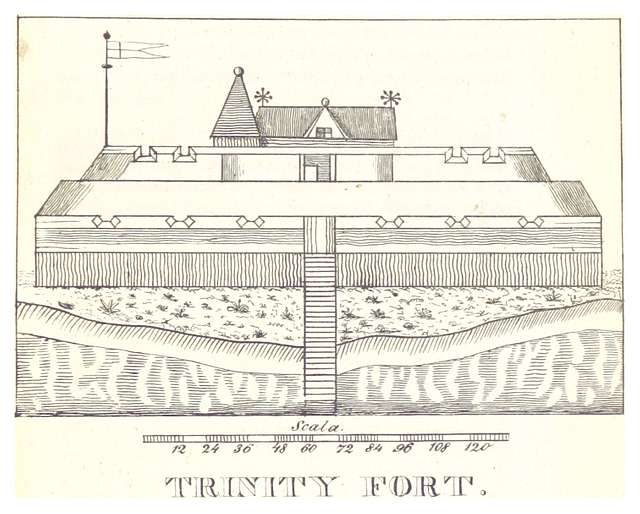
- Fort Casimir (later known as Fort Trinity), New Sweden
Date	31 May 1654
Location	Fort Casimir, Delaware
Result	Swedish victory
Territorial changes	Delaware River falls into Swedish control

Belligerents
(yes) Swedish Empire; New Sweden	Dutch Republic; New Netherland

Commanders and leaders
(Swedish Empire) Johan Risingh	(Dutch Republic) Gerrit Bicker (surrendered)

Strength
20–30 men 1 sloop	10–12 men

Casualties and losses
Unknown	Entire garrison

The capture of Fort Casimir was an intercolonial confrontation between New Sweden and New Netherland in Delaware in 1654. A Swedish force of 1 sloop and 20 to 30 armed soldiers under Johan Risingh attacked the Dutch-controlled Fort Casimir under Sergeant Gerrit Bicker and a garrison of 10–12 men on 31 May 1654. It ended with a Swedish victory, and the fort was captured by Johan Risingh.

== Prelude ==
In July 1651, Petrus Stuyvesant decided to go on a voyage to the Delaware River to construct a new fortress, which would replace Fort Nassau and Fort Beversreede. He began by purchasing all the land south of Fort Christina, all the way to Bombay Hook, from the Native Americans. Then he chose a "reasonably suitable place about a mile from the Swedish fort Christina" in order to "build a fort named Casimier" which was furnished with "people and ammunition of war, according to circumstances."

== Capture ==
During the First Anglo-Dutch War, which began in 1652, the Swedes decided to try to conquer Fort Casimir. When the Swedish commander, Johan Risingh, first arrived on the Delaware River in late May 1654, he sailed a ship up to the fort and sent out a sloop with 20–30 men. Since there was no gunpowder in the fortress, the Dutch commander, Gerrit Bicker, decided to surrender the fort to the Swedes. He waited for the Swedish soldiers outside of the fortress, "in front of the gate", which was left open. Next, Bicker accompanied the Swedes without giving any orders to his men, where the Swedes easily overpowered the Dutch garrison of around 10–12 soldiers.

== Aftermath ==
After the Swedes had conquered the fortress, it was renamed to Fort Trefaldigheten (Fort Trinity), after Trinity Sunday. Risingh also gave the newly renamed fortress a strong garrison, which allowed the Swedes to control the Delaware River. The capture of the fortress also effectively cut the Fortress of Nassau from the sea.
