= New Sweden Farmstead Museum =

Former farm museum in Bridgeton, New Jersey

Coordinates: 39°26′05″N 75°14′12″W

- Established: 1988
- Dissolved: circa 2015

The New Sweden Farmstead Museum was an open-air museum in Bridgeton, New Jersey, United States. A recreation of a 17th-century Swedish farmstead, it was located in City Park, and served as a historical remembrance of the history of the Swedish and Finnish people who arrived as part of the colony of New Sweden in early America. Originally opened in 1988, it operated as a living museum for many years. As funding and attendance declined, the log buildings at the complex fell into disrepair, requiring it to close.

Beginning in 2011, fundraising and restoration efforts allowed a partial re-open. Later, a decision was made to move the museum's buildings to Governor Printz Park in the community of Essington, Tinicum Township, Pennsylvania. On June 1, 2019, the newly restored residence building was dedicated in the park, and the remaining six building were reconstructed during 2020.

== New Sweden ==
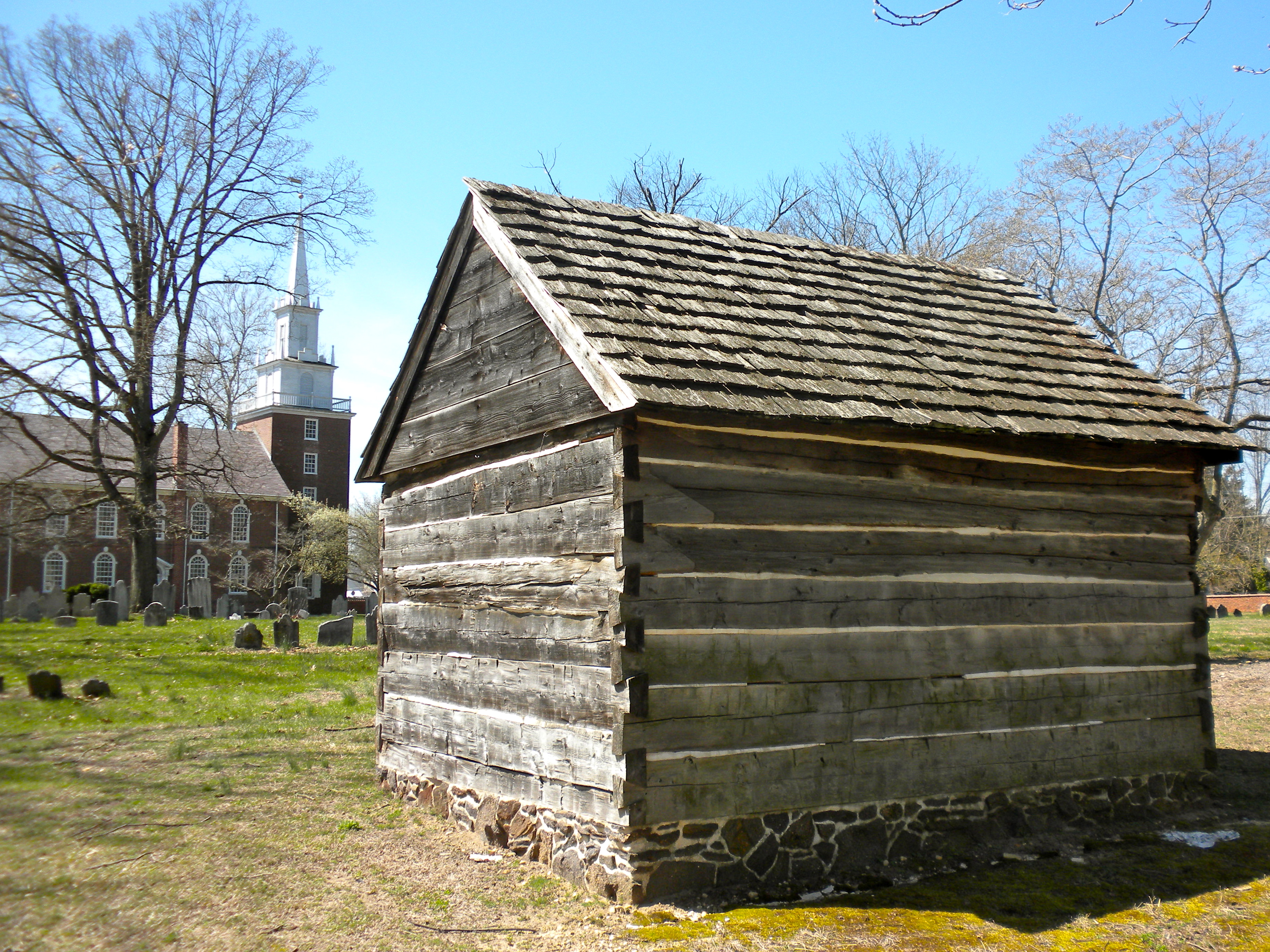
Although not part of the New Sweden Farmstead Museum, the Mortonson-Van Leer Log Cabin in Swedesboro is a log building typical of New Sweden

In 1638, Swedes and Finns arrived in the Delaware Valley on the ships the Kalmar Nyckel and Fogel Grip to found the colony of New Sweden. Tradition holds that a settlement was first planted by a group of Finns in and around Finns Point almost immediately. among them, the family of Anders Sinicka, whose surname has many variations. In 1643 they built Fort Nya Elfsborg near Salem. Spreading across South Jersey into what is now Salem, Cumberland, and Gloucester they built farming communities along its rivers and streams. Eric Pålsson Mullica was an early settler remembered in many regional placenames. By 1649 villages at Sveaborg, now Swedesboro, New Jersey, and Nya Stockholm, today's Bridgeport, where established. It has been suggested that the presence of Forest Finns was influential in the development of log building in the USA.

There are several original structures in the region from the era which are among some of the oldest buildings in New Jersey and some of the oldest non-Spanish built in the United States. Among them are the Caesar Hoskins Log Cabin, the C. A. Nothnagle Log House, the Mortonson-Van Leer Log Cabin (originally located on Raccoon Creek and moved to Old Swedes Church in Swedesboro), the Swedish Granary and the Swedish Cabin at Hancock House.

== Construction and opening ==
The New Sweden Company, Incorporated was established in 1983 with the mission recreate a village to commemorate the 350th anniversary of the arrival of the European colonists. The project was originally intended to be built in Salem but after some controversy it was decided the locate it in Bridgeton.

The museum was built in 1987. A team of experts associated with the Riksförbundet för Hembygdvärd (National Association for Homestead Care) from Sweden supervised the on-site construction of the log structures using traditional materials and methods to replicate a 17th-century farmstead, or gård. It comprised a farmhouse/residence, a blacksmith shop, a storehouse, a Granary (threshing barn), a stable, a barn with outhouse, a sauna and a Smokehouse. Furnaces, chimneys, and fireplaces were also authentically constructed. The collection included furnishings, farm equipment, and other artifacts genuinely of Swedish-Finnish origin which by 2011 had been inventoried and moved from temporary to climate controlled storage.

The museum was formally opened on April 14, 1988 by Carl XVI Gustaf and Queen Silvia of Sweden accompanied by Governor of New Jersey Thomas Kean and his wife Deborah. The royal family donated candleholders to the museum.

== Fundraising and subsequent closure ==
The farmstead remained a popular attraction in the area for about 10 years, but following a downturn in the local economy, funding and attendance declined and the attraction was closed.

By 2011, the New Sweden Colonial Homestead Foundation was fundraising to restore and re-open the museum. The elements had taken their toll on the buildings; at the time, it was estimated that $10,000 per structure was needed for roof repairs.

In September 2011, a fundraising reception was attended by the Swedish Ambassador to the United States, Jonas Hafström to draw attention to the foundation's efforts. Various fundraising activities at the farmstead were done in collaboration with summer youth programs. The homestead received grants from Cumberland County and Swedish Council of America, among others. In 2012 the foundation received $10,000 donation from owners of Bridgeton-based Whibco. The Swedish Colonial Society was also enlisted to help with restoration efforts. Eventually plans were made to permanently close and move the museum.

== Relocation of farmstead buildings ==
In 2015, a move to Wilmington, Delaware (site of New Sweden's Fort Christina) was considered. Later, a decision was made to move the buildings to Governor Printz Park in the community of Essington, Tinicum Township, Pennsylvania, the site of New Sweden's The Printzhof. On June 1, 2019, the newly reconstructed residence building was dedicated in the park. In 2020, the remaining six buildings were reconstructed while the park was closed due to the COVID-19 pandemic. The first open house for the completed farmstead was held on June 12, 2021, and the dedication ceremony held the following year, on June 12, 2022.

== See also ==
- Hewing
- Log home
- Forest Finns
- Eskilstuna, Swedish sister city of Bridgeton
- Morton Homestead
