= Reorus Torkillus =

Swedish Priest (1608–1643)

- Born: 1608; Mölndal, Sweden
- Died: 1643 (aged 34–35); New Sweden
- Church: Church of Sweden
- Title: Ordained priest, missionary to New Sweden

Reorus Torkillus (1608–1643) was a Swedish priest of the Church of Sweden who was the first Lutheran clergyman to settle in what would become the United States.

== Biography ==
Torkillus was born at Mölndal, near Gothenburg, Sweden in 1608. He studied for the ministry at Lidköping and Skara in Sweden. After completing his education, he served as a chaplain and lecturer at the high school in Gothenburg.

Torkillus sailed with the second expedition of Swedish settlers to New Sweden, aboard the Kalmar Nyckel. He arrived at Fort Christina near present-day Wilmington, Delaware on April 17, 1640. Initially, Torkillus officiated at church services held in a blockhouse at Fort Christina. Planning for and construction of the first log churches in the New Sweden settlement was probably begun during his tenure. Torkillus died at Fort Christina in 1643 and was succeeded in his pastorship to the New Sweden colonists by John Campanius.

Today Holy Trinity Church, also known as Old Swedes', is a National Historic Landmark. It was built from local blue granite and Swedish bricks that had been used as ship's ballast on the site of Fort Christina's burial ground. The church is stated to be the nation's oldest church building still standing as originally built. Lutheran services were held in the Swedish language well into the 18th century.

== Other sources ==
- Gilbert, W. Kent (1988). "Immigration and Americanizaton". Commitment to Unity: A History of the Lutheran Church in America. Philadelphia: Fortress Press. ISBN 0-8006-0891-7.
- Gross, Ernie (1990). This Day in Religion. New York: Neil-Schuman Publishers. ISBN 1-55570-045-4.
- Henderson, John R. (2007-09-05). "A History of the Kalmar Nyckel and a New Look at New Sweden". Ithaca College website. Ithaca, NY: Ithaca College.
- Wentz, Abdel Ross (1955). "New Sweden". A Basic History of Lutheranism in America. Philadelphia: Muhlenberg Press.
