= John Campanius =

Swedish priest

- Born: August 15, 1601; Stockholm, Sweden
- Died: September 17, 1683 (aged 82); Sweden
- Education: Uppsala University
- Church: Church of Sweden
- Title: Ordained pastor, missionary to North America

John Campanius (Swedish: Johannes Jonæ Holmiensis Campanius; August 15, 1601 – September 17, 1683), also known as Johan Campanius and Johannes Campanius, was a Swedish Lutheran priest assigned to the New Sweden colony.

== Background ==
John Campanius was born in Stockholm and attended Uppsala University, where he studied theology and graduated in 1633. He was ordained into the Lutheran ministry during 1633. He served as the chaplain to the Swedish delegation in Russia in 1634. He then moved to Norrtälje, where he served as a schoolmaster beginning in 1636. He also served as chaplain and preceptor of the Stockholm Orphan's Home, a position he continued in through 1642.

== New Sweden ==
Campanius left Stockholm on August 16, 1642, and arrived at New Sweden on February 15, 1643. He came to accompany the first Swedish settlers to Fort Christina, near present-day Wilmington, Delaware, and served as a missionary to the nearby Lenape Indians. Campanius served as a replacement for the first Swedish Lutheran Minister, Reorus Torkillus who had recently died. For several years the New Sweden colony had no specific location for organized worship. Campanius had to visit the settlers at their cabins, which ranged all the way up to Fort Nya Gothenburg on Tinicum Island. John Campanius dedicated the new church at Tinicum on September 4, 1646. One of the few items which remain from his time of service is a gilded silver chalice used in celebrating the Eucharist.

Campanius also began to make notable headway in evangelizing the Lenape. He gained a good grasp of their language, and learned how to preach to them with good effect. He also transliterated their words, numbers, and common phrases for the use of later missionaries. For example, he accommodated the Lord's Prayer to the American circumstances by substituting for "daily bread" "a plentiful supply of venison and corn." After gaining experience in this way, he eventually was able to translate Luther's Small Catechism into the Lenape language. This effort, which was not printed until 1696 (Stockholm), is one of the first attempts by a European native to create a written document in one of the indigenous American languages. It was published in the Delaware and Swedish languages, together with a vocabulary.

Campanius also studied the traditions of the natives, and recorded them in his journal. While this did help to preserve some anthropological information on them, it also helped perpetrate the idea that the Native Americans were descendants of the lost tribes of Israel.

By 1647, he wrote to his Archbishop in Stockholm that he had gotten weary of his work in New Sweden, and requested that he be allowed to return home. In 1648, three other ministers were sent to New Sweden to continue his work and Campanius was allowed to return to Sweden. There he served as minister of churches at Härnevi and Frösthult in Uppsala County in east central Sweden until his death in 1683. In these positions, he also worked on completing his translation of Luther's catechism. Both John Campanius and his wife Margareta were buried at the Frösthult Church in Enköping Municipality.

== John Campanius Holm Award ==
John Campanius was the first person known to have taken systematic weather observations in the American Colonies. He is considered by some to be the first weatherman in America because he kept a daily record of the weather at New Sweden. The records included at least 1644 and 1645 and were published in Sweden in 1702. The prestigious John Campanius Holm Award is granted annually to honor cooperative observers for outstanding accomplishments in the field of meteorological observations. No more than twenty-five awards are given annually. The certificate is signed by the Administrator of the National Oceanic and Atmospheric Administration (NOAA).

== Works ==
- Lutheri Catechismus öfwersatt på american-virginiske språket

== See also ==
- Laurentius Carels, Swedish American Lutheran pastor

== Sources ==
- Clay, Jehu Curtis Annals of the Swedes on the Delaware (Philadelphia, Pennsylvania: J. C. Pechin. 1835)
- Myers, Albert Cook, ed. Narratives of Early Pennsylvania, West New Jersey, and Delaware, 1630-1707 (New York: Charles Scribner's Sons. 1912)
- Jordan, John W. A History of Delaware County, Pennsylvania (History of Timicun Township. New York: Lewis Historical Publishing Company. 1914)
- Ward, Christopher Dutch and Swedes on the Delaware, 1609- 1664 (University of Pennsylvania Press. 1930)
