= Fort Nya Elfsborg =

17th century Swedish fort in Delaware

Coordinates: 39°32′54″N 75°31′32″W

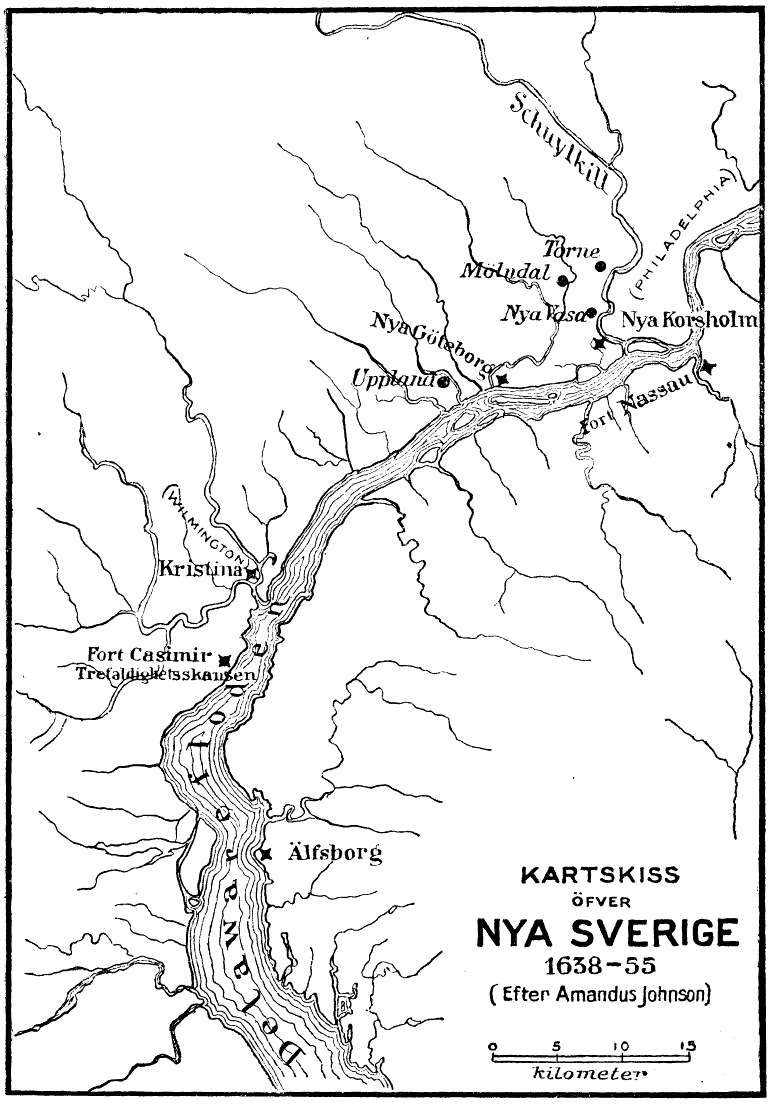
New Sweden ca. 1650.

Fort Nya Elfsborg was a fortification and settlement established as a part of New Sweden. Built in 1643 and named after the Älvsborg Fortress off Gothenburg, Fort Nya Elfsborg was located on the New Jersey side of the Delaware River, between present day Salem and Alloway Creek.

== History ==
At the time of European colonization in the 17th century, the Delaware was known as the South River and the Salem River was known as Varkens Kill, or Hogg Creek. The Dutch established a factorij at Fort Nassau on the east bank of the South River in 1626, and claimed the territory as part of New Netherland. Despite the claim, the colony of New Sweden was founded, in 1638, at Fort Christina on the west bank. In 1641, without having a patent, a group of 60 settlers (20 families) from the New Haven Colony (in today's Connecticut) purchased land along the kill and the Schuylkill from indigenous Lenape. In 1643, the Dutch forcibly disbanded their trading post on the Schuylkill opposite their fort.

Fort Nya Elfsborg was built shortly after Johan Printz, governor of New Sweden, arrived in the colony on 15 February 1643, allowing the Varkens Kill settlement to remain if they swore allegiance to Sweden. He also built Fort Nya Gothenborg on Tinicum Island (to the immediate SW of today's Philadelphia), where he built his own manor house which he called The Printzhof.

Fort Nya Elfsborg had iron and brass 12pd cannons mounted on earth and wooden palisades. It was a Swedish-style three-cornered earthen redoubt with eight guns. Log farmsteads similar to those found in Sweden went up around the fort further downriver, so that Dutch West India Company ships coming up from the bay would have to pass them first.

At that time, this area of the river was mostly swamp and the soldiers garrisoned there were inundated by mosquitos. Fort Mosquito (Fort Myggenborgh), as it was commonly nicknamed, was eventually abandoned, the soldiers succumbing not to enemy cannon fire, but bites. New Sweden burned down the fort after the Dutch built Fort Casimir across the river in 1651.

The actual site of the fort is now under water at Elsinboro Point. In August 2012, archeological surveys were undertaken to locate the precise location and any remains of the fort, without success. There is a black stone monument outside the Elsinboro Township School. The stone block came from an old fortress in Sweden built in the 13th century.

== See also ==
- Swedish colonization of the Americas
- Fort Christina

== Sources ==
- Johnson, Amandus. Instruction for Johan Printz, Governor of New Sweden, The First Constitution or Supreme Law of the States of Pennsylvania and Delaware. (translated from the Swedish with Introduction, Notes and Appendices, Including Letters from Governor John Wint. Philadelphia: The Swedish Colonial Society, 1930)
- Weslager, C. A. New Sweden on the Delaware: 1638-1655 (Wilmington, DE: The Middle Atlantic Press, 1988).
