= Laurentius Carels =

Swedish Lutheran clergyman and American settler

Laurentius Carels (1624–1688) was one of the first settlers of Delaware County, Pennsylvania and one of the first Swedish Lutheran clergyman in New Sweden. As was typical among Swedish ministers, he generally used a Latinized version of his name Laurentius Caroli Lockenius. He is listed in historical records under several different names, most commonly as Lars Carlsson Lock.

== Biography ==
Lars Carlsson was born in Sweden during 1624. In September 1647, at the age of 23, Lars Carlsson sailed from Gothenburg to New Sweden. He subsequently adopted the surname Lock from his place of origin, Lockerud, near Mariestad, in Skaraborg County, Sweden. In the colony, he replaced the veteran minister, John Campanius. He was based at a church built by Johan Björnsson Printz, governor of New Sweden on Tinicum Island. At the start of his ministry, he served about 200 members. The Swedish colony of New Sweden ended during the summer of 1655. The Swedish settlement was incorporated into Dutch New Netherland on September 15, 1655. the Swedish settlers were allowed to retain a pastor of their confession. Reverend Lars Lock remained, but the other pastors returned to Sweden. His congregation was widely scattered, extending from the Schuylkill River on the north to Christina River on the south.

His role as the only minister on the Delaware River did not end until 1677 when the Swedish settlers living northeast of Darby Creek built a new log church at Wicaco (now Gloria Dei (Old Swedes') Church) and invited Jacob Fabritius to be their pastor. Jacob Fabritius, a native of Grosglogau in Silesia, had arrived in New York in 1669 to serve the Dutch Lutheran churches along the Hudson River. Lars Carlsson Lock continued to serve in the pulpits of both the Tinicum church and the Crane Hook church until his death at Upland Creek in September 1688 at the reported age of 64.

== Legal matters ==
In 1674 Lars Lock bought the former Tequirassy estate of Olof Persson Stille in what is now Eddystone, Pennsylvania. Lars Lock was involved in several legal disputes and was rumored to have had an "overfondness for intoxicating drinks." Lars Carlsson Lock also got into trouble for selling liquor to Native Americans and was involved in at least one lawsuit over a horse.

On September 20, 1661, another early settler, Jacob Jough, ran away with his first wife, Catharina, which led to Lars Carlsson Lock (in his words) to fall "from one misfortune to another." In response, Lars Carlsson Lock, after finding out where a trunk of Jough's was being kept, trespassed into a house and broke the trunk open and took some of his wife's property (and left a "memorandum of what he had done"). Within a month of his wife's desertion, Lars Carlsson Lock sought to remarry, but first tried in vain to obtain a divorce. He decided to marry Beata Lom, the 18-year-old daughter of Måns Lom. For his unauthorized marriage and for breaking into another's home, charges were brought against Lars Lock and he was fined 280 guilders. Together Lars Carlsson Lock and Beata were the parents of seven known children.

== Other sources ==
- Barton, H. Arnold (1994) A Folk Divided: Homeland Swedes and Swedish Americans, 1840—1940 (Uppsala: Acta Universitatis Upsaliensis).
- Benson, Adolph B. and Naboth Hedin, eds. (1938) Swedes in America, 1638-1938 (The Swedish American Tercentenary Association. New Haven, CT: Yale University Press) ISBN 978-0-8383-0326-9
- Johnson, Amandus (1927) The Swedes on the Delaware (International Printing Company, Philadelphia)
- Munroe, John A. (1977) Colonial Delaware (Delaware Heritage Press, Wilmington)
- Ward, Christopher (1930) Dutch and Swedes on the Delaware, 1609-1664 (University of Pennsylvania Press)
- Weslager, C. A. (1988) New Sweden on the Delaware 1638-1655 (The Middle Atlantic Press, Wilmington ) ISBN 0-912608-65-X
