= The Printzhof =

- U.S. National Register of Historic Places
- U.S. National Historic Landmark
- Pennsylvania state historical marker
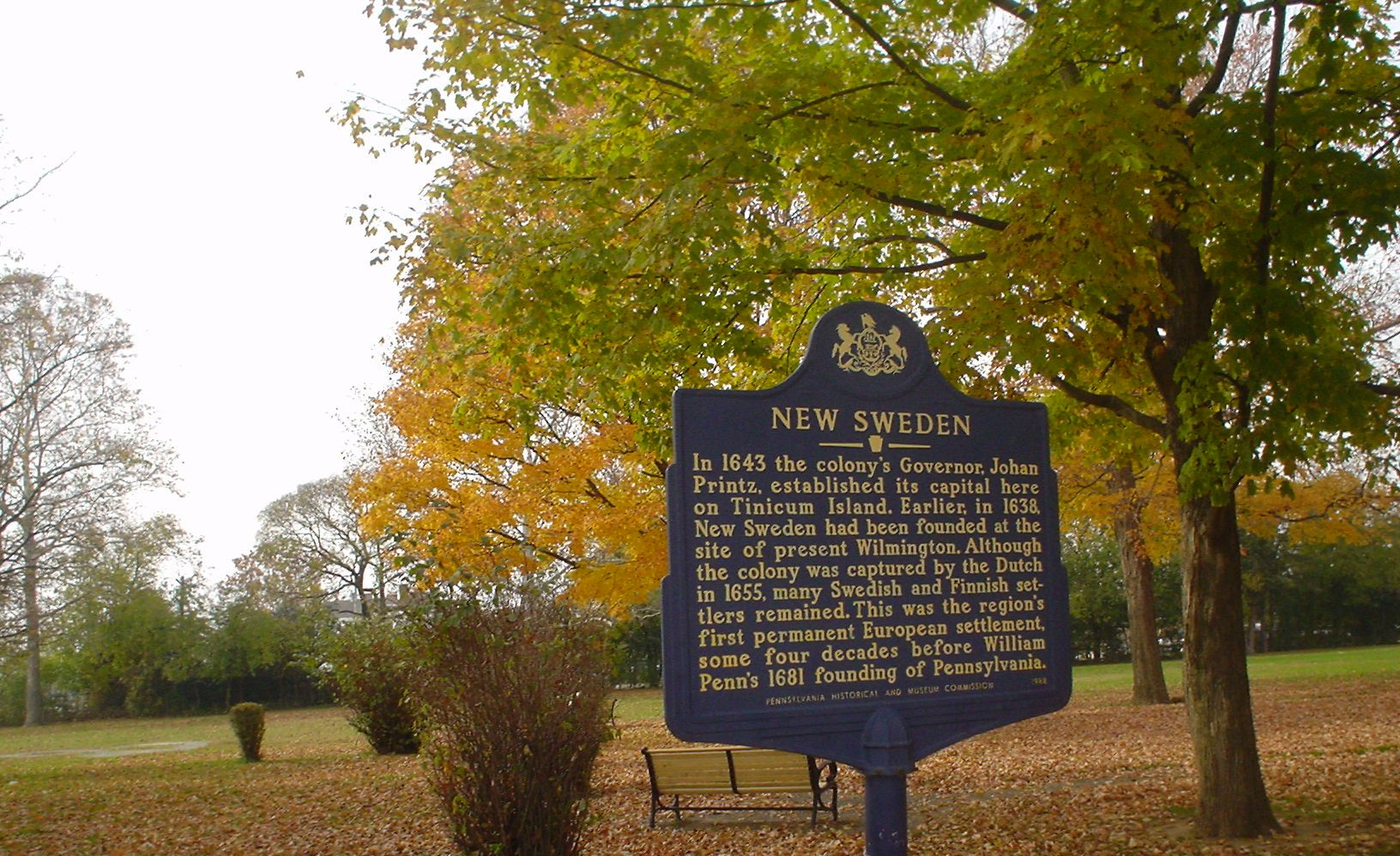
- View of the site

- Location within Pennsylvania Location within the United States
- Location: Taylor Ave. and 2nd St., Essington, Pennsylvania
- Coordinates: 39°51′39.8″N 75°18′11.35″W
- Built: 1643
- NRHP reference No.: 66000661

Significant dates
- Added to NRHP: October 15, 1966
- Designated NHL: November 5, 1961
- Designated PHMC: Monday, June 28, 1948

The Printzhof, located in Governor Printz Park in Essington, Pennsylvania, was the home of Johan Björnsson Printz, governor of New Sweden.

== History ==
In 1643, Johan Printz moved his capital from Fort Christina (located in what is now Wilmington, Delaware) to Tinicum Island. At that time Fort Gothenburg was established in addition to Printz's dwelling and headquarters. Two years later a fire swept over the newly established settlement. The Printzhof was reconstructed more solidly and lavishly. The two-story log structure contained lumber sent from Sweden, glass windows and lavish draperies.

Johan Björnsson Printz, his wife and younger children returned to Sweden during 1653. The Dutch West India Company subsequently captured the Swedish colony in 1655. Armegott Printz, the eldest daughter of Governor Printz, had married his successor, Lt. Johan Papegoja. She remained at The Printzhof even after the Dutch conquest. During 1662, she sold the estate for a partial down payment with the remainder due when she reached The Netherlands. When payment was refused, she returned to reclaim possession of her property. Ten years later in 1672, the Governor and Council ruled Armegott Printz should be in possession of the property. She subsequently sold the estate a second time and returned to Sweden where she died on November 25, 1695, at Läckö Castle.

Today, the Printzhof's stone foundations are the only remains of the settlement. The Printzhof site is located near the intersection of Taylor Avenue and Second Street in Essington, Pennsylvania. The site was declared a National Historic Landmark in 1961.

The farmstead from the former New Sweden Farmstead Museum in Bridgeton, New Jersey, was moved to the site of The Printzhof in Governor Printz Park and reconstructed from 2019 to 2020, and officially dedicated on June 12, 2022.

== See also ==
- List of European archaeological sites on the National Register of Historic Places in Pennsylvania
