= Johan Björnsson Printz =

1600s governor of New Sweden

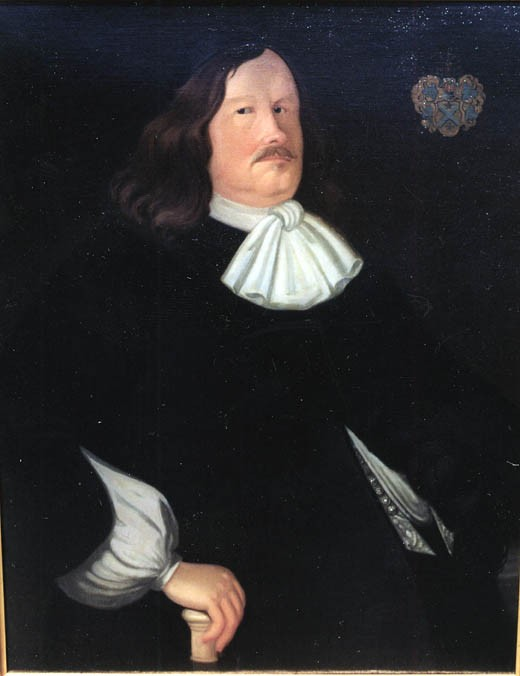
Johan Printz, Governor of New Sweden

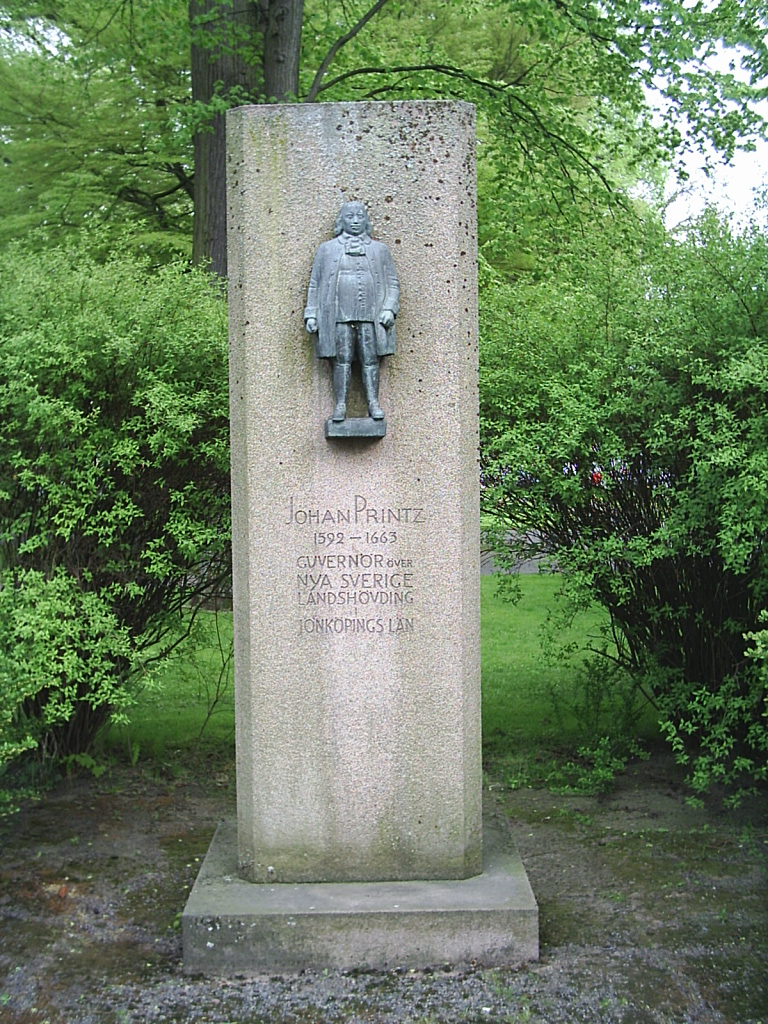
Sculpture in the park, "Rådhusparken" in Jönköping, Sweden

Johan Björnsson Printz (July 20, 1592 – May 3, 1663) was a Swedish military officer and colonial official. He served as the 3rd governor of New Sweden, the Swedish colony in North America, from 1643 until 1653.

== Early life in Sweden ==
He was born in Bottnaryd, Jönköping County, in the province of Småland in 1592. He was the son of a Lutheran pastor, Björn Hansson, and Gunilla Svensdotter. Printz received his early education in Sweden followed in 1618 by theological studies at German universities. While on a journey in about 1620, he was pressed into military service. The involuntary change in occupation turned out to suit him.

During the Thirty Years' War, he initially became a mercenary for Archduke Leopold of Austria, Duke Christian of Brunswick, and King Christian IV of Denmark. Printz entered the Swedish army in 1625 rising to the rank of lieutenant colonel under King Gustavus Adolphus of Sweden. He was dismissed from service for surrendering the Saxon town of Chemnitz.

== Life in New Sweden ==
By 1642, he was restored to royal favor, ennobled and appointed to be the third governor of New Sweden. He arrived at Fort Christina in the colony on 15 February 1643 with two ships, Fama (Fawn) and Svanen (The Swan). Under his rule the Swedish colony initially prospered. He built Fort Nya Elfsborg on the east bank of the Delaware, and Fort New Gothenburg on Tinicum Island (to the immediate SW of today's Philadelphia). He thus secured a monopoly of trade with the Indians that inhabited both sides of the bay and river as far north as Trenton.

On Tinicum Island, he also built his own manor house which he called The Printzhof. It was two stories high, made of hewn logs and fireplaces of brick imported from Sweden. The manor contained a finished lumber interior made from lumber sent from Sweden, glass windows and lavish draperies. The location was chosen with an eye to controlling the trade of the river and because it was close to the Dutch at Fort Masson.

He built Printz’s Mill on Cobbs Creek in 1645.

Printz, who was an energetic and conscientious governor, established harmony with the local Indians. He was a very large man, reputably over 400 pounds, which earned him the nickname "Big Belly" from the Lenni Lenape native tribe. During his tenure of office, seven expeditions, containing more than 300 emigrants, sailed from Sweden. The influx of settlers was made up of farmers who dealt fairly with the Indians and established a precedent of kindliness and justice. William Penn and his followers later became indirect beneficiaries of this treatment when they were received in a friendly manner by the Indians.

Printz arranged amicable relations with English settlers, initiated trade connections with the Dutch in New Netherlands, and directed several commercial enterprises within New Sweden.

In time, problems with the surrounding Dutch and English colonies became increasingly severe. Short of supplies from Sweden, Printz was unable to prevent the Dutch and the English from practically monopolizing the beaver fur trade in the area. His main adversary was Peter Stuyvesant, Director General of New Netherlands, and earlier on, his local representative Andries Hudde.

Printz also was an autocratic administrator and his growing quarrels with the settlers led several of them to petition to take their grievances directly to the Swedish government. Printz had the ringleader of the dissident colonists, Anders Jönsson, hanged on August 1, 1653, but tensions continued to grow. Grievances included lack of land rights and trade rights. In 1653 Hans Månsson and 21 others including Olof Persson Stille, Peter Minuit and Sven Gunnarsson signed a petition opposing his rule.

Eventually, Printz found his position impossible, and in 1654 he returned to Sweden. His son-in-law Johan Papegoja, married to his daughter Armegott Printz, was acting governor until John Rising (Johan Risingh) was appointed Governor in his place.

Pritz was a slave owner who enslaved Anthony Swart, the first documented Black resident of New Sweden.

== Later life in Sweden ==
On his return to Sweden, Printz was made a general. Several years later, in 1658, he was appointed governor of Jönköping. The information on this period in his life is limited.

== Family ==
He was survived by five daughters, among them the well known Armegot Printz, and his second wife, Maria von Linnestau, who he had married in 1642. He was predeceased by his son, and also by his first wife, Elizabeth von Boche, whom he had married in 1622.

== Memorials ==
- Governor Printz Park is located just south of I-95 at the Route 420 in Essington, PA.
- The New Sweden Marker at 2nd Street & Taylor Avenue in Essington, Pennsylvania acknowledges the role of Johan Printz.
- The Printzhof in Essington, Pennsylvania is listed on National Historic Landmark Register Number: 66000661.
- A portion of U.S. Route 13 north of Wilmington, Delaware is named Governor Printz Boulevard.
- A portion of Pennsylvania Route 291 in Tinicum Township is named Governor Printz Boulevard.
- The site of Printz's Mill on Cobbs Creek in Darby, PA is indicated by a Pennsylvania Historical and Museum Commission Marker.
- The Johan Printz Sculpture is in the park Rådhusparken in Jönköping, Sweden.
- The Johan Printz Plaque is in the church yard of Bottnaryd kyrka in Jönköping, Sweden
- The Liberty ship SS Johan Printz.

== Other Reading ==
- Johnson, Amandus. Instruction for Johan Printz, Governor of New Sweden, "The First Constitution or Supreme Law of the States of Pennsylvania and Delaware". (translated from the Swedish. Philadelphia: The Swedish Colonial Society, 1930)
- Weslager, C. A. New Sweden on the Delaware: 1638-1655 (Wilmington, DE: The Middle Atlantic Press, 1988).

Political offices
Preceded by Peter Hollander Ridder	Governor of New Sweden; February 1643–October 1653	Succeeded by Johan Papegoja
