= Revolt of the Long Swede =

1669 uprising in colonial New York

- Part of the European colonization of the Americas
Date	1669
Location	Middle Colonies
Result	English victory

Belligerents
Middle Colonies	Swedish settlers

Commanders and leaders
Francis Lovelace	Marcus Jacobson; Henry Coleman; Rev. Lawrence Lock; Armgard Papagoya

The Revolt of the Long Swede also known as the Intended Insurrection of the Long Swede, the Insurrection in Delaware, the Uproar Among the Swedes, and the Long Finn Rebellion, was an unsuccessful rebellion against English colonial rule in the Middle Colonies by Swedish settlers in 1669.

== Background ==
By the middle of the 17th century, the Realm of Sweden had reached its greatest territorial extent and was one of the great powers of Europe. Sweden then included Finland and Estonia, along with parts of modern Russia, Poland, Germany, Norway and Latvia under King Gustavus Adolphus.

Other northern European nations were establishing colonies in the New World and building successful trading empires at this time. The Swedes sought to expand their influence by creating their own plantation (tobacco) and fur-trading colony to circumvent other European merchants. Thus in 1638 the colony of New Sweden was established along the Delaware River. The colony would expand to later include nearly two dozen towns and seven forts before the Dutch conquered New Sweden in 1655. Just a few years later the English conquered New Netherland in 1664. Swedish settlers found themselves under English rule, a fact many Swedes resented as the new English authorities enacted far stricter land and deed rights which reshuffled ownership of much of the Swedes property.

== The revolt ==
Marcus Jacobson, (alias John Brinckson) was either a Finn or Swede of notably large size, who while living in England, was convicted of a petty crime and sentenced to penal transportation to the Province of Maryland.

After arriving in Maryland, Jacobson escaped from indentured servitude and fled to the Swedish colonial settlement of Upland, Pennsylvania. Once having arrived in town he claimed to be the son of Hans Christoff von Königsmarck (a noted general in Sweden) and falsely claimed that a Swedish Navy fleet was lying in wait in the Delaware Bay under instructions to, at the proper time, wrest the region from the English. He claimed he had been sent to recruit Swedish settlers to take up arms against the English and spur a revolt to reclaim the former Swedish colony.

Jacobson soon found a number of supporters to his cause, including a wealthy Finnish settler named Henry Coleman as well as a former Chaplain named Lawrence Lock and Armgard Papagoya, the daughter of former Governor Johan Björnsson Printz. The group managed to secure firearms and gunpowder before the English learned of the plot. Governor Francis Lovelace, of the Province of New York, issued an order for the arrest of Jacobson and his fellow conspirators on August 2, 1669.

During a dinner on September 4, Justice Peter Cock was present when a group of Swedes were persuaded by Jacobson to swear an oath of allegiance to the King of Sweden. Cock protested this and attempted to arrest Jacobson, resulting in a struggle where Cock injured Jacobson with a knife before he escaped. Soon thereafter a posse was formed to track down and arrest Jacobson.

A riverboat captain named Carr managed to capture Jacobson, who was imprisoned in New Castle, Delaware. Jacobson promptly attempted to escape his imprisonment along with a fellow Native American prisoner who had been condemned to death. The native managed to escape but Jacobson did not and was held until trial. Henry Coleman, learning of an arrest warrant issued against him fled to live among the Indians and was never heard of again. Rev. Lock and Mrs. Pappehoya paid bail and were released until trial.

The case was held at New Castle, December 6, 1669, and heard by a commission appointed by the governor and a jury. Jacobson was found guilty and sentenced to be, "publicly and severely whipped and branded in the face with the letter "R" for Rebellion, after which he be secured until he can be sent and sold to the Barbadoes or some other remote plantation".

== Aftermath ==
On January 25, 1670, Jacobson was put aboard the merchant ship Fort Albany and transported to be sold into indentured servitude in Barbados, after that date nothing more was known about him.

The accomplices were sentenced to forfeit one half of their goods and chattels, while a small fine was placed upon those of lesser note. At least 80 Swedish settlers in total were fined.

In 1823, American author and future Secretary of the Navy James Kirke Paulding would write a highly romanticized novel based loosely on the events of the revolt titled, Koningsmarke, The Long Finne: A Story of the New World.

== See also ==
List of rebellions in the United States
