= Johan Risingh =

Swedish colonial governor

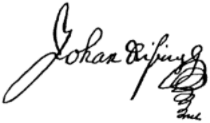
Signature of Johan Classon Risingh

Johan Classon Risingh (1617–1672) was a Swedish politician who was the last governor of New Sweden, the Swedish colony in North America.

== Biography ==
Risingh was born in 1617 in Risinge, Östergötland, Sweden. His father was a pastor named Reverend Clas Botvidi. After gymnasium at Linköping, he attended the University of Uppsala and University of Leyden. From 1651 to 1653, he held the office of secretary of the Commercial College of Sweden under Erik Alexsson Oxenstierna. He wrote the first treatise on trade and economics ever compiled in Sweden in the autumn of 1653. Receiving knighthood, he set out from Sweden early in 1654, to take up his duties in New Sweden. Risingh was appointed assistant councilor of New Sweden under Governor Johan Printz.

Upon arrival in 1654, Risingh expressed concerns about the loss of Native alliances due to declining trade. This relationship was in decline due to rising hostilities over trade competition in the Mid-Atlantic region of the United States. Risingh wrote that the loss of Native alliances could severely impact the territorial integrity of New Sweden against the English colony of Maryland and Dutch colony of New Netherland.

His first act was to cause the seizure of the Dutch Fort Casimir, which the Director-General of New Netherland, Peter Stuyvesant, had erected just below Fort Christina (near New Castle, Delaware) in 1651. Risingh claimed that Fort Casimir had been built on land that New Sweden had purchased from the local Native Americans.

Stuyvesant subsequently responded by leading an expedition to New Sweden and brought the colony under control of his government. In 1655, Risingh wrote to the Swedish government asking for financial support, but none was given. Swedish-allied Lenape launched raids on underdefended villages in New Netherland in response to the Dutch attack on New Sweden. Despite this, New Sweden prompted to surrender following the fall of Fort Christina to the Dutch on August 15, 1655. After the surrender, Risingh and the other officials, soldiers, and such colonists as were unwilling to become Dutch subjects, were taken back to Europe. Risingh died in poverty at Stockholm in April 1672.

Risingh's reports for the period 1654 to 1655, constituting a valuable history of New Sweden under his administration. A contemporary manuscript copy of this report in Swedish is in the National Library of Sweden. This report was printed in 1878, in the appendix of Carl K. S. Sprinchorn's Kolonien Nya Sveriges Historia (in English: History of the Colony of New Sweden). A translation of Sprinchorn's text was made by Amandus Johnson.

== In culture ==
Risingh is a character in Washington Irving's "Knickerbocker's History of New York." Irving gives a tongue-in-cheek report of the battle for Fort Casimir.

== Other sources ==
- Johnson, Amandus. Johan Classon Rising: The Last Governor of New Sweden (Philadelphia: The Swedish Colonial Society, 1915)
- Johnson, Amandus. The Swedish Settlements on the Delaware 1638-1664, Volume II (Philadelphia: The Swedish Colonial Society, 1927)
- Ward, Christopher. Dutch and Swedes on the Delaware, 1609 - 1664 (University of Pennsylvania Press, 1930)
- Griffis, William Elliot. The Story of New Netherland. The Dutch In America (Boston And New York. Houghton Mifflin Company. The Riverside Press Cambridge. 1909)
- Myers, Albert Cook. Narratives of early Pennsylvania, West New Jersey and Delaware, 1630-1707. Charles Scribner's, 1912. Retrieved from https://archive.org/details/narrativesofearl00myer/page/n3/mode/2up

Political offices
Preceded by Johan Papegoja	Governor of New Sweden; May 1654 - September 15, 1655	Captured by New Netherland
