= American Swedish Historical Museum =

Museum in Philadelphia, Pennsylvania, US

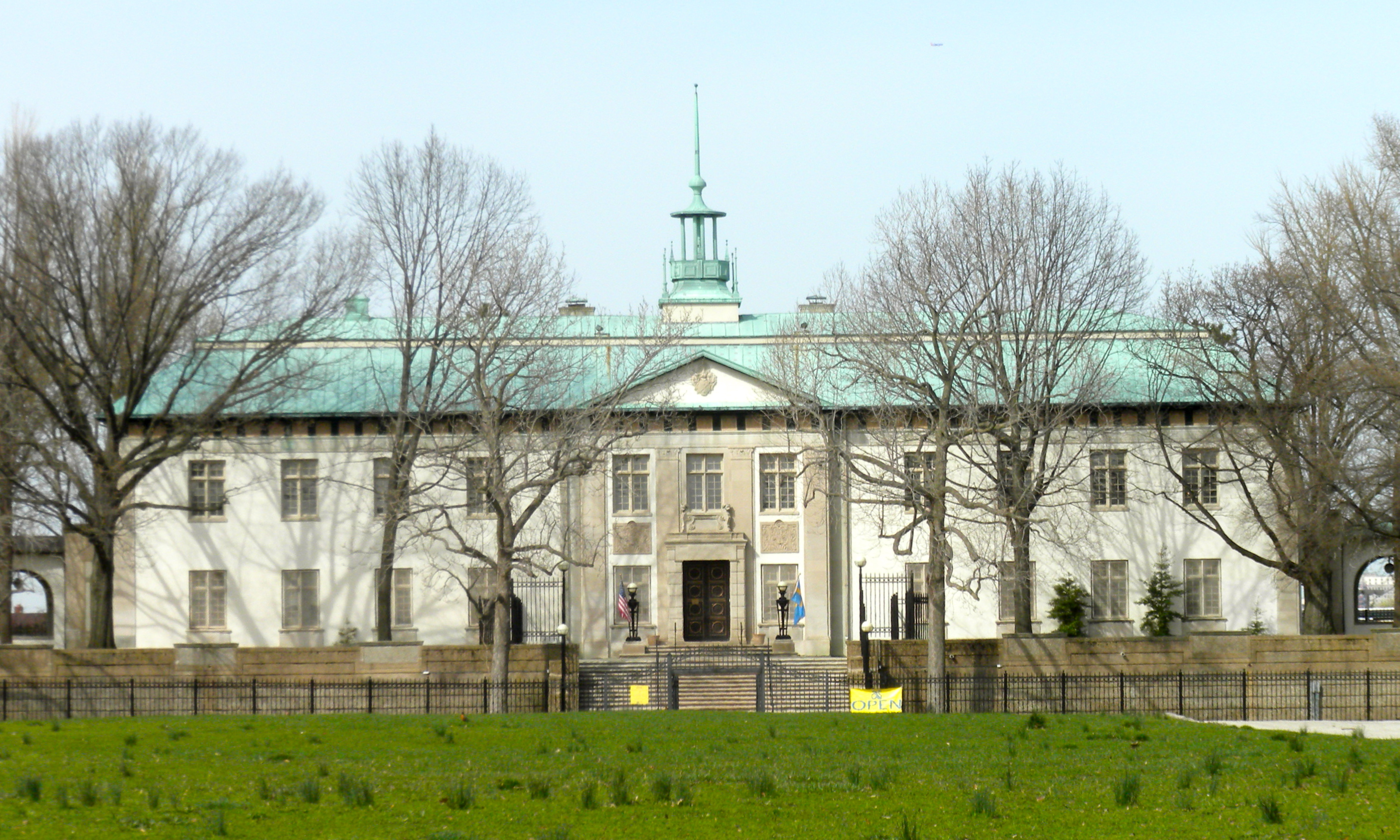
- Established: 1926
- Location: Franklin Delano Roosevelt Park, Philadelphia, Pennsylvania, U.S.
- Coordinates: 39.906°N 75.181°W
- Website: www.americanswedish.org

The American Swedish Historical Museum is the oldest Swedish-American museum in the United States. It is located in Franklin Delano Roosevelt Park in South Philadelphia, on part of a historic 17th-century land grant originally provided by Queen Christina of Sweden to settlers of New Sweden.

It has EIN 23-1417519 as a 501(c)(3) Public Charity; in 2025 it claimed $1,244,598 in total revenue and total assets of $3,737,227.

== History ==
During 1926, the Swedish-American committee of the Sesqui-Centennial International Exposition of 1926 was formed. Noted author and historian, Amandus Johnson was elected to be its president. From this activity grew a committee to plan ways to preserve the memory of the New Sweden colony which dated to 1638. The New Sweden Tricentennial Association was formed which commissioned and published Swedes In America, 1638–1938, a work of historical research which was edited by Adolph B. Benson and Naboth Hedin.

The first national campaign was underway to erect a Swedish Museum in Philadelphia began soon after. On June 2, 1926, Sweden's Crown Prince and future King Gustaf VI Adolf placed the museum's cornerstone. In the fall of 1928, Christian von Schneidau painted the museum's entrance-hall ceiling and wall murals. The formal public dedication of the museum took place on June 28, 1938. This event was set to coordinate with the 300th anniversary of the Swedish arrival on the Delaware shores. Swedish Prince Bertil and Princess Louise made up the royal party that dedicated the museum.

== Building design ==
The building's design is based on Ericsberg Castle, a 17th-century manor house in Södermanland, Sweden. The architect, John Nydén, a Swedish-American from Chicago, combined Swedish and American elements by modeling the exterior arcades on those of Mount Vernon. The copper cupola is a copy of the one atop Stockholm City Hall. The museum has 12 permanent galleries displaying a broad and interesting collection combining history and culture. Three of the museum's 12 galleries are devoted to the history of the New Sweden Colony established in the Delaware Valley in 1638. The museum provides a wealth of information about this often unfamiliar period in history. Other galleries, ranging in style from Art Deco to International, concentrate on more recent Swedish contributions.

== Permanent galleries ==
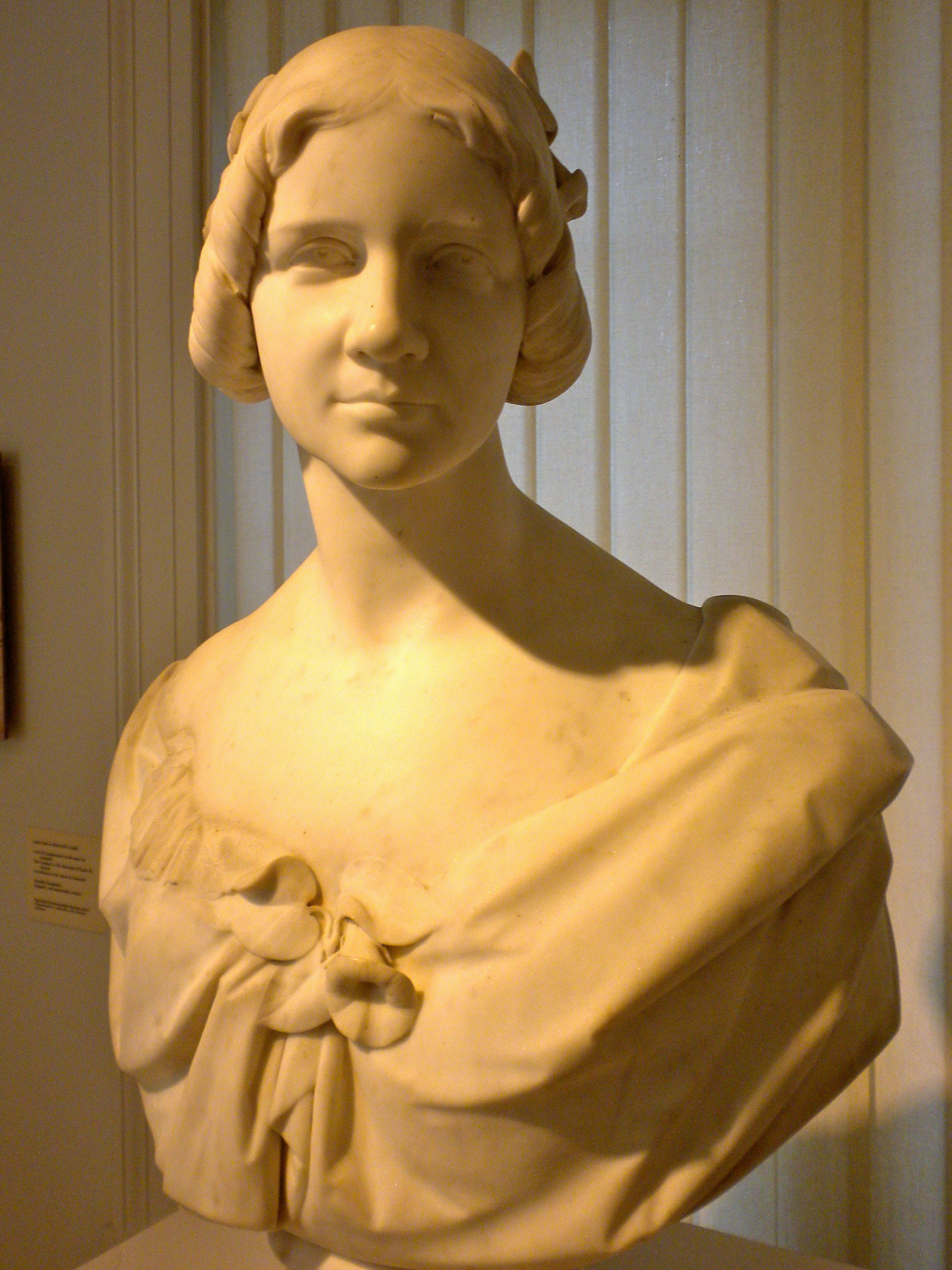
Bust of Jenny Lind, 1850, which she kept in the drawing room of her home in Malvern, England and which was later donated to the museum by her son Col. Ernest Goldschmidt.

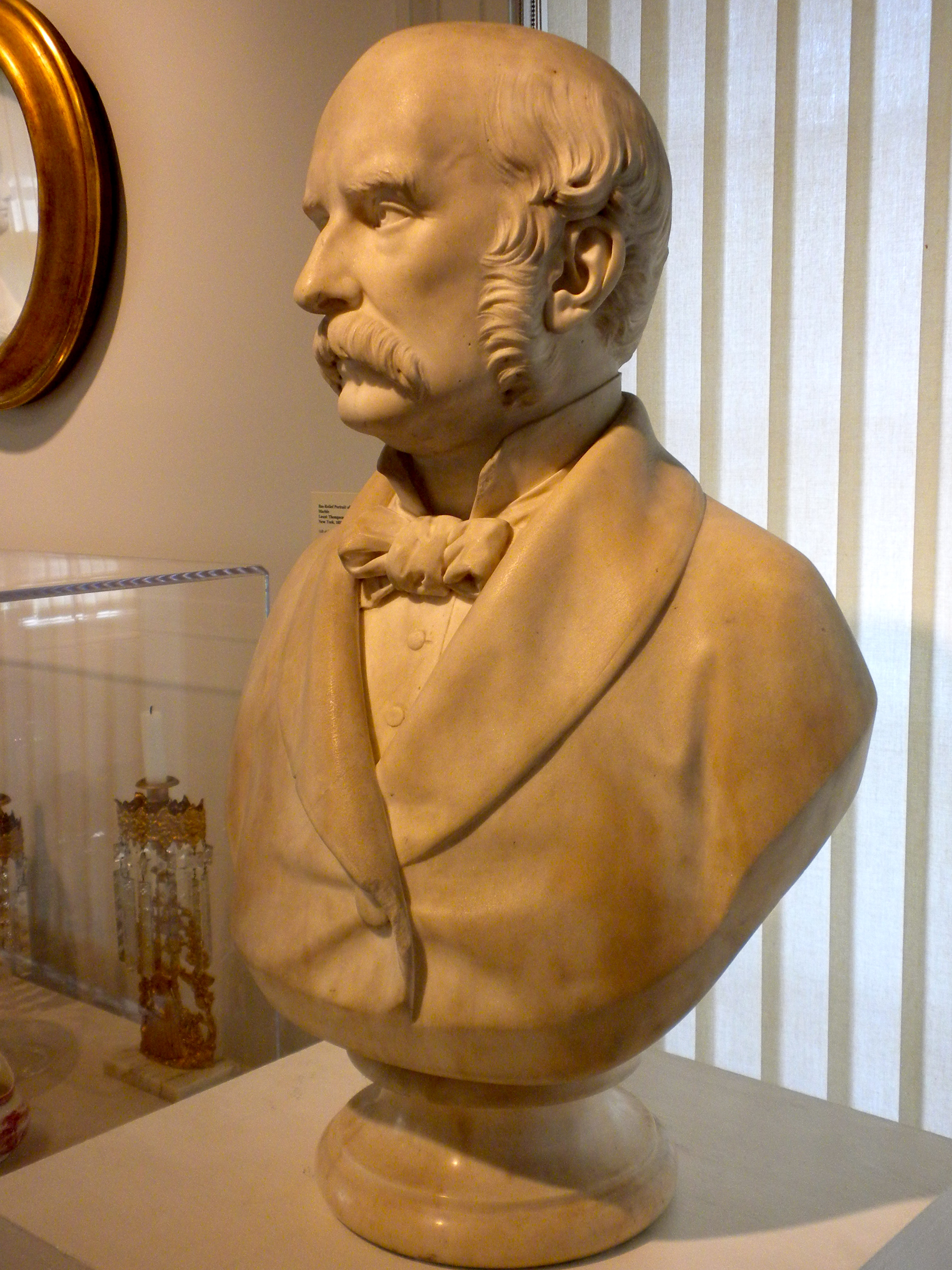
Bust of Lind's husband Otto Goldschmidt

- Golden Map Room – First of three galleries devoted to New Sweden. Exhibits elaborate on the theme of Sweden in the 17th century.
- New Sweden Room – Gallery telling the story of life on the land on which the museum stands.
- The Stuga – Stuga means little house. This is a rendering of a 19th-century Swedish farmhouse interior.
- Nord Library – A research library with a collection focusing on the history of New Sweden and the 19th-century Swedish immigration.
- Linnaeus-Kalm Room – Named after Carl Linnaeus and 18th century botanist Peter Kalm, exhibitions here feature Swedish decorative arts in glass and plants.
- Fredrika Bremer Room – Devoted to the accomplishments of Swedish women and named for Swedish novelist Fredrika Bremer.
- Jenny Lind Room – Devoted to the Swedish operatic singer Jenny Lind and the lasting effects of her widespread popularity in America.
- Chicago Room – Honoring the contributions of Swedish-American architects and builders.
- John Ericsson Room – Wall mural shows John Ericsson presenting his design for the ironclad Monitor (USS Monitor) to the War Cabinet of Abraham Lincoln.
- The Balcony – Paintings and sculptures by Swedish-American artists are exhibited, together with a selection of Swedish furniture.
- Changing Exhibit Gallery – Gallery that changes about 2 times a year.

== Raoul Wallenberg Humanitarian Award ==
The American Swedish Historical Museum Spirit of Raoul Wallenberg Humanitarian Award is presented to an individual, individuals or organization who/which has demonstrated a commitment to humanitarianism through acts which achieve a significant contribution, other than money, to alleviate human suffering or injustice, involved sacrifices or risks and are performed without expectation of reward or recognition. The award is named after Raoul Wallenberg, the Swedish diplomat and his work to save Hungarian Jews during World War II.

The Spirit of Raoul Wallenberg Award consists of a cash prize and a specially designed bowl from Orrefors, Sweden, which is presented to the award recipient at the award ceremony. Past recipients have included A. Leon Higginbotham on the basis of his advocacy on behalf of America's children within the legal profession and his human rights efforts in South Africa, Dr. William P. Magee, Jr. and Kathleen S. Magee for their work in establishing Operation Smile, Per Anger for his collaboration with Raoul Wallenberg in saving Hungarian Jews during World War II and the Reverend Dr. Haruun L. Ruun of Sudan for his efforts to bring peace to the divided state.
