= New Sweden =

Swedish colony in North America (1638–1655)

Coordinates: 39°44′12″N 75°32′19″W

New Sweden Nya Sverige (Swedish)
- 1638–1655
- Flag of Sweden

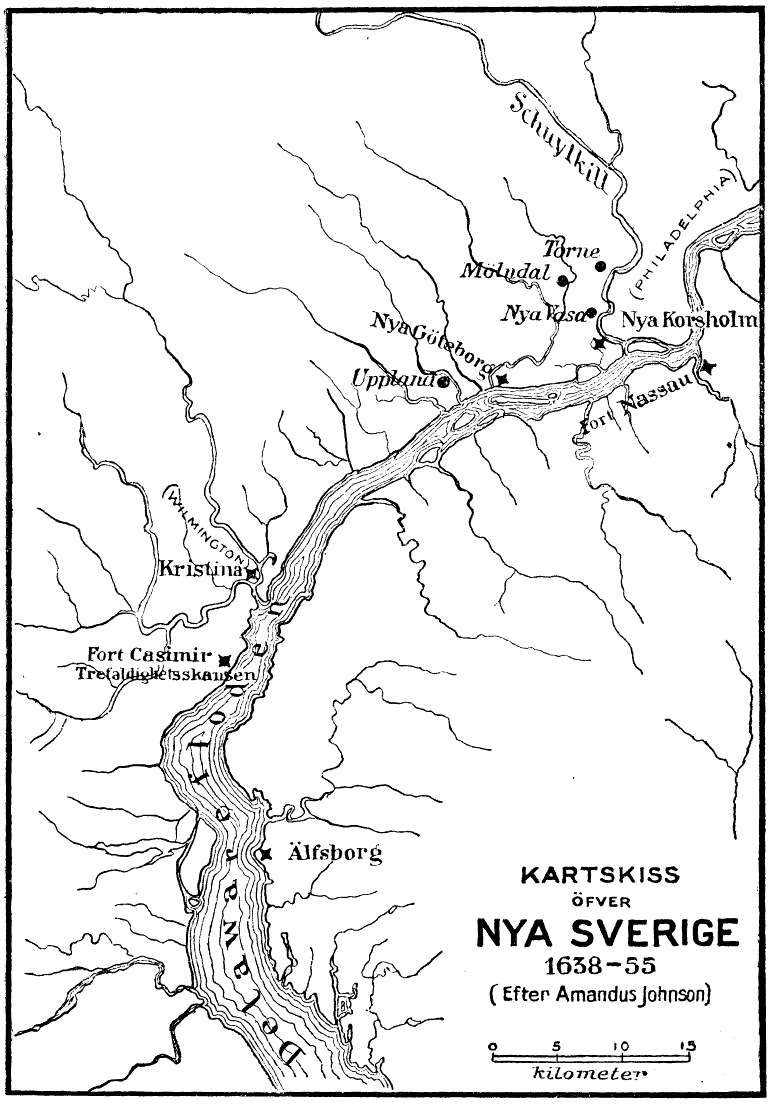
- 1914 map of New Sweden, c. 1650 after a sketch by Amandus Johnson
- Status: Swedish colony
- Capital: Fort Christina
- Common languages: Swedish, Finnish, Munsee, Unami
- Religion: Church of Sweden; Native American religion
- Monarch of Sweden
  - 1632–1654: Christina
  - 1654–1660: Charles X Gustav
- Governor
  - 1638: Peter Minuit
  - 1638–1640: Måns Nilsson Kling
  - 1640–1643: Peter Hollander Ridder
  - 1643–1653: Johan Björnsson Printz
  - 1653–1654: Johan Papegoja
  - 1654–1655: Johan Risingh
- Historical era: Colonial period
  - Established: 1638
  - Dutch conquest: 1655
- Currency: Swedish riksdaler
Preceded by	Succeeded by
New Netherland; Lenapehoking	New Netherland
- Today part of: United States

New Sweden (Swedish: Nya Sverige) was a colony of the Swedish Empire between 1638 and 1655 along the lower reaches of the Delaware River in what is now Delaware, Maryland, New Jersey, and Pennsylvania. Established during the Thirty Years' War when Sweden was a great power, New Sweden was part of the Swedish efforts to colonize the Americas.

Settlements were established on both sides of the Delaware River. Fort Christina, located in what is now Wilmington, Delaware, was the first permanent European settlement in the Delaware Valley and was named after Christina, Queen of Sweden. The settlers were mostly Swedes, Finns, a number of Dutch, and some Germans. New Sweden was conquered by the Dutch Republic in 1655 and incorporated into the Dutch colony of New Netherland.

== History ==
By the middle of the 17th century, Sweden had reached its greatest territorial extent, encompassing Finland and Estonia, as well as parts of present-day Russia, Poland, Germany, Norway and Latvia. It was one of the great powers of Europe during stormaktstiden ("Age of Greatness" or "Great Power Period"). At the same time, other European nations were establishing colonies in the New World and building successful trading empires. Sweden sought to expand its own influence by creating a tobacco plantation and fur-trading colony, aiming to bypass French, English and Dutch merchants.

The Swedish South Company (also known as the Company of New Sweden) was founded in 1626 with a mandate to establish colonies between Florida and Newfoundland for the purposes of trade, particularly along the Delaware River. Its charter included Swedish, Dutch, and German stockholders. The directors of the company included Flemish/Dutch merchant Samuel Blommaert. The company's charter was granted by Gustavus Adolphus, but he became embroiled in the Thirty Years' War, postponing the development of a colony. His death in 1632 further delayed progress. The company sponsored 11 expeditions in 14 separate voyages to Delaware between 1638 and 1655; two were lost.

The first Swedish expedition to America sailed from the port of Gothenburg in late 1637, organized and overseen by Clas Larsson Fleming, a Swedish admiral from Finland. Blommaert assisted the fitting-out and appointed Peter Minuit (the former Governor of New Netherland) to lead the expedition. The expedition sailed into Delaware Bay aboard the Fogel Grip and Kalmar Nyckel; territory that was claimed by the Dutch. They passed Cape May and Cape Henlopen in late March 1638 and anchored on March 29 at a rocky point on the Minquas Kill that is known today as Swedes' Landing. They built a fort at the confluence of the Christina River and Brandywine Creek which they named Fort Christina after their Queen.

In the following years, the area was settled by roughly 600 Swedes and Finns, a number of Dutchmen, a few Germans, a Dane, and at least one Estonian. Minuit served as the first governor of the colony of New Sweden. He had been the third Director of New Netherland, and he knew that the Dutch claimed the area surrounding the Delaware River and its bay. The Dutch West India Company, however, had withdrawn its settlers from the area in order to concentrate on the settlement on Manhattan Island, leaving Fort Nassau on the east side of the Delaware River as the only Dutch outpost on the Delaware River.

Minuit landed on the west bank of the river and met with the sachems of the Lenape and Susquehannock. They held a conclave in Minuit's cabin on the Kalmar Nyckel, and he persuaded the Lenape to sign deeds which he had prepared to resolve any issue with the Dutch. The Swedes claimed that the purchase included land on both sides of the South (Delaware) River from the Schuylkill River down to Delaware Bay in what is now Pennsylvania, Delaware and Maryland. Lenape sachem Mattahoon later claimed that the purchase only included as much land as was contained within an area marked by "six trees", and the rest of the land occupied by the Swedes was stolen.

The Director of New Netherland, Willem Kieft, objected to the Swedish presence, but Minuit ignored him since he knew that the Dutch were militarily weak at the moment. Minuit completed Fort Christina, then sailed for Stockholm to bring a second group of settlers. He made a detour to the Caribbean to pick up a shipment of tobacco to sell in Europe in order to make the voyage profitable; however, he died on this voyage during a hurricane at St. Christopher in the Caribbean. The official duties of the governor of New Sweden were carried out by Captain Måns Nilsson Kling, until a new governor was selected and arrived from Sweden two years later.

The colony expanded along the river under the leadership of Johan Björnsson Printz, governor from 1643 to 1653. They established Fort Nya Elfsborg on the east bank of the Delaware near what is now Salem, New Jersey, and Fort Nya Gothenborg on Tinicum Island. Printz built his manor house, The Printzhof, at Fort Nya Gothenborg, and the Swedish colony prospered for a time. New Sweden established a strong trading relationship with the Susquehannock and supported them in their war against Maryland colonists.

=== Conquest of New Sweden ===
The relative locations of New Netherland (in magenta) and New Sweden (in lavender) in North America with modern state boundaries shown

In 1651, the Dutch West India Company abandoned Fort Nassau and established Fort Casimir on the west side of the Delaware River a few miles south of Fort Christina. In May 1654, soldiers from New Sweden led by Governor Johan Risingh captured Fort Casimir and renamed it Fort Trinity (Trefaldigheten in Swedish). In November 1654, the directors of the Dutch West India Company ordered the Director-General of New Netherland, Peter Stuyvesant, to "drive" the Swedes from the river.

In the summer of 1655, Stuyvesant sailed from New Amsterdam to Delaware Bay with 7 ships and 317 soldiers and quickly retook Fort Casimir (Fort Trinity). Stuyvesant then proceeded to besiege Fort Christina which surrendered on September 15, 1655. During the siege, the Dutch plundered houses and killed livestock in the vicinity of the fort. New Sweden was formally incorporated into New Netherland although the Swedish and Finnish settlers were allowed local autonomy. They retained their own militia, religion, court, and lands. This lasted until the English conquest of New Netherland in 1664 at the beginning of the Second Anglo-Dutch War. The conquest began on August 29, 1664, with the capture of New Amsterdam and ended with the capture of Fort Casimir in October.

In 1669, New Sweden was under English rule, but most of the population was still Swedish. A man named Marcus Jacobsson, posing as a member of the Königsmarck family, attempted to instigate a rebellion against the English to return New Sweden to Swedish rule. The rebellion, known as the Revolt of the Long Swede due to Jacobsson's height, failed. Jacobsson was sold into indentured servitude in Barbados and the families that had supported him were fined for their participation in the revolt.

New Sweden continued to exist unofficially, and some immigration and expansion continued. The first settlement at Wicaco began with a Swedish log blockhouse located on Society Hill in Philadelphia in 1669. It was later used as a church until about 1700, when Gloria Dei (Old Swedes') Church of Philadelphia was built on the site.

=== Hoarkill, New Amstel, and Upland ===
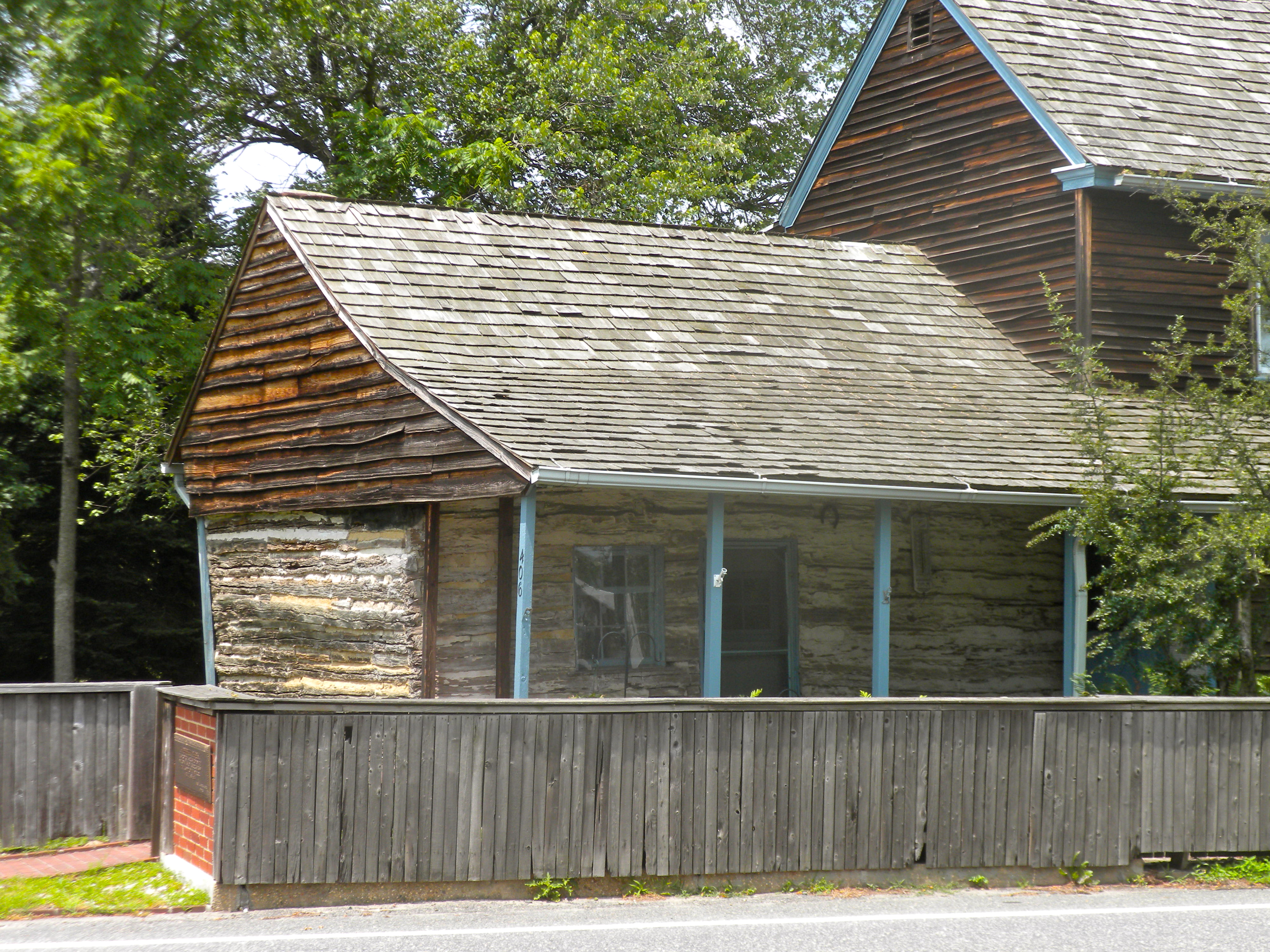
The C. A. Nothnagle Log House in Gibbstown, New Jersey, built in 1638 in New Sweden, is the oldest house in New Jersey.

On September 12, 1673, following the Dutch recapture of the Delaware region from the Third Anglo-Dutch War, Governor Anthony Colve's council erected three territorial courts—Hoarkill, New Amstel, and Upland—whose jurisdictions correspond to the modern counties of Sussex, New Castle and the extinct Upland (later partitioned between Pennsylvania and Delaware).

The Treaty of Westminster of 1674 ended the second period of Dutch control and required them to return all of New Netherland to the English on June 29, including the three counties which they created. After taking stock, the English declared on November 11 that settlements on the west side of the Delaware River and Delaware Bay were to be dependent on the Province of New York, including the three Counties. This declaration was followed by a declaration that renamed New Amstel as New Castle. The other counties retained their Dutch names.

The next step in the assimilation of New Sweden into New York was the extension of the Duke's laws into the region on September 22, 1676. This was followed by the partition of some Upland Counties to conform to the borders of Pennsylvania and Delaware, with most of the Delaware portion going to New Castle County on November 12, 1678. The remainder of Upland continued in place under the same name. On June 21, 1680, New Castle and Hoarkill Counties were partitioned to produce St. Jones County.

On March 4, 1681, what had been the colony of New Sweden was formally partitioned into the colonies of Delaware and Pennsylvania. The border was established 12 miles north of New Castle, and the northern limit of Pennsylvania was set at 42 degrees north latitude. The eastern limit was the border with New Jersey at the Delaware River, while the western limit was undefined. In 1682, Upland ceased to exist as the result of the reorganization of the Colony of Pennsylvania, with the Upland government becoming the government of Chester County, Pennsylvania.

On August 24, 1682, the Duke of York transferred the western Delaware River region to William Penn, including Delaware, thus transferring Deale County and St. Jones County from New York to Delaware. St. Jones County was renamed Kent County, Deale County was renamed Sussex County, and New Castle County retained its name.

Swedish explorer and botanist Pehr Kalm visited the descendants of the early Swedish immigrants to New Sweden in the mid-18th century and documented their experiences with the Native American Indians who resided in those parts, in a book entitled Travels into North America.

== Significance and legacy ==
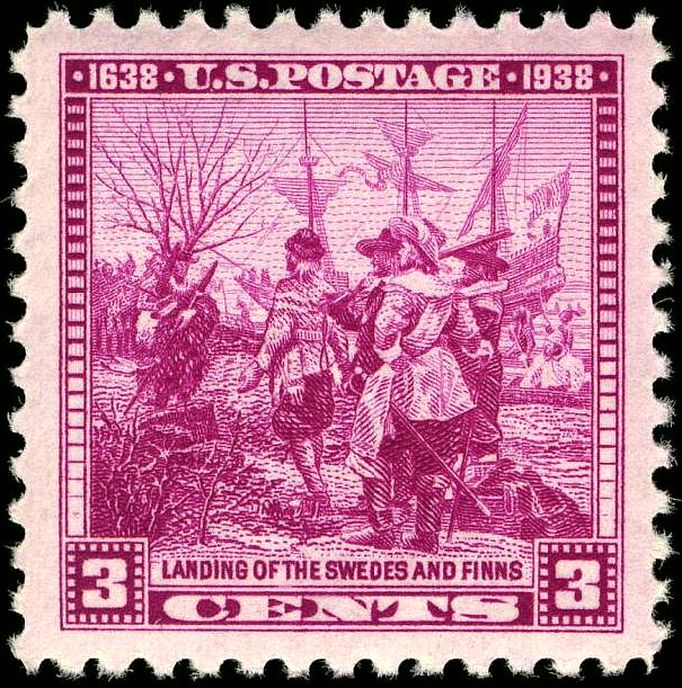
A U.S. Postal stamp commemorating the founding of Wilmington, Delaware, once part of New Sweden (1938)

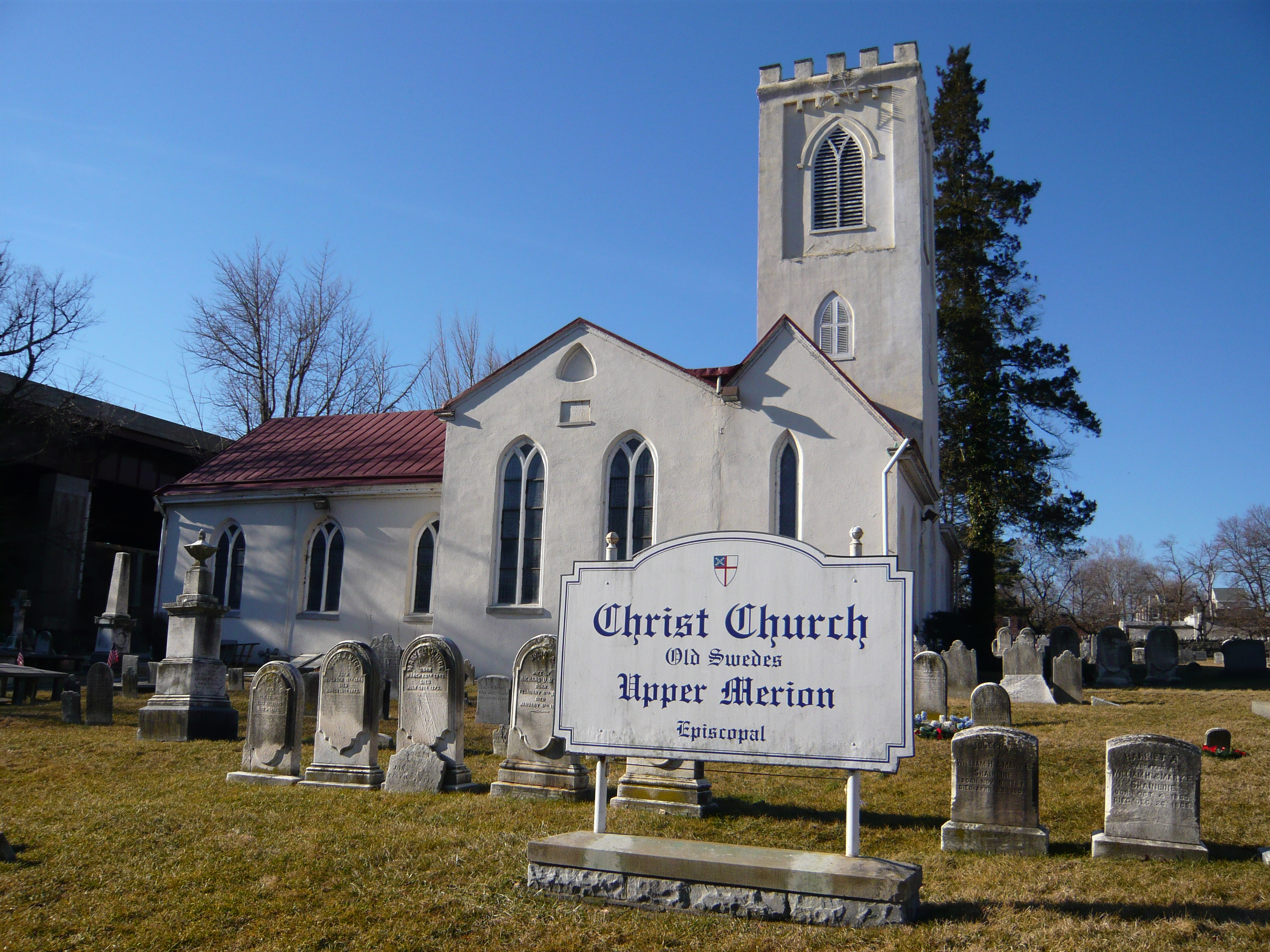
Old Swedes Church, built in the era of New Sweden, in Swedesburg, Pennsylvania

Historian H. Arnold Barton has suggested that the greatest significance of New Sweden was the strong and lasting interest in America that the colony generated in Sweden, although major Swedish immigration did not occur until the late 19th century. From 1870 to 1910, more than one million Swedes arrived in America, settling particularly in Minnesota and other states of the Upper Midwest.

Traces of New Sweden persist in the lower Delaware valley, including Holy Trinity Church in Wilmington, Delaware, Gloria Dei Church and St. James Kingsessing Church in Philadelphia, Trinity Episcopal Church in Swedesboro, New Jersey, and Christ Church in Swedesburg, Pennsylvania. All of those churches are commonly known as "Old Swedes' Church". The town of Kristina (now Christiana, Delaware), named after the Swedish queen Kristina, is one of the few settlements in the area retaining a Swedish name, and the town of Uppland survives as Upland, Pennsylvania. Swedesford Road is still found in Chester and Montgomery Counties, Pennsylvania, although Swedesford has long since become Norristown. Swedeland, Pennsylvania, is part of Upper Merion Township in Montgomery County. The American Swedish Historical Museum in South Philadelphia houses many exhibits, documents, and artifacts from the New Sweden colony.

Perhaps the greatest contribution of New Sweden to the development of the New World is the log house building technique. The colonists of New Sweden brought with them the log cabin, which became such an icon of the American frontier that it is commonly thought of as an American structure. The C. A. Nothnagle Log House on Swedesboro-Paulsboro Road in Gibbstown, New Jersey, is one of the oldest surviving log houses in the United States. Cabin floor plans, such as the dogtrot can be traced to Finnish colonists in New Sweden, as can split-rail fences.

== Finnish influence ==
The settlers came from all over the Swedish realm and many of them were Finnish-speaking. The proportion of Finns in New Sweden grew especially towards the end of the colony.

Many of the Finnish-speaking inhabitants of New Sweden did not come directly from Finland, but from the Finnskogen ("Finn forests") of central Sweden. These communities emerged in the late 1500s and early 1600s, when tens of thousands of Savo Finns migrated from Finland to sparsely populated forest regions, especially Värmland and neighboring provinces. Their migration was encouraged during the reigns of Charles IX and Gustavus Adolphus. These Forest Finns practiced slash-and-burn agriculture, which by the 1630s had become a source of conflict with Swedish authorities, who accused them of destroying valuable timber resources.

In 1640, several Finns sentenced for unlawful slash-and-burn farming in Värmland petitioned to be sent to the colony, prompting the Swedish Crown to consider relocating some of the Forest Finns to New Sweden where settlers were needed. By 1643, provincial governors were instructed to capture and send such forest-destroying Finns to Delaware. A small number of petty criminals from Finland were also sent to the colony, but forced migration never became extensive. By the late 1640s, Forest Finns had grown enthusiastic about opportunities in New Sweden, and hundreds of volunteers petitioned for permission to emigrate.

Finns composed 22 percent of the population during Swedish rule, rising to about 50 percent after the colony came under Dutch control. A group of 140 Finns arrived in 1664, and the ship Mercurius brought another 106 settlers in 1665, 92 of whom were listed as Finns. The exact number of Finns is difficult to determine, as the colonists' language was not recorded and Finnish names were distorted in the official records written in Swedish. Identifications of some surnames, such as Rambo, Cock, or Stille, as derivations of East Finnish names (Romppainen, Kokkoinen, Hiljakainen) have been criticized by the historian Kari Tarkiainen, as the bearers of these names had Swedish-sounding given names or patronymics. In some other cases, identifications rest on similarly weak evidence. In some records, however, Finnish origin was explicitly indicated with the term "Finn".

The Finnish presence is reflected in place names near the Delaware River, including Finland (Marcus Hook), Torne, Lapland, Finns Point, Mullica Hill, and Mullica River. Finnish language did not persist in Delaware, unlike Swedish, which was used as a church language and remained in use until the 18th century.

== Forts ==
Map of New Sweden, c. 1638; modern-day state boundaries are also shown.

- Fort Christina (1638) – at the Brandywine Creek and Christina River in Wilmington, Delaware, later renamed Fort Altena (1655)
- Fort Mecoponacka (1641) – in Chester, near Finlandia or Upland in Delaware County, Pennsylvania
- Fort Nya Elfsborg (1643) – between present-day Salem Creek and Alloway Creek near Bridgeport, New Jersey
- Fort Nya Gothenborg (1643) – on Tinicum Island near the site of The Printzhof in Essington, Delaware County, Pennsylvania
- Fort Nya Vasa (1646) – at Kingsessing, on the eastern-side of Cobbs Creek in Philadelphia
- Fort Nya Korsholm (1647) – on the Schuylkill River near the South River in Philadelphia
- Fort Casimir (1654) – also known as Fort Trinity (in Swedish, Trefaldigheten), located at the end of Chestnut Street near Harmony & 2nd streets in New Castle, Delaware.

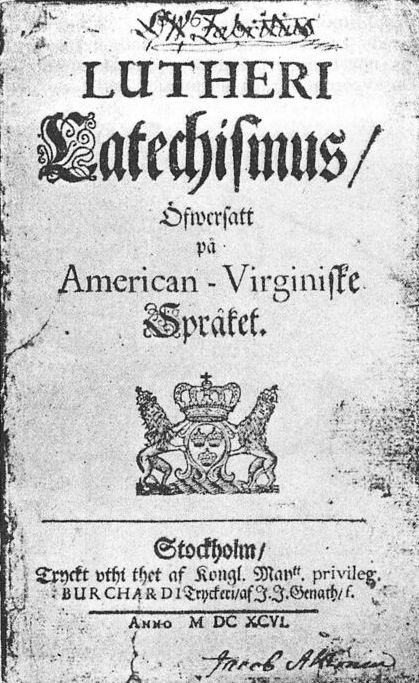
Little Catechism of Martin Luther translated into local Native American languages by Swede Johannes Campanius (from 1696).

== Permanent settlements ==
- Christina (1638 and 1641; modern Wilmington, Delaware)
- Finland, Finlandia, or Chamassungh (1641 and 1643; modern Marcus Hook, Pennsylvania)
- Upland or Uppland (1641 and 1643; modern Chester, Pennsylvania)
- Varkens Kill (1641; modern Salem County, New Jersey)
- Printztorp (1643; modern Chester, Pennsylvania)
- Tequirassy (1643; modern Eddystone, Pennsylvania)
- Tenakonk or Tinicum (1643; modern Tinicum Township, Delaware County, Pennsylvania)
- Provins, Druweeÿland, or Manaiping (1643; modern southwest Philadelphia, on Province Island on the Schuylkill River)
- Minquas or Minqua's Island (1644; modern southwest Philadelphia, Pennsylvania)
- Kingsessing (1644; modern southwest Philadelphia, Pennsylvania)
- Mölndal (1645; modern Yeadon, Pennsylvania)
- Torne (1647; modern West Philadelphia)
- Sveaborg (c. 1649; modern Swedesboro, New Jersey)
- Nya Stockholm (c. 1649; modern Bridgeport, New Jersey)
- Sidoland (1654; modern Wilmington, Delaware)
- Översidolandet (1654; modern Wilmington, Delaware)
- Timmerön or Timber Island (1654; modern Wilmington)
- Strandviken (1654; modern Wilmington)
- Ammansland (1654; modern Darby, Pennsylvania)

== Rivers and creeks ==
- Delaware River: "South River" (Södre Rivier; as opposed to the Hudson), "Swedish River" (Swenskes Rivier), "New Sweden River" (Nya Sweriges Rivier)
- Schuylkill River: "Schuyl Creek" (Schuylen Kÿl) meaning hidden river in Dutch
- Brandywine Creek: "Fish Creek" (Fiske Kÿl in Dutch)
- Christina River: "Susquehanna" (Minquas) or "Christina Creek" (Christina Kÿl)
- Raccoon Creek: "Narraticon" (Lenape) meaning Raccoon
- Salem River: Varkens Kill (Hog Creek in Dutch)
- Mullica River, named for early Swedish settler (with Finnish ancestry), Eric Pålsson Mullica

== See also ==
- American Swedish Historical Museum
- C. A. Nothnagle Log House
- European colonization of the Americas
- Finnish American
- Flag of Philadelphia
- Kalmar Nyckel
- Laurentius Carels, Swedish American Lutheran pastor
- Lower Swedish Cabin
- New Sweden Farmstead Museum
- Olof Persson Stille, first chief justice of the Upland Court
- Possessions of Sweden
- Rambo apple
- Swedish American
- Swedish emigration to North America
- Old Swedes' Church
- Upland Court
- Wedge (border)
