= Johan Papegoja =

- Died: March 23, 1667
- Known for: Governor of the Swedish colony of New Sweden
