= Amandus Johnson =

American historian

Dr. Amandus Johnson

Amandus Johnson (October 27, 1877 – June 30, 1974) was a Swedish-American historian, author and museum director. He is most associated with his epic two volume history The Swedish Settlements on the Delaware 1638-1664, which was also published in Swedish as Den första svenska kolonien i Amerika (1923).

== Biography ==
Amandus Johnson was born at Långasjö in Emmaboda Municipality, Kalmar, Sweden. His family emigrated to America and settled in Rice Lake, Minnesota in 1880. Johnson studied at Gustavus Adolphus College and in 1904 took a bachelor's degree. He earned a master's degree at the University of Colorado at Boulder. He received his doctorate in 1908 from the University of Pennsylvania where he wrote his doctoral dissertation Swedish Settlements on the Delaware, 1638-1664 on the Swedish colony of New Sweden. In 1908, Johnson was one of the cofounders of the Swedish Colonial Society. Amandus Johnson was a senior lecturer in Scandinavian languages at the University of Pennsylvania from 1910 to 1921.

Johnson was the founding curator of the American Swedish Historical Museum and museum director and curator 1921–1943. In 1943, he was named emeritus Curator. Dr. Amandus Johnson served as a governor of the Swedish Colonial Society 1958-1960 .

== Amandus Johnson Papers ==
Originally deposited at the Balch Institute, the Amandus Johnson Papers, including correspondence, manuscripts, organizational records and research materials, are available for research use at the Historical Society of Pennsylvania.

== Selected bibliography ==
- The Swedish Settlements on the Delaware Volume I: Their History and Relation to the Indians, Dutch and English, 1638-1664 (1911)
- The Swedes in America 1638-1900: Vol. I, The Swedes on the Delaware 1638-1664. (1914)
- Johan Classon Rising: The last governor of New Sweden (1915)
- The Indians and Their Culture as Described in Swedish and Dutch Records (1917)
- The Swedish Settlements on the Delaware 1638-1664, Volume 2 (1927)
- Instruction For Johan Printz, Governor Of New Sweden, "The First Constitution or Supreme Law Of The States Of Pennsylvania And Delaware. (1930)
- Mbundu English-Portuguese dictionary: With grammar and syntax (1931)
- The Journal and Biography of Nicholas Collin 1746-1831 (1936)
- Swedish contributions to American freedom, 1776-1783: Including a sketch of the background of the Revolution, together with an account of the engagements (1953)

== Other sources ==
- Benson, Adolph B.; Naboth Hedin Swedes in America, 1638-1938 (Swedish American Tercentenary Association. 1938)
