= Fort Christina =

Site of first Swedish settlement in North America

- U.S. National Register of Historic Places
- U.S. National Historic Landmark
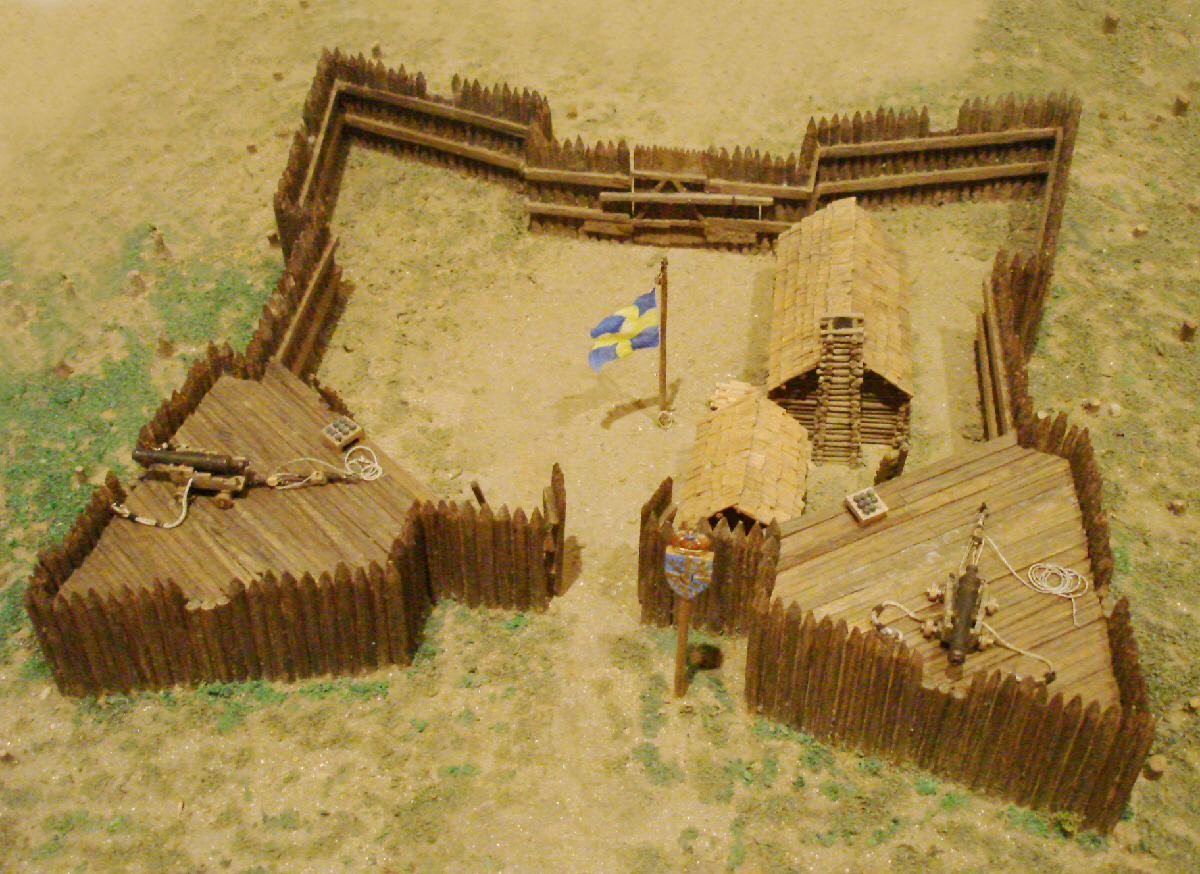
- Model of Fort Christina at the American Swedish Historical Museum in Philadelphia

- Location within Delaware Location within the United States
- Location: East 7th St. at the Christina River, Wilmington, Delaware
- Coordinates: 39°44′14″N 075°32′18″W
- Built: 1638
- NRHP reference No.: 66000260

Significant dates
- Added to NRHP: October 15, 1966
- Designated NHL: November 5, 1961

Fort Christina, also called Fort Altena, was the first Swedish settlement in North America and the principal settlement of the New Sweden colony. Built in 1638 and named after Christina, Queen of Sweden, it was located approximately 1 mi (1.6 km) east of the present-day downtown Wilmington, Delaware, at the confluence of the Brandywine River and the Christina River, approximately 2 mi (3 km) upstream from the mouth of the Christina on the Delaware River.

== History ==
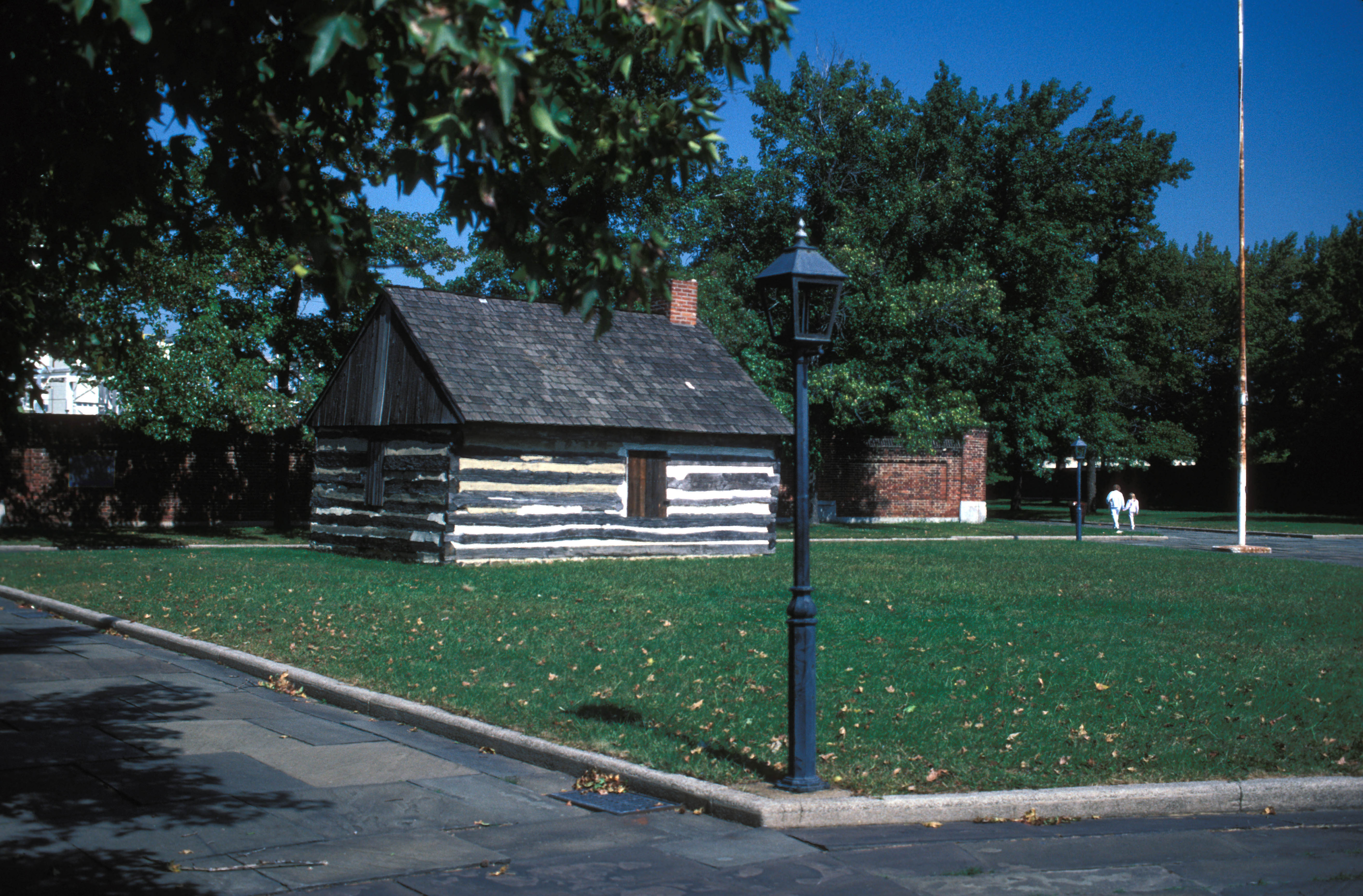
A Swedish colonial era log cabin at the fort

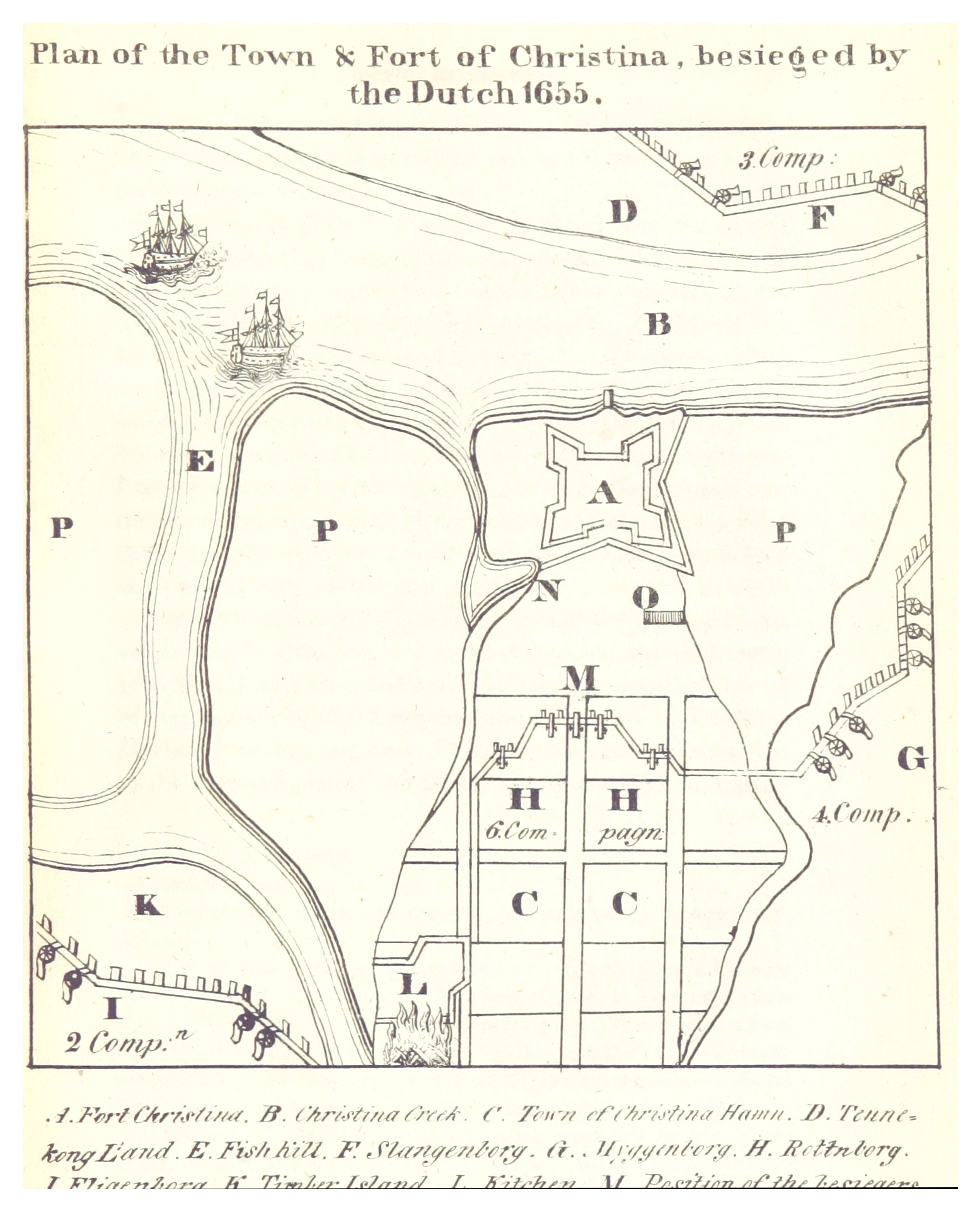
Plan of the Town and Fort of Christina, published in 1834

Following plans by King Gustavus Adolphus of Sweden to establish a Swedish colony in North America, the Swedes arrived in Delaware Bay (Fort Christina) on March 29, 1638, aboard the ships Kalmar Nyckel and Fogel Grip under the command of Peter Minuit, the former director of the New Netherland colony. They landed at a spot along the Christina River at a stone outcropping which formed a natural wharf, known as "The Rocks." Minuit selected the site on the Christina River near the Delaware as being optimal for trade in beaver pelts with the local Lenape. He also considered the site easily defensible, and he ordered the construction of an earthwork fort around the Rocks.

At the time, the Dutch had claimed the area south to the Delaware (then called "South River"). The Swedes claimed an area for the Realm of Sweden on the south side of the Delaware that encompassed much of the present-day U.S. state of Delaware, eventually including parts of present-day southeastern Pennsylvania and southern New Jersey on the north side of the river.

The fort's earthworks were strengthened in 1640 by Governor Peter Hollander Ridder to help defend against the possibility of Dutch or Native American attacks. As additional colonists arrived from Sweden in the years following the landing, homes and farms began to be built outside of the confines of the fort. The fort was rebuilt entirely in 1647.

The colony of New Sweden remained in constant friction with the Dutch. In 1651, the Dutch under Peter Stuyvesant established Fort Casimir at present-day New Castle, only 7 mi (12 km) south of Fort Christina, in order to menace the Swedish settlement. In 1654, the Swedes captured Fort Casimir under the orders of Governor Johan Risingh. Risingh, fearing reprisals, strengthened the defenses of Fort Christina by adding a wooden palisade around the earthworks.

In 1655, the Dutch under Stuyvesant returned in force and laid siege to Fort Christina. The fort's surrender after ten days ended the official Swedish colonial presence in North America, though most of the colonists remained and were allowed to continue their linguistic and religious practices by the Dutch. Stuyvesant renamed Fort Christina as Fort Altena. While the struggle for Fort Christina and Fort Casimir involved hundreds of mercenaries and chartered warships, and was run personally by Stuyvesant, it was not seen at the time as a war between the Dutch Republic and the Kingdom of Sweden. It was rather a struggle between the Dutch West India Company and the Swedish West India Company.

The land remained as part of New Netherland until it became part of the English possessions when an English fleet invaded the area in 1664. Under English rule, the original Swedish fortifications around the Rocks fell into disrepair and eventually vanished entirely.

New fortifications were built by the Americans on the same site during the Revolutionary period, and they established Fort Union here during the War of 1812. Men involved in the defense of the fort included Caesar Augustus Rodney and James A. Bayard Sr.

During the nineteenth century, the peninsula where the fort once stood became heavily industrialized, and included factories for the Jackson and Sharp Company and Mingus Iron Works.

== Fort Christina National Historic Landmark ==
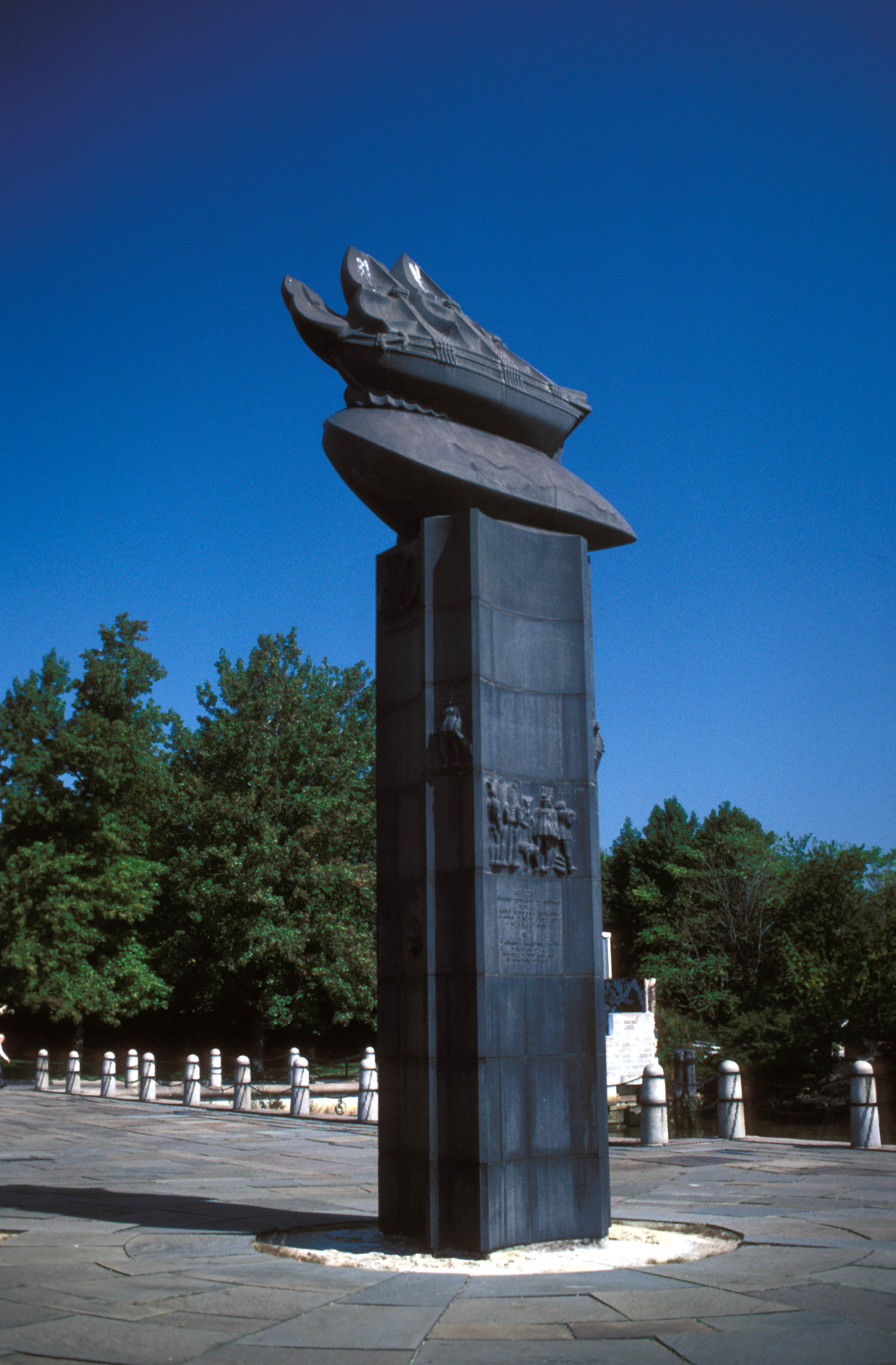
Fort Christina monument

In 1938, to celebrate the 300th anniversary of the Swedish colonization of the area, the state of Delaware created a park which contained the Rocks and the site of the former forts. The dedication was attended by U.S. President Franklin D. Roosevelt, Crown Prince Gustav Adolf, Crown Princess Louise, and Prince Bertil. The Prince presented a gift from their homeland: a monument, topped by a replica of the Kalmar Nyckel, designed by Swedish sculptor Carl Milles.

During the ceremony, the Prince spoke of the site's significance to both countries:

The monument to be unveiled today is a gift from the people of Sweden to the people of the United States. The funds were raised through public subscription, wherein several hundred thousands of our citizens took part. I believe that amongst these subscribers, many had across the Atlantic brothers and sisters, parents and children. In contributing, they must have felt the links, which connect them and all of us with your great country, where so many of the citizens are either of Swedish birth or purely or partly of Swedish descent.

Near this spot, the Fort Christina State Park, was the first permanent settlement in the Delaware Valley. The Swedes, who landed here 300 years ago, were few in number and of poor means. Yet thus began the relations between our two Nations. Indeed, it is fitting that, together, we should commemorate that event, the inauguration of an unbroken period of international friendship.

We shall be reminded of these facts by the monument, cut by our famous sculptor, Carl Milles, in the black granite of Sweden. What memories are summoned forth at a moment like this. It is with pride we recall the memory of those almost legendary pioneers who braved the Atlantic in their little vessel, the Kalmar Nyckel, and who came to found the colony of New Sweden. That little band of gallant men and women have inscribed their names on the pages of history. Their deeds have been considered important enough for the President and Congress of the United States to extend an official invitation to Sweden to take part in the commemorative celebration of this historic event. We of Sweden are deeply moved by this mark of your esteem. It meets with our high appreciation and we offer you our most sincere thanks.

In our common acclaim of a historic event of 300 years ago, we stand united, as in our admiration of those early settlers from Sweden who were such worthy and resourceful people. Their love of freedom and their integrity they carried with them as a heritage from the land of their birth. We are happy to feel that in some measure they, as well as their successors during the intervening three centuries, were able to contribute to the development into greatness of your country, the country of their adoption. We are proud to think that their virtue and valor were brought down to their descendants and thus helped in the formation of those traits which we admire in the American people of the present day.

President Roosevelt, in accepting the monument, responded that, "I am fortunate in having personal association with the colony of Sweden, for one of my ancestors, William Beekman, served as vice director or governor of the colony of New Sweden on the Delaware River from 1658 to 1663."

In May 2013, for the 375th anniversary of the Swedish landing, King Carl XVI Gustaf and Queen Silvia of Sweden, along with U.S. Vice President Joe Biden, reenacted the landing of the Kalmar Nyckel at Fort Christina Park on a replica of the original ship.

The site was designated a National Historic Landmark in 1961. In 2014, the First State National Historical Park was authorized to potentially include Fort Christina; it now is part of the site.

== Literary references ==
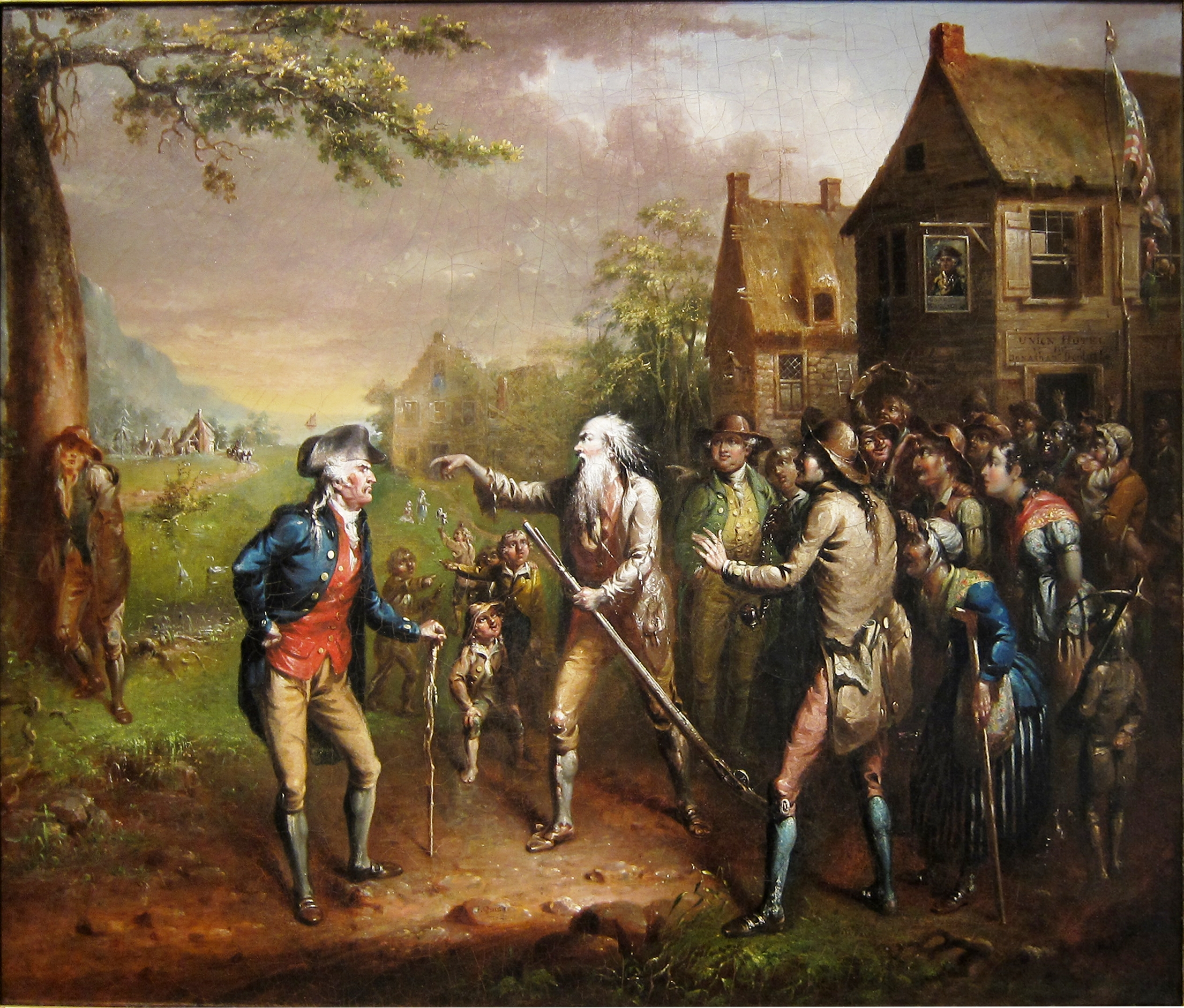
Illustration for Washington Irving's "Rip Van Winkle"

American author and essayist Washington Irving (1783–1859) refers to Fort Christina in the opening pages of his short story "Rip van Winkle", describing the genealogy of his Dutch protagonist:

In that same village, and in one of these very houses, (which, to tell the precise truth, was sadly time-worn and weather-beaten), there lived many years since, while the country was yet a province of Great Britain, a simple good-natured fellow named Rip Van Winkle. He was a descendant of the Van Winkles who figured so gallantly in the chivalrous days of Peter Stuyvesant and accompanied him to the siege of Fort Christina.

== See also ==
- Swedish colonization of the Americas
- Old Swedes Church, the oldest Swedish church in America a block away from Fort Christina, with burial sites dating back to the 1630s
- Fort Nya Elfsborg
- Lenapehoking
- National Register of Historic Places listings in Wilmington, Delaware
