= Nicholas Collin =

American Lutheran minister and inventor

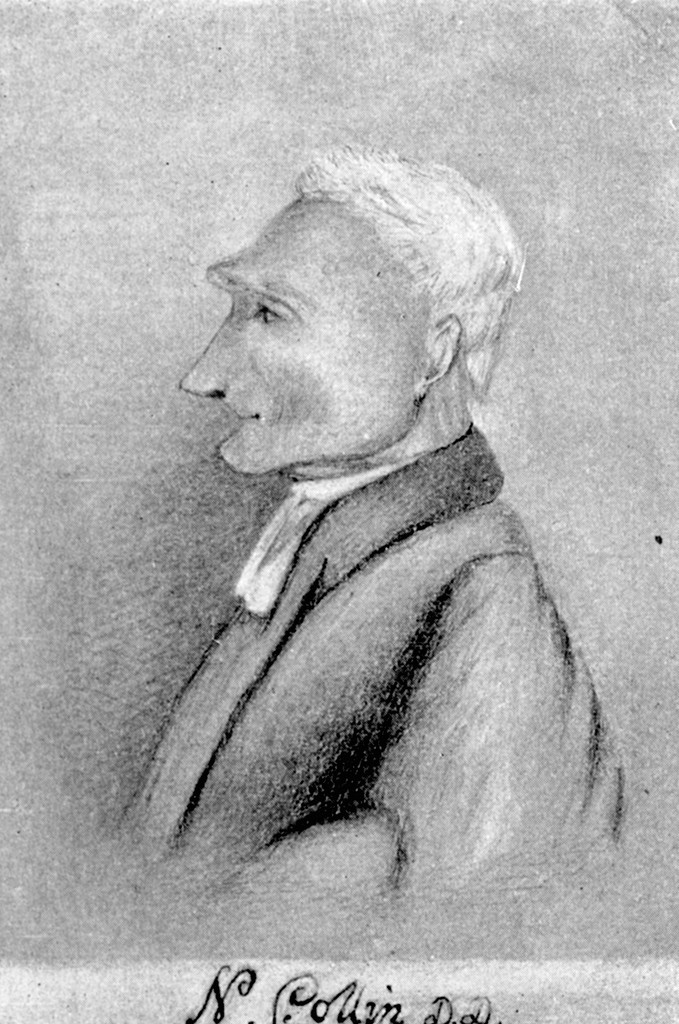
- Born: Nils Collin; August 2, 1746; Uppland, Sweden
- Died: October 7, 1831 (aged 85); Philadelphia, Pennsylvania
- Education: Uppsala University
- Occupation: Minister
- Spouse: Hannah Fisler Collin
- Parent(s): Nils Collin; Maria Nordstedt
- Religion: Lutheranism
- Church: Church of Sweden
- Ordained: 1769
- Congregations served: Trinity Church (1770–1786) St. George's Episcopal Church (1772–1786); Gloria Dei Church (1786–1831)

Nicholas Collin (August 2, 1746 – October 7, 1831) was a Swedish-born American Lutheran minister and inventor.

== Early life ==
Nils Collin was born on August 2, 1746, in Uppland, Sweden. His parents were Lutheran minister Nils Collin and Maria Nordstedt. In 1769, Collin graduated from Uppsala University with a Master of Philosophy and was ordained as a priest in the Church of Sweden, like his father. Collin was subsequently sent by the church to minister to its congregants in Britain's North American colonies in the same year, arriving there in 1770. Collin began to minister at the Trinity Church in Swedesboro, New Jersey as a curate. Two years later in 1772, he began to also minister at St. George's Episcopal Church in Churchtown, New Jersey, having risen to the position of rector.

== American Revolution ==
During the American Revolution, Collin attempted to remain neutral as he was a Swedish subject and did not wish to take sides. In the American Revolutionary War, he continued to minister to the remaining members of his congregation, following a Loyalist congregant to his execution at the hands of Patriots. Collin also attempted to prevent Hessian soldiers from burning down a schoolhouse in New Jersey.

His neutrality led to Collin to be distrusted by both sides, and he was temporarily imprisoned by a group of Patriots who forced him to swear an oath of neutrality. He was subsequently arrested by Patriot militiamen who threatened him with summary execution on a false accusation before releasing him. Collin later wrote that "Everywhere, distrust, fear, hatred, and abominable selfishness" reigned.

== Later life and death ==
After the American victory in the war led to the foundation of the United States in 1783, Collin was offered the opportunity to return to Sweden, though he declined. In 1784, as he was a senior minister in the New Jersey branch of the Church of Sweden, Collin served as an ex officio member of the University of the State of Pennsylvania's board of trustees, remaining on the board until 1791. In 1786, he began to minister at the Gloria Dei Church in Philadelphia, Pennsylvania after leaving his old churches.

In 1788, he became a Doctor of Divinity at the University of the State of Pennsylvania. Collin also demonstrated a fledgling interest in American politics, supporting conservative views as a member of the Federalist Party. Under the pseudonym Foreign Spectator, he participated in the debates over the design and ratification of the Constitution of the United States, writing a series of 29 influential essays published under the general heading of "An Essay on the Means of Promoting Federal Sentiments in the United States". Collin published them in the Philadelphia newspaper Independent Gazetteer.

In 1793, as Collin was an amateur inventor, he became a member of the Royal Swedish Academy of Sciences; joining the Royal Society of Sciences in Uppsala nine years later in 1802. Collin was awarded the Magellanic Premium by the American Philosophical Society in 1795 for his inventions. When the Swedish pastor in New Castle County, Delaware died in 1791, Collin became sole Church of Sweden clergyman in the United States. Though the use of the Swedish language in the U.S. rapidly declined during the period, he continued to preach sermons in Swedish into the 1820's. Collin continued to preach at Gloria Dei Church until his death in Philadelphia on October 7, 1831, at the age of 85. According to historian Henry Simpson, Collin was consistently held in great respect by his congregations, in particular for his academic knowledge.
