= Gloria Dei (Old Swedes') Church =

National Historic Site of the United States

- U.S. National Register of Historic Places
- Pennsylvania state historical marker
- National Historic Site
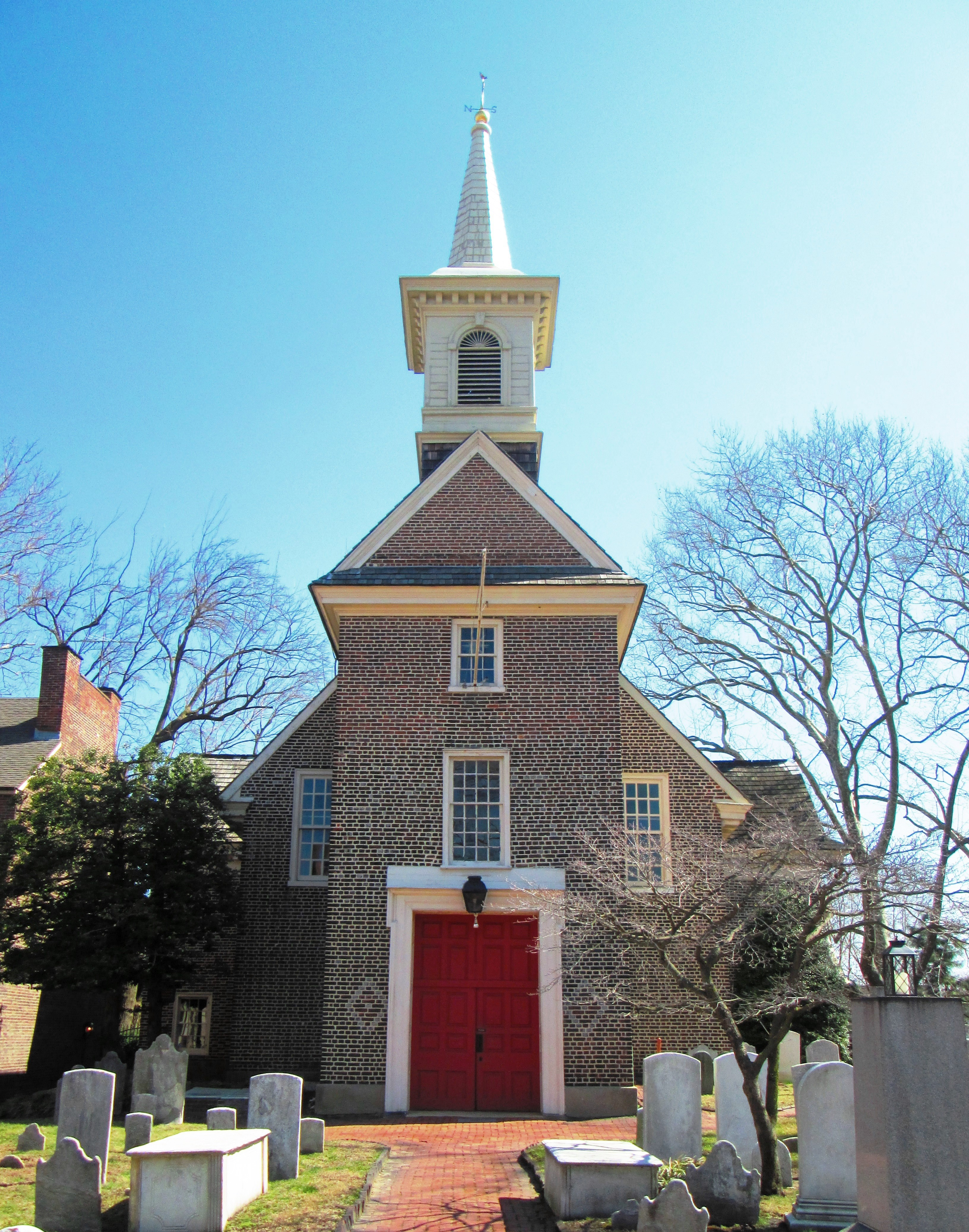
- The church in March 2014

- Location within Philadelphia Location within Pennsylvania Location within the United States
- Location: 929 South Water Street; Philadelphia, Pennsylvania
- Coordinates: 39°56′04″N 75°08′37″W
- Area: 3.7 acres (1.5 ha)
- Built: 1678–1700 additions: 1703, c. 1733
- Architectural style: English vernacular
- Website: Official site
- NRHP reference No.: 66000682

Significant dates
- Added to NRHP: October 15, 1966
- Designated PHMC: December 17, 1954

Gloria Dei Church, known locally as Old Swedes', is a historic church located in the Southwark neighborhood of Philadelphia, Pennsylvania, at 929 South Water Street, bounded by Christian Street on the north, South Christopher Columbus Boulevard (formerly Delaware Avenue) on the east, and Washington Avenue on the south. The church reported 162 members in 2017 and 181 members in 2023; no membership statistics were reported in 2024 parochial reports. Plate and pledge income reported for the congregation in 2024 was $64,342. Average Sunday attendance (ASA) in 2024 was 38 persons.

The church was built between 1698 and 1700, making it the oldest church in Pennsylvania and second oldest Swedish church in the United States after Holy Trinity Church (Old Swedes) in Wilmington, Delaware. The carpenters for the building were John Smart and John Buett and bricks were supplied by Richard Cantril. The church displays the English vernacular style of church design, which combines elements of the Medieval and Gothic styles. The church's vestry and entranceway were added in 1703 to buttress the walls, which had begun to buckle under the weight of the roof. The tower was added c.1733, and interior alterations were made in 1845, designed by Samuel Sloan.

The congregation was established on Tinicum Island in 1646. It moved to its present site in 1677, five years before the founding of the city of Philadelphia, and the graveyard around the church to about the same time. Formerly a Swedish Lutheran congregation, the church has been Episcopalian since 1845.

== History ==
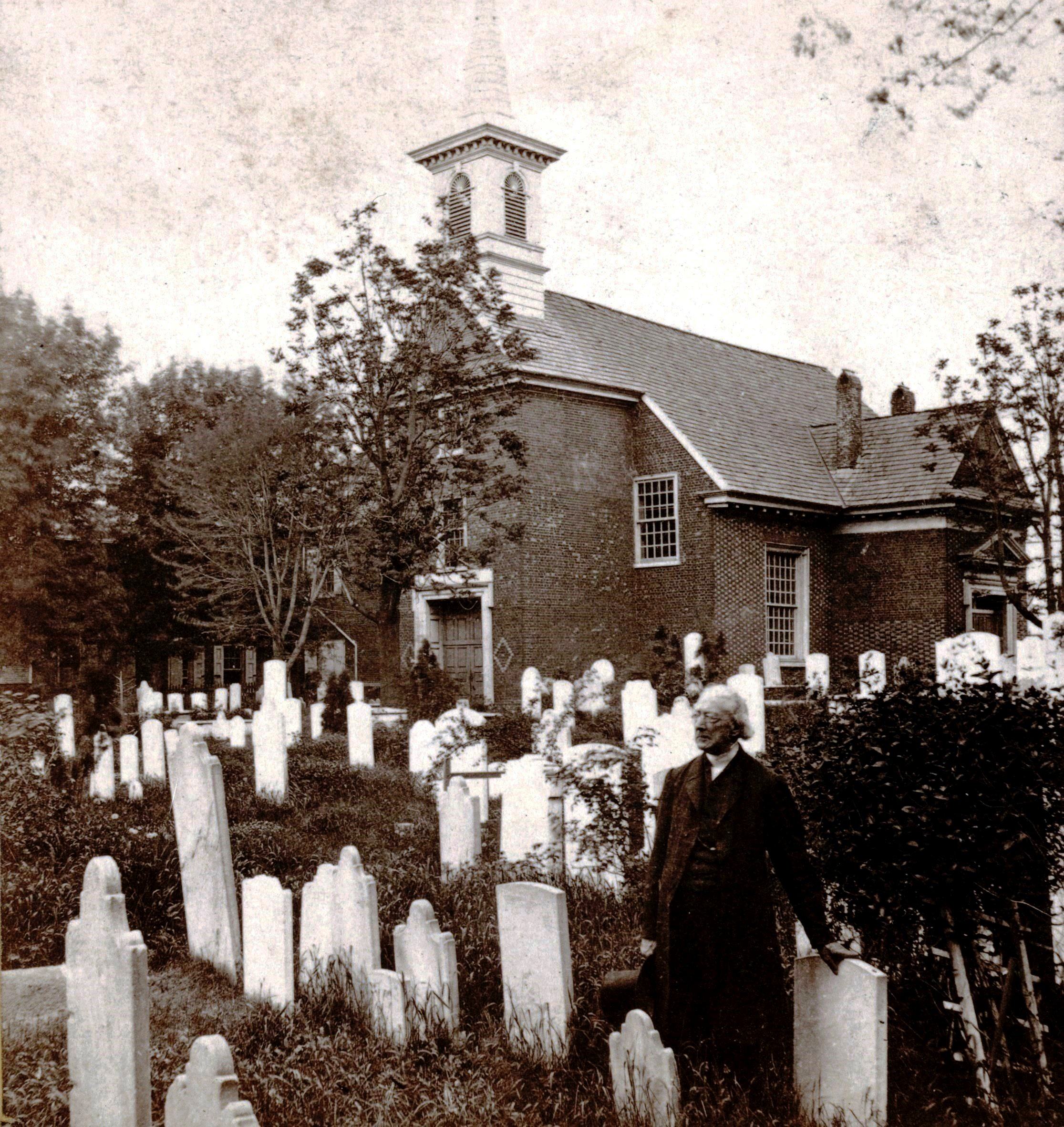
The Reverend Jehu Curtis Clay in the churchyard (c.1860)

Gloria Dei is the oldest church in Pennsylvania and second oldest Swedish church in the United States after Holy Trinity Church (Old Swedes) in Wilmington, Delaware. Swedish pioneers of New Sweden were the first to settle the area in 1646. An existing blockhouse at Wicaco (now South Philadelphia), had been renovated for worship in 1677 and was used until the present church (built beginning in 1698) was consecrated on the First Sunday after Trinity, June 2, 1700. Colonial painter Gustavus Hesselius was a member here.

In 1703, Gloria Dei was the site of the first regular Lutheran ordination in the Americas, that of Justus Falckner, a German theology student. Jenny Lind sang here during one of her American tours. Hanging in the center aisle is a Swedish chandelier given by famous Swedish artist Carl Milles. Recollections of many Swedish royal and episcopal visits are treasured memories, including models of Fogel Grip and Kalmar Nyckel, the first Swedish ships to arrive in New Sweden.

The church has a collection of historical and religious artifacts the church has acquired over three centuries, including bronze crosses and 18th century Bibles in Swedish and English. In 1845, the formerly Swedish Lutheran congregation joined the Episcopal Church. Today the church is owned and maintained by its congregation of Episcopalians.

The church was designated a National Historic Site on November 17, 1942. It is an affiliated area of the National Park Service under Independence National Historical Park. The church site is owned and administered by the Corporation of Gloria Dei (Old Swedes') Church. It was listed on the National Register of Historic Places on October 15, 1966.

Gloria Dei shared an annual brotherhood service with the Neziner Congregation synagogue located on South 2nd Street by Catherine. The two congregations held one in 1947 and again in 1949. Neziner joined Goria Dei Old Swedes in February 1954 to welcome Governor John S. Fine opening Brotherhood Week. In February 1956, members of Old Swedes attended Neziner for Purim eve services and celebrations, and Neziner attended Old Swedes in support of Brotherhood Week. Neziner would close in 1983 and be absorbed into Temple Beth Zion-Beth Israel in Rittenhouse Square.

== Swedish pastors ==
- Andreas Rudman, 1697-1702
- Andreas Sandel, 1702-1719
- Jonas Lidman, 1719-1730
- Johan Eneberg, acting 1730-1733
- Johannes Dylander, 1737-1741
- Gabriel Näsman, 1743-1750
- Olof Parlin, 1750-1757
- Erik Nordenlind, acting 1757-1759
- Carl Magnus Wrangel, 1759-1768
- Anders Göransson, 1768-1779
- Matthias Hultgren, 1779-1786
- Nicholas Collin, 1786-1831

== Cemetery ==
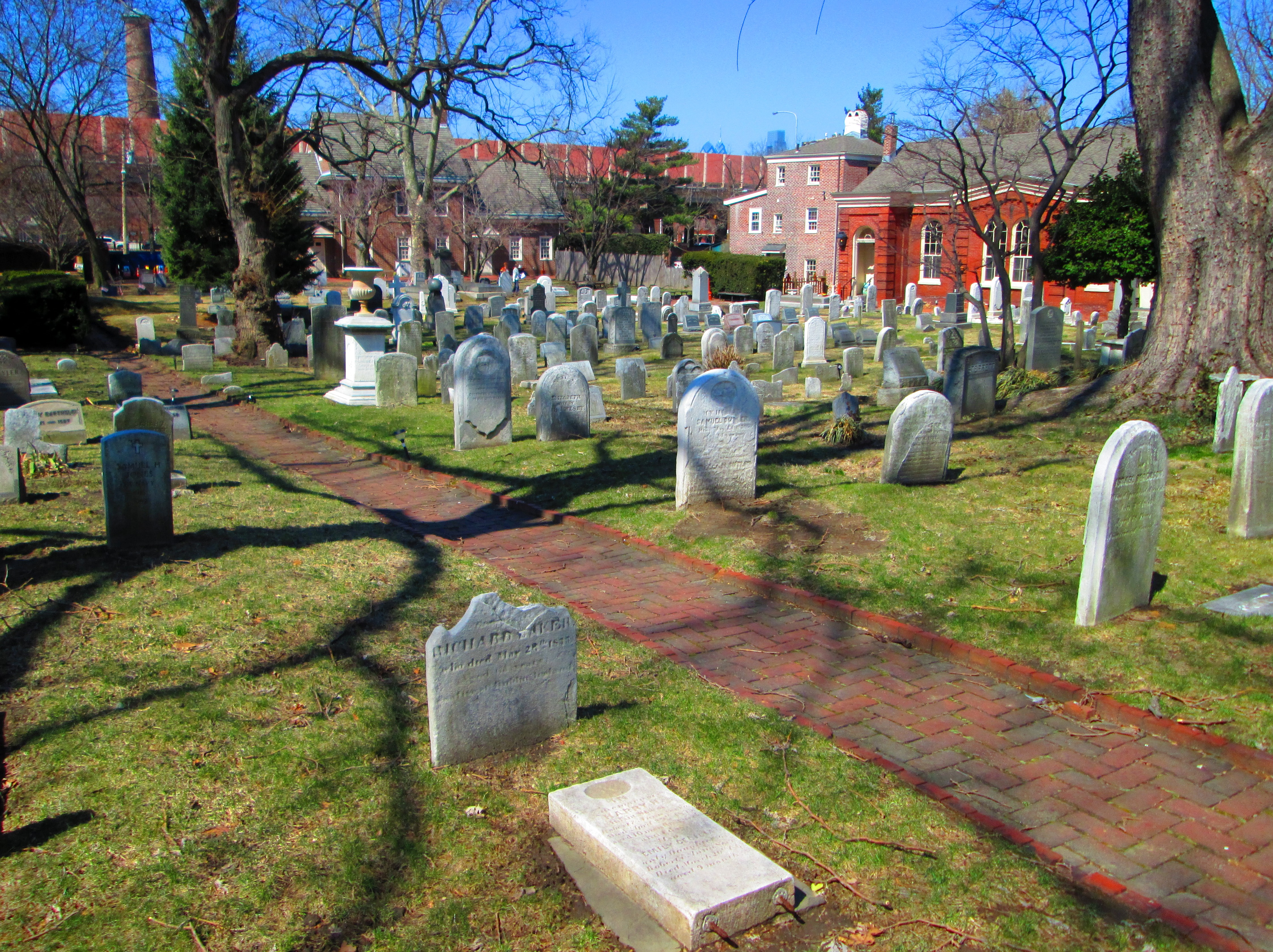
Part of the church's graveyard in 2014

The church cemetery includes the following interments:

- Johan Dylander, pastor 1737-1741
- Sven Gunnarsson (d. 1678), one of the first buried at the church, a founding father of the New Sweden colony
- John C. Hunterson (1841-1927), American Civil War soldier and Medal of Honor recipient
- William Irvine (1741–1804), American Revolutionary War officer and physician
- Amandus Johnson (1877–1974), Swedish-American scholar and founder of the American Swedish Historical Museum
- George Ord (1781–1866), ornithologist
- Andreas Rudman, pastor 1698-1702
- James Peale (1749–1831), American Revolutionary War officer, artist, and brother of Charles Willson Peale
- Sarah Miriam Peale (1800–1885) portrait painter and daughter of James Peale
- Peter Gunnarsson Rambo (1611–1698), Swedish immigrant who became known as "the Father of New Sweden"
- Alexander Wilson (1766–1813), ornithologist and illustrator

== Gallery ==
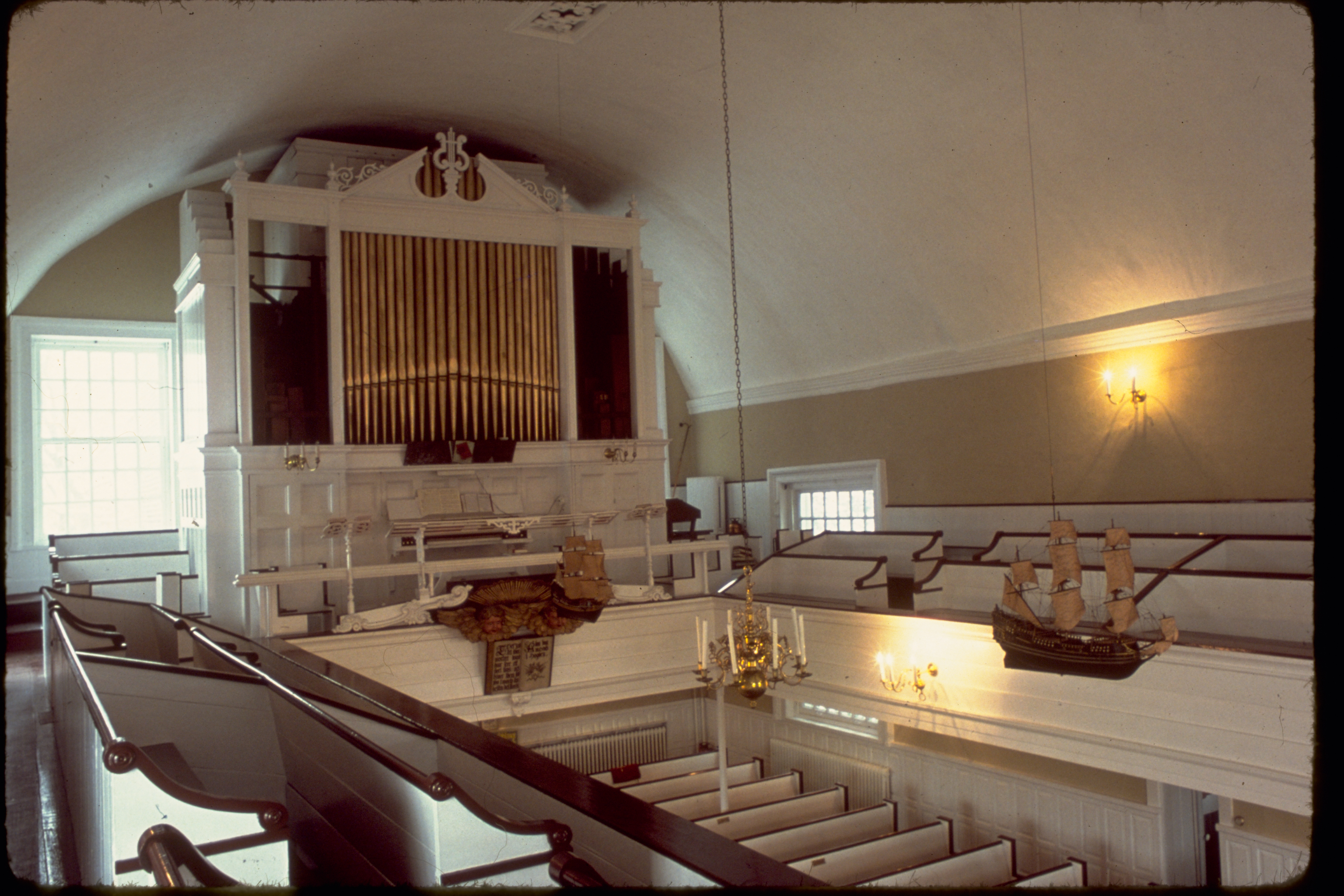
Church interior with balcony and organ

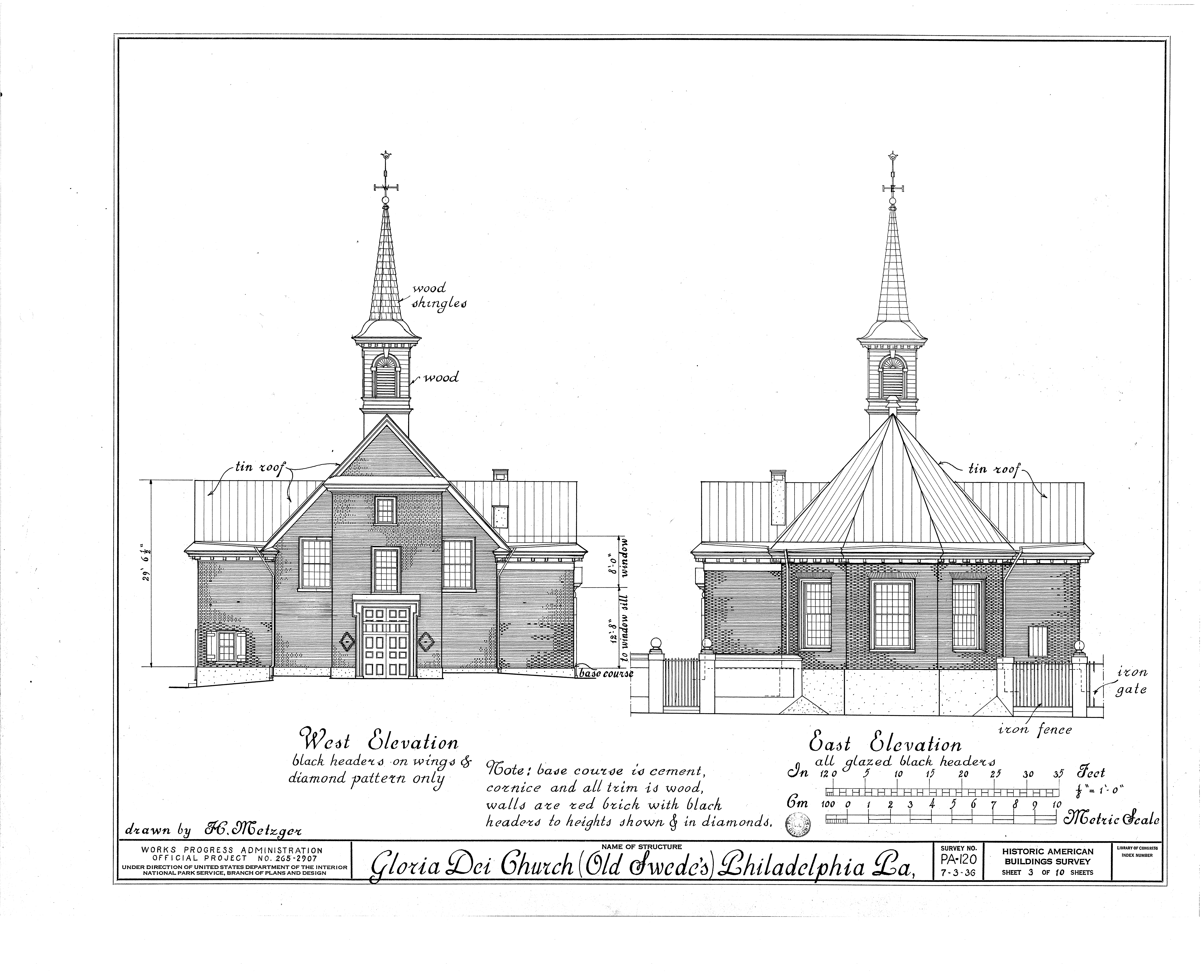
Architectural drawing of the church's west and east sides

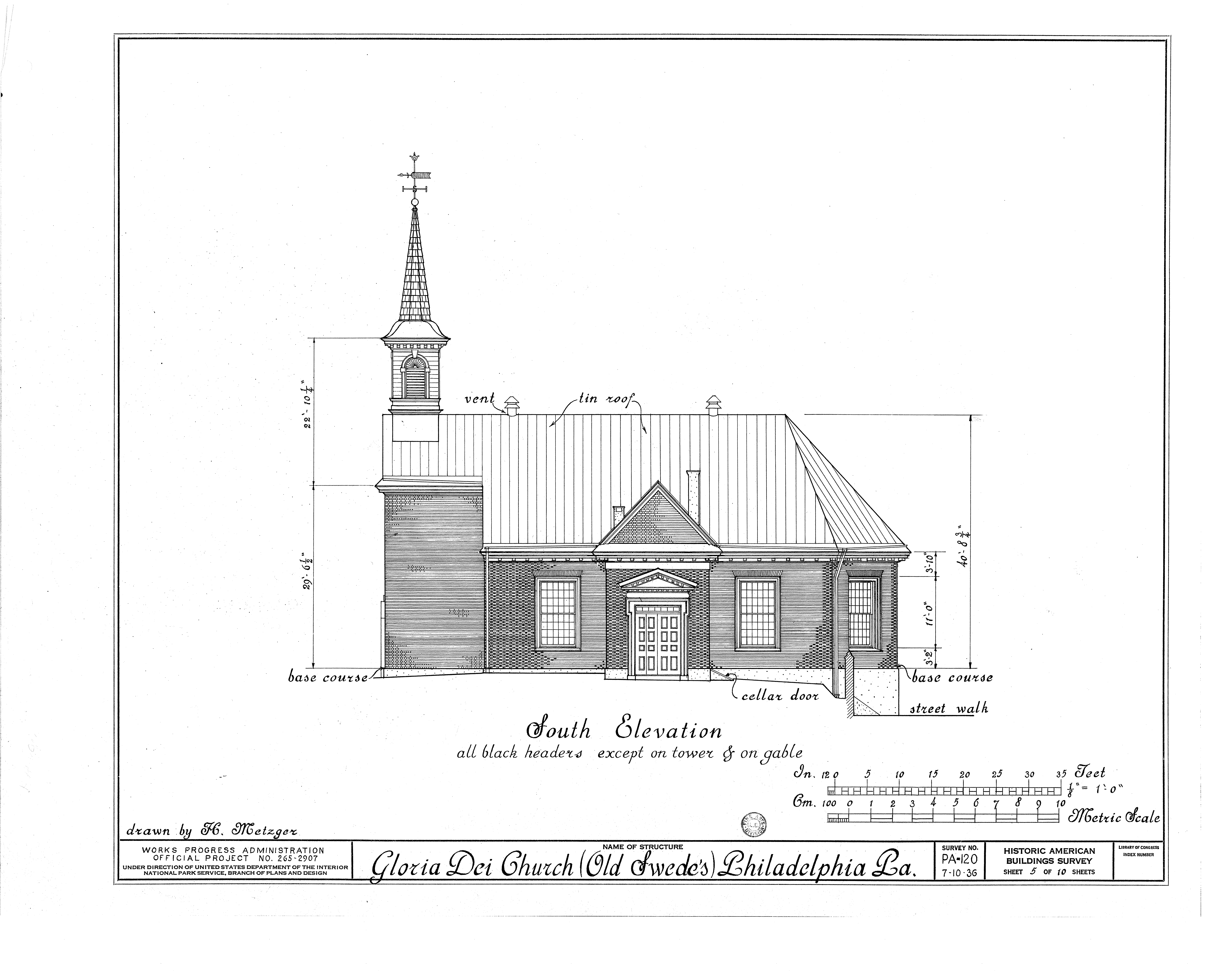
Drawing of the church's south side

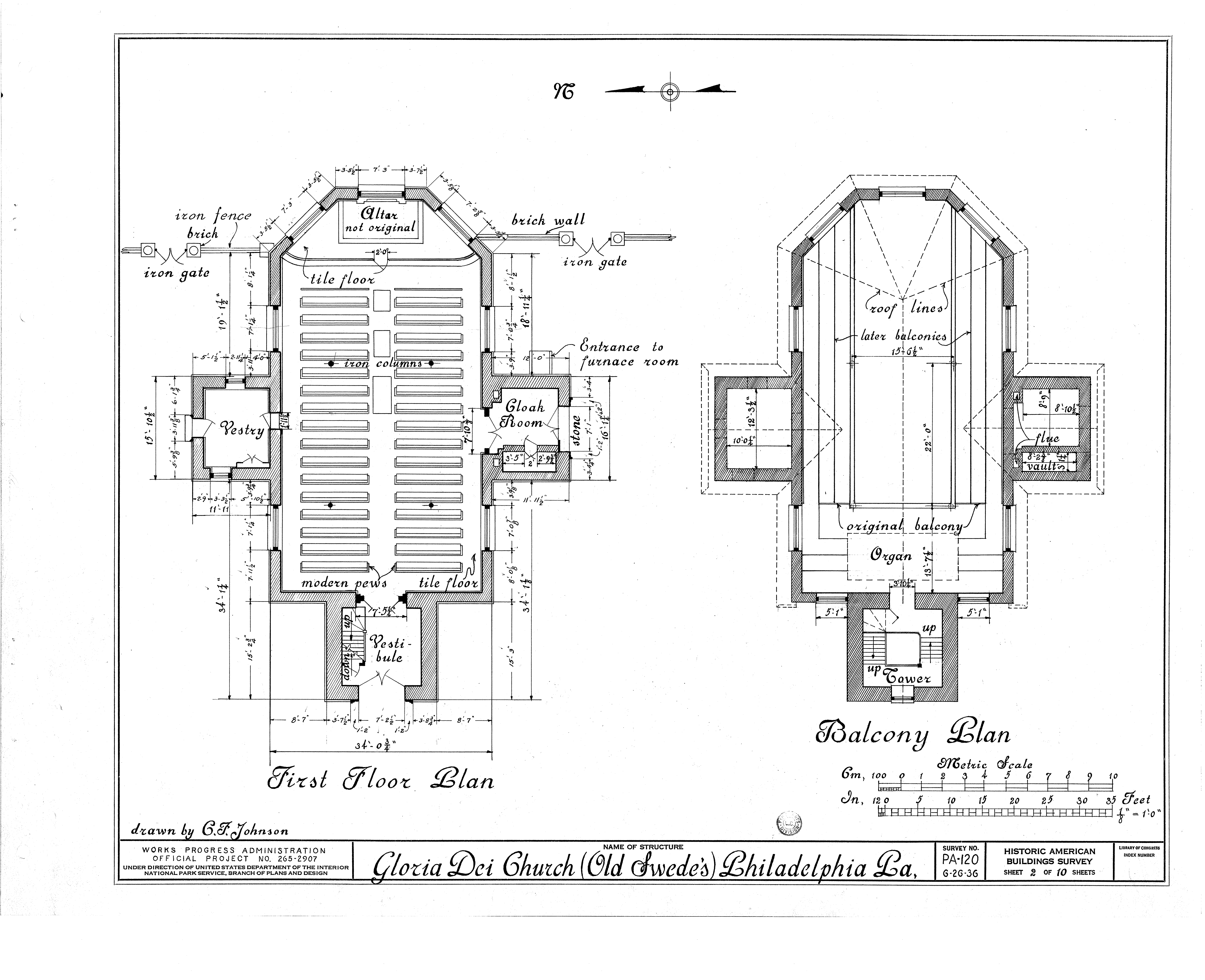
Floor plans of the first floor and balcony

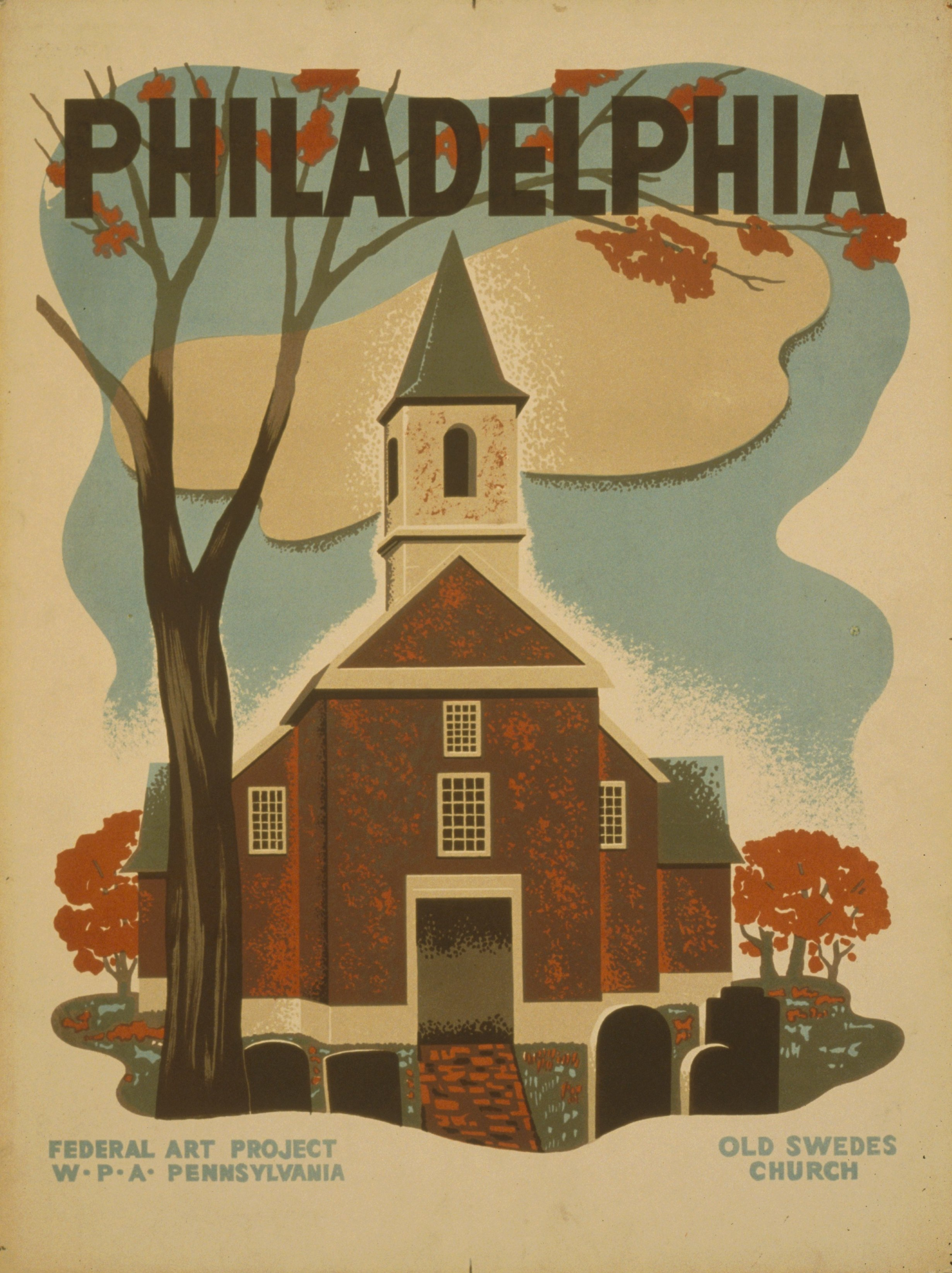
WPA poster promoting the church as a Philadelphia destination

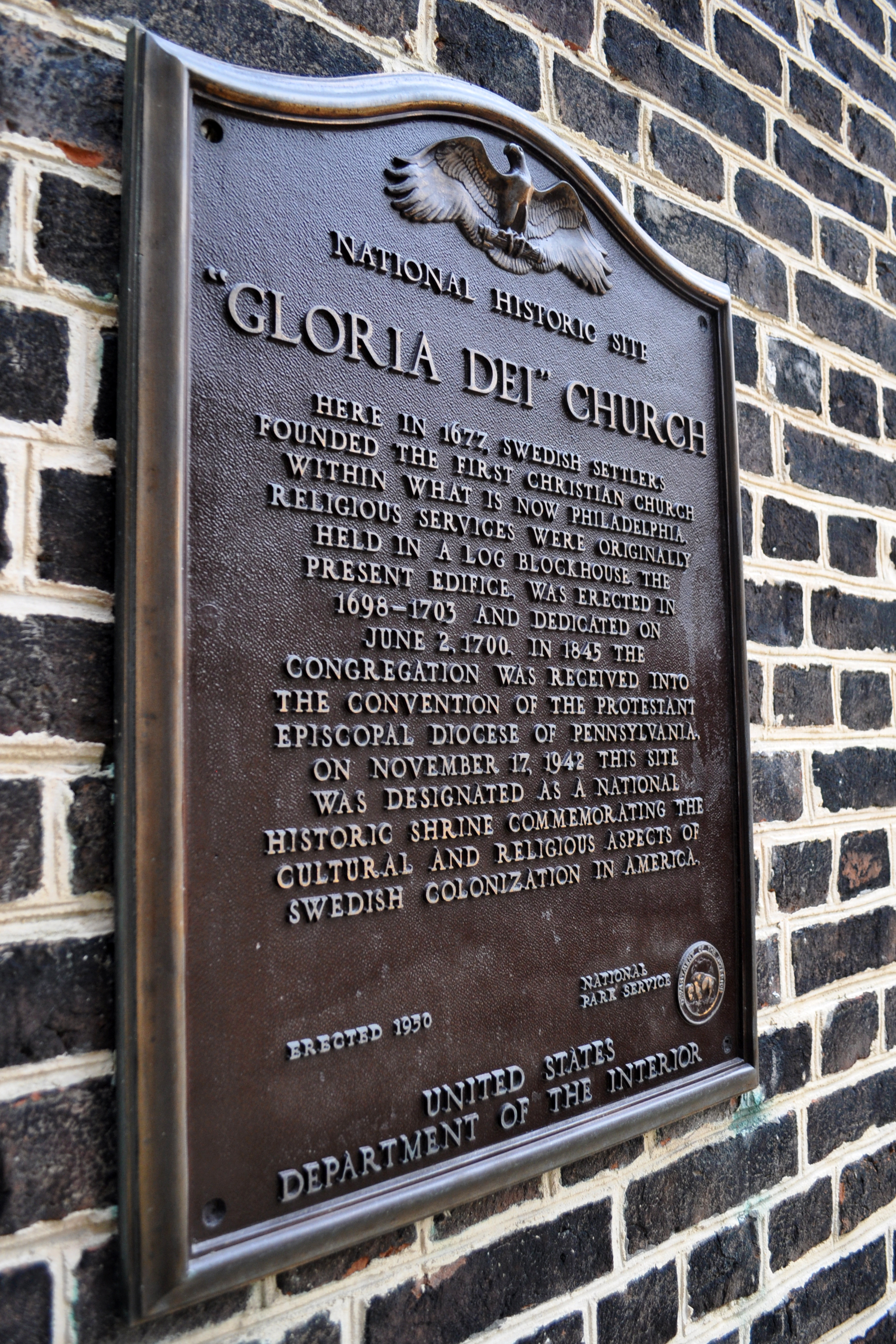
National Historic Site plaque on the church wall

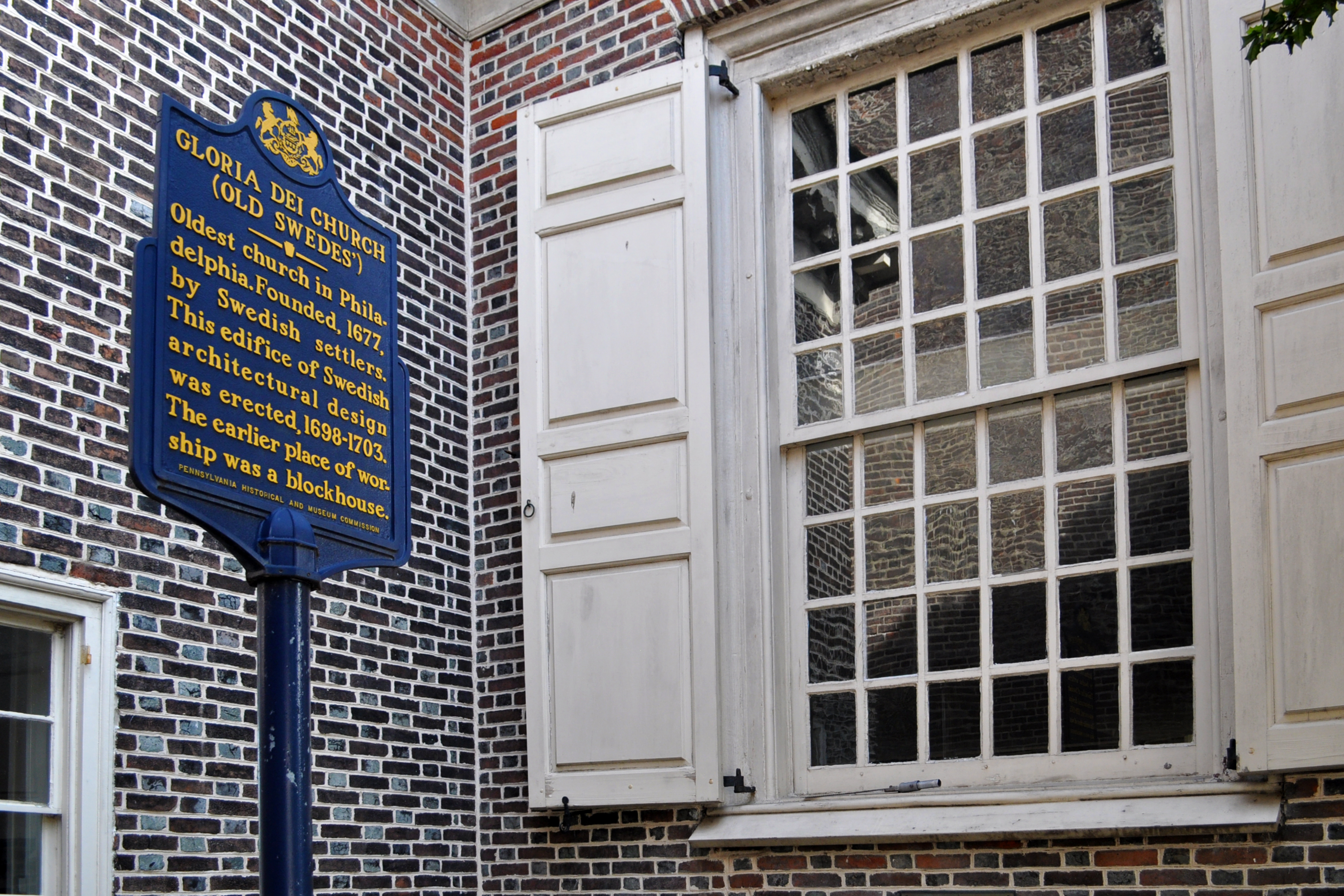
Pennsylvania Historical and Museum Commission marker

== See also ==
- List of the oldest buildings in Pennsylvania
- Laurentius Carels, Swedish American Lutheran pastor
- Holy Trinity Church (Old Swedes) in Wilmington, Delaware
