= Johan Dylander =

American-Swedish Immigrant Pastor

- Born: ~1709; Stockholm, Kingdom of Sweden
- Died: November 3, 1741 (aged 32); Wicacoa, Province of Pennsylvania, British America
- Education: Uppsala University
- Occupation: Minister
- Parent(s): Carl Dylander; Maria Wagner
- Religion: Lutheran
- Church: Church of Sweden
- Congregations served: Gloria Dei Church in Philadelphia, Pennsylvania (1737-1741)

Johan Dylander, born around 1709 in Stockholm, Sweden, died November 3, 1741, probably in Wicaco, Province of Pennsylvania, was pastor of Gloria Dei Church 1737–1741.

Johan Dylander was probably the son of the cashier in the Bank of Sweden, Carl Dylander. Very little is known about his early career. He became a student at Uppsala University in 1723 and was then curate in Börstil Parish and the town of Östhammar. On May 27, 1737, Dylander received a request to take the post of pastor in the Swedish congregation in Wicaco in Philadelphia, and on November 6, 1737, he was installed as pastor in the Gloria Dei Church.

When Dylander took office, the congregation was disintegrating and many of the younger people spoke better English than Swedish, but through his efforts it was held together. At first, Dylander was a very active minister and preached not only in the Swedish church but also in the German-Lutheran church in Germantown and in English churches. He translated Luther's Small Catechism into English and hoped to have the work printed in Sweden, something that never happened. However, Free Grace in Truth, an English translation of Johann Gerhard's 24th Latin meditation with notes by Dylander was published. It is a defense of the Lutheran doctrine of predestination against Calvinist thinking.

Dylander soon fell ill and was allowed to reduce his activities; he died after only four years of service in the parish. Rev. Dylander had married a daughter of Swedish merchant Peter Kock from Passayungh.
