= John C. Hunterson =

American Civil War Medal of Honor recipient

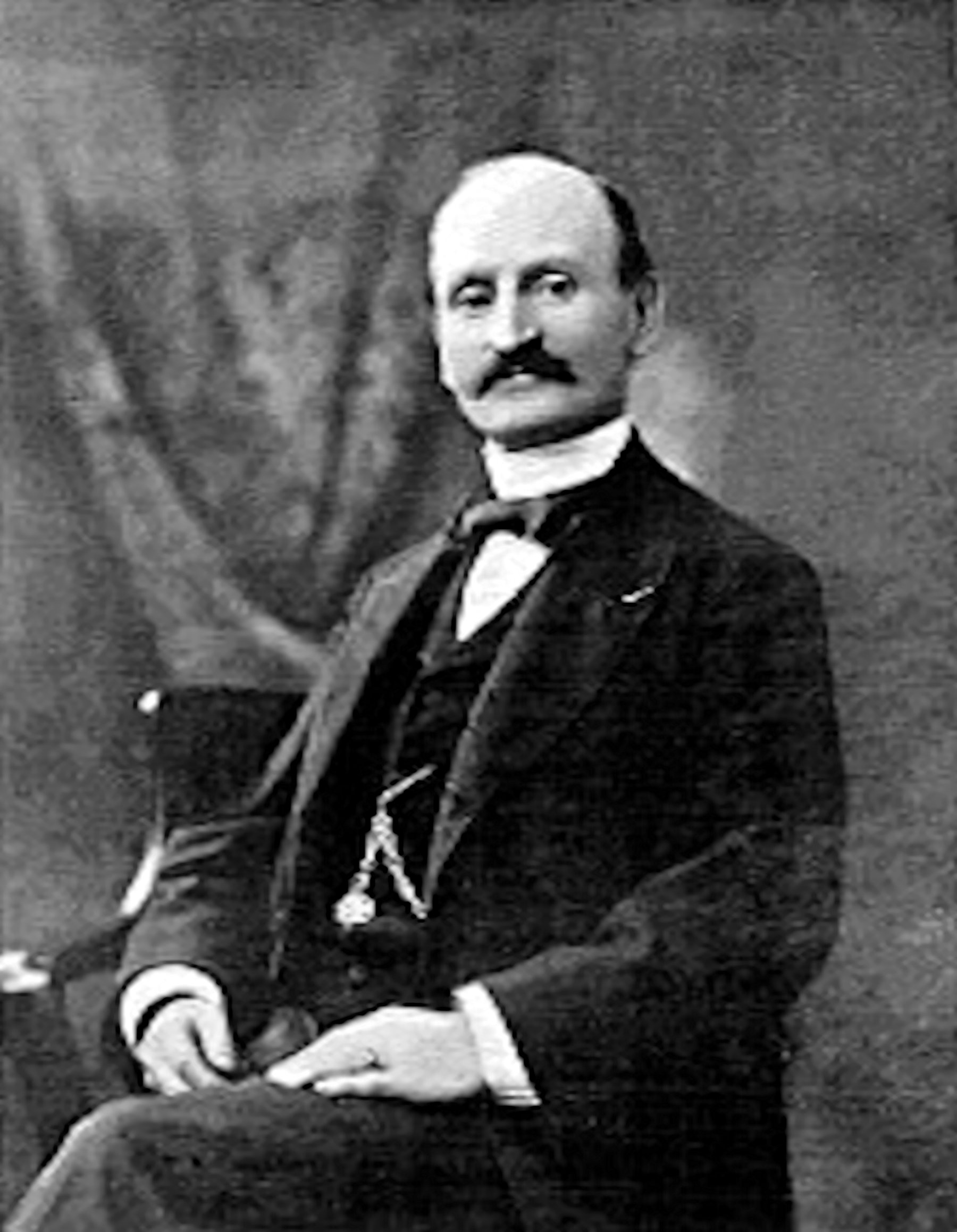
- Hunterson in c. 1880
- Born: August 4, 1841; Philadelphia, Pennsylvania
- Died: November 6, 1927 (aged 86)
- Burial place: Gloria Dei Church, Philadelphia, Pennsylvania
- Military career
- Allegiance: United States
- Branch: United States Army; Union Army
- Service years: 1861–1864
- Rank: Private
- Units: Company B, 3rd Pennsylvania Cavalry
- Conflicts: American Civil War
- Awards: Medal of Honor

John C. Hunterson (August 4, 1841 – November 6, 1927) was a Medal of Honor recipient in the American Civil War.

He mustered in with Company B of the 3rd Pennsylvania Cavalry as a Private on July 23, 1861. He mustered out with his company, August 24, 1864.

== Citation ==
Place and date: On the Peninsula, Va., 5 June 1862. Entered service at: Philadelphia, Pa. Birth: Philadelphia, Pa. Date of issue: 2 August 1897. Citation: While under fire, between the lines of the 2 armies, voluntarily gave up his own horse to an engineer officer whom he was accompanying on a reconnaissance and whose horse had been killed, thus enabling the officer to escape with valuable papers in his possession.

== See also ==
- List of Medal of Honor recipients
