= 65th Ohio Infantry Regiment =

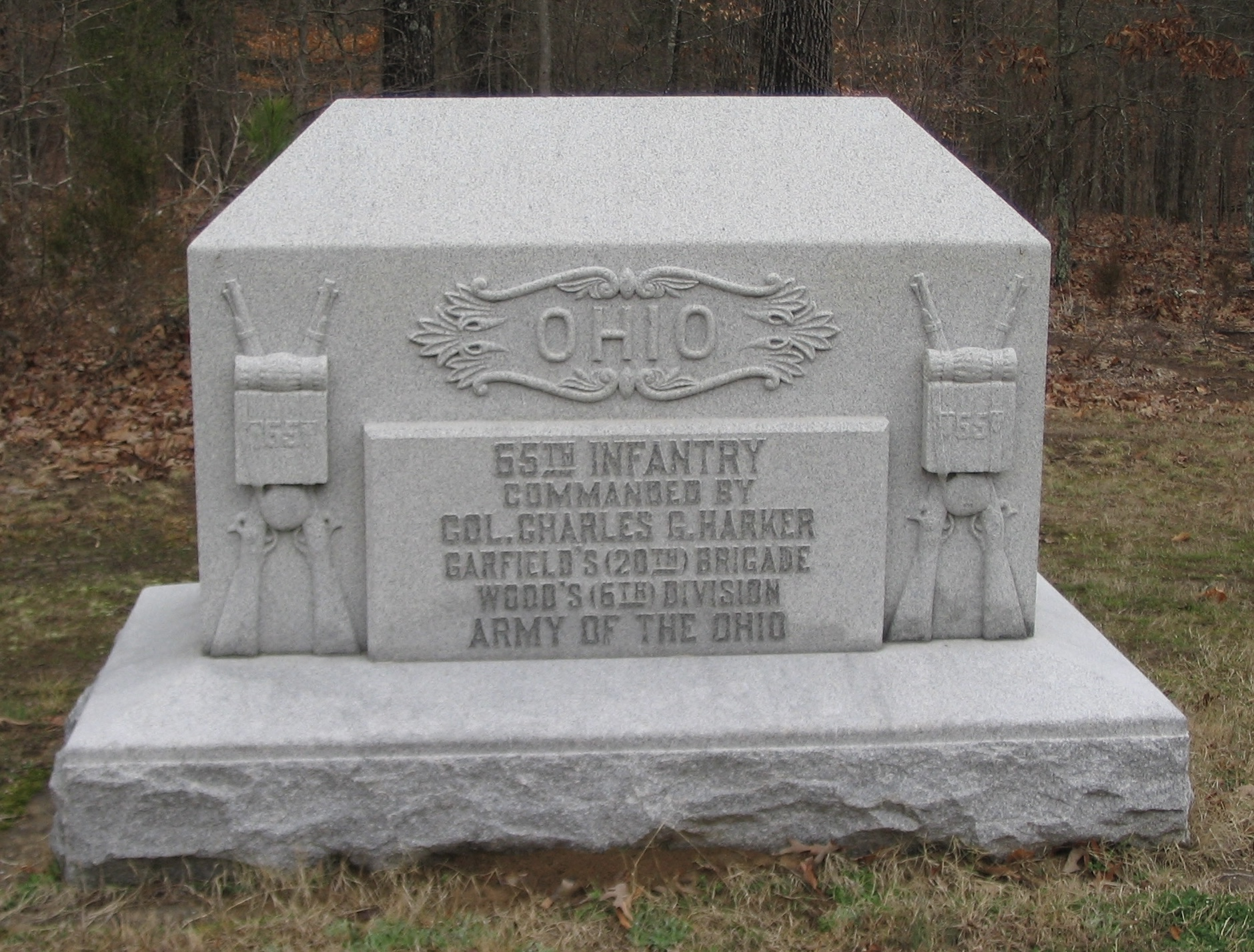
- 65th Ohio Infantry monument at Shiloh
- Active: October 3, 1861 - January 2, 1866
- Country: United States
- Allegiance: Union
- Branch: Union Army
- Role: Infantry
- Engagements: Western Campaign; Battle of Shiloh; Siege of Corinth; Confederate Heartland Offensive; Battle of Perryville; Stones River Campaign; Battle of Stones River; Tullahoma Campaign; Chattanooga campaign; Battle of Chickamauga; Battle of Missionary Ridge; Knoxville Campaign; Atlanta campaign; Battle of Resaca; Battle of Pickett's Mill; Battle of Kennesaw Mountain; Siege of Atlanta; Battle of Jonesboro; Franklin–Nashville Campaign; Battle of Spring Hill; Second Battle of Franklin; Battle of Nashville

Commanders
- Notable commanders: Col. Charles Garrison Harker

The 65th Ohio Infantry Regiment (or 65th OVI) was an infantry regiment in the Union Army during the American Civil War.

== Service ==
The 65th Ohio Infantry Regiment was organized at Camp Buckingham in Mansfield, Ohio, beginning October 3, 1861, and mustered in for three years service on November 14, 1861, under the command of Colonel Charles Garrison Harker, who was 23 years old at the time. The regiment was recruited in Ashland, Columbiana, Cuyahoga, Erie, Guernsey, Hancock, Knox, and Stark counties.

The regiment was attached to 20th Brigade, Army of the Ohio, to January 1862. 20th Brigade, 6th Division, Army of the Ohio, to September 1862. 20th Brigade, 6th Division, II Corps, Army of the Ohio, to November 1862. 3rd Brigade, 1st Division, Left Wing, XIV Corps, Army of the Cumberland, to January 1863. 3rd Brigade, 1st Division, XXI Corps, Army of the Cumberland, to October 1863. 3rd Brigade, 2nd Division, IV Corps, Army of the Cumberland, to June 1865. 2nd Brigade, 2nd Division, IV Corps, to August 1865. Department of Texas to December 1865.

The 65th Ohio Infantry mustered out of service at San Antonio, Texas, on November 30, 1865, and was discharged January 2, 1866.

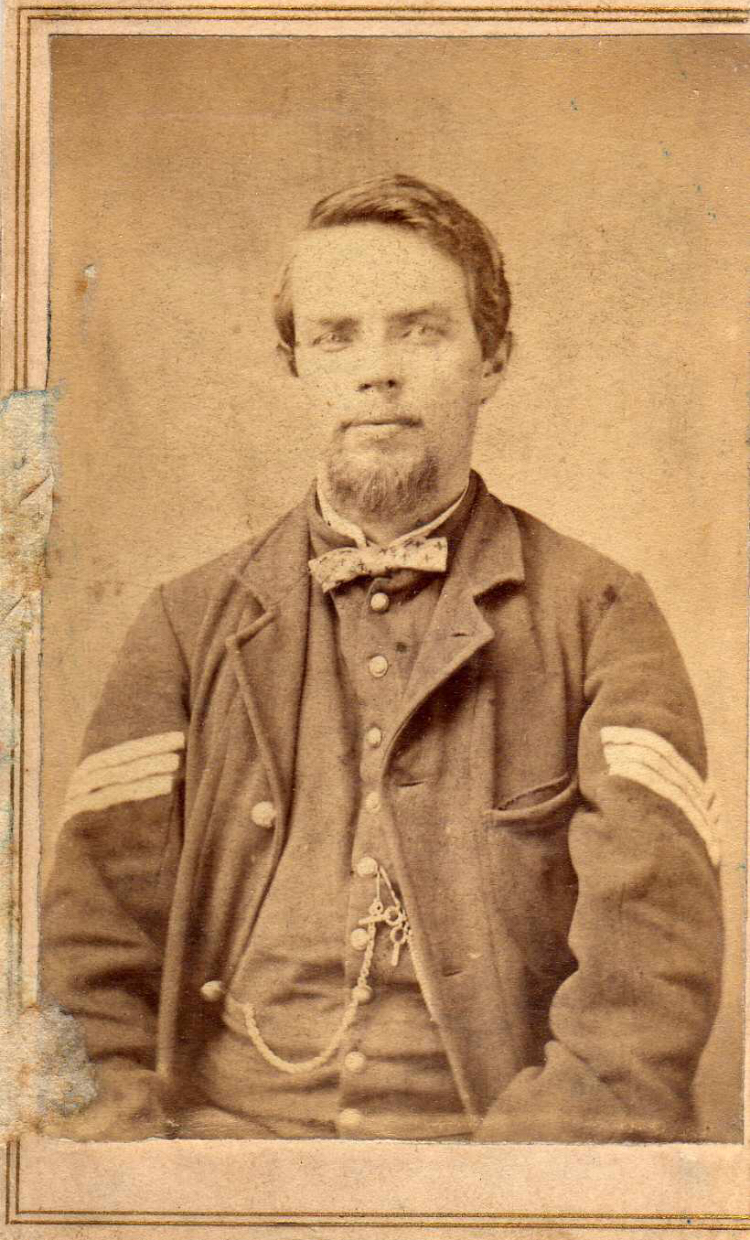
Sgt. William Harris of Company K, who was killed in action at Resaca.

== Detailed service ==
Moved to Louisville, Ky., December 18; thence to Bardstown and to Hall's Gap, Ky., January 13, 1862. March to Munfordville, Ky., thence to Nashville, Tenn., February 7-March 13, and to Savannah, Tenn., March 29-April 6. Battle of Shiloh, Tenn., April 6–7. Advance on and siege of Corinth, Miss., April 29-May 30. Pursuit to Booneville June 1–12. Duty along Memphis & Charleston Railroad in Alabama and at Bridgeport, Ala., until August 21, March to Louisville, Ky., in pursuit of Bragg August 21-September 26. Pursuit of Bragg into Kentucky October 1–15. Battle of Perryville, Ky., October 8 (reserve). March to Nashville, Tenn., October 15-November 7, and duty there until December 26. Advance on Murfreesboro, Tenn., December 26–30. Battle of Stones River December 30–31, 1862 and January 1–3, 1863. Duty at Murfreesboro until June. Reconnaissance to Nolensville and Versailles January 13–15. Tullahoma Campaign June 23-July 7. Occupation of middle Tennessee until August 16. Passage of the Cumberland Mountains and Tennessee River and Chickamauga Campaign August 16-September 22. Reconnaissance toward Chattanooga September 7. Lookout Valley September 7–8. Occupation of Chattanooga September 9. Lee and Gordon's Mills September 11–13. Battle of Chickamauga September 19–20. Siege of Chattanooga, September 24-November 23. Chattanooga-Ringgold Campaign November 23–27. Orchard Knob November 23–24. Missionary Ridge November 25. Pursuit to Graysville November 26–27. March to relief of Knoxville, November 28-December 8. Operations in eastern Tennessee until April 1864. Atlanta Campaign May 1 to September 8. Demonstrations on Rocky Face Ridge and Dalton May 8–13. Buzzard's Roost Gap or Mill Springs May 8–9. Battle of Resaca May 14–15. Near Calhoun May 16. Adairsville May 17. Near Kingston May 18–19. Near Cassville May 19. Advance on Dallas May 22–25. Operations on line of Pumpkin Vine Creek and battles about Dallas, New Hope Church and Allatoona Hills May 25-June 5. Operations about Marietta and against Kennesaw Mountain June 10-July 2. Pine Hill June 11–14. Lost Mountain June 15–17. Assault on Kennesaw June 27. Ruff's Station, Smyrna Camp Ground, July 4. Chattahoochie River July 5–17. Buckhead, Nancy's Creek, July 18. Peachtree Creek July 19–20. Siege of Atlanta July 22-August 25. Flank movement on Jonesboro August 25–30. Battle of Jonesboro August 31-September 1. Lovejoy's Station September 2–6. Operations in northern Georgia and northern Alabama against Hood October 4–26. Nashville Campaign November–December. Columbia, Duck River, November 24–27. Spring Hill November 29. Battle of Franklin November 30. Battle of Nashville December 15–16. Pursuit of Hood to the Tennessee River December 17–28. Moved to Huntsville, Ala., and duty there until March 1865. Operations in eastern Tennessee March 15-April 22. At Nashville, Tenn., until June. Moved to New Orleans, La., June 16; thence to Texas and duty at San Antonio until December.

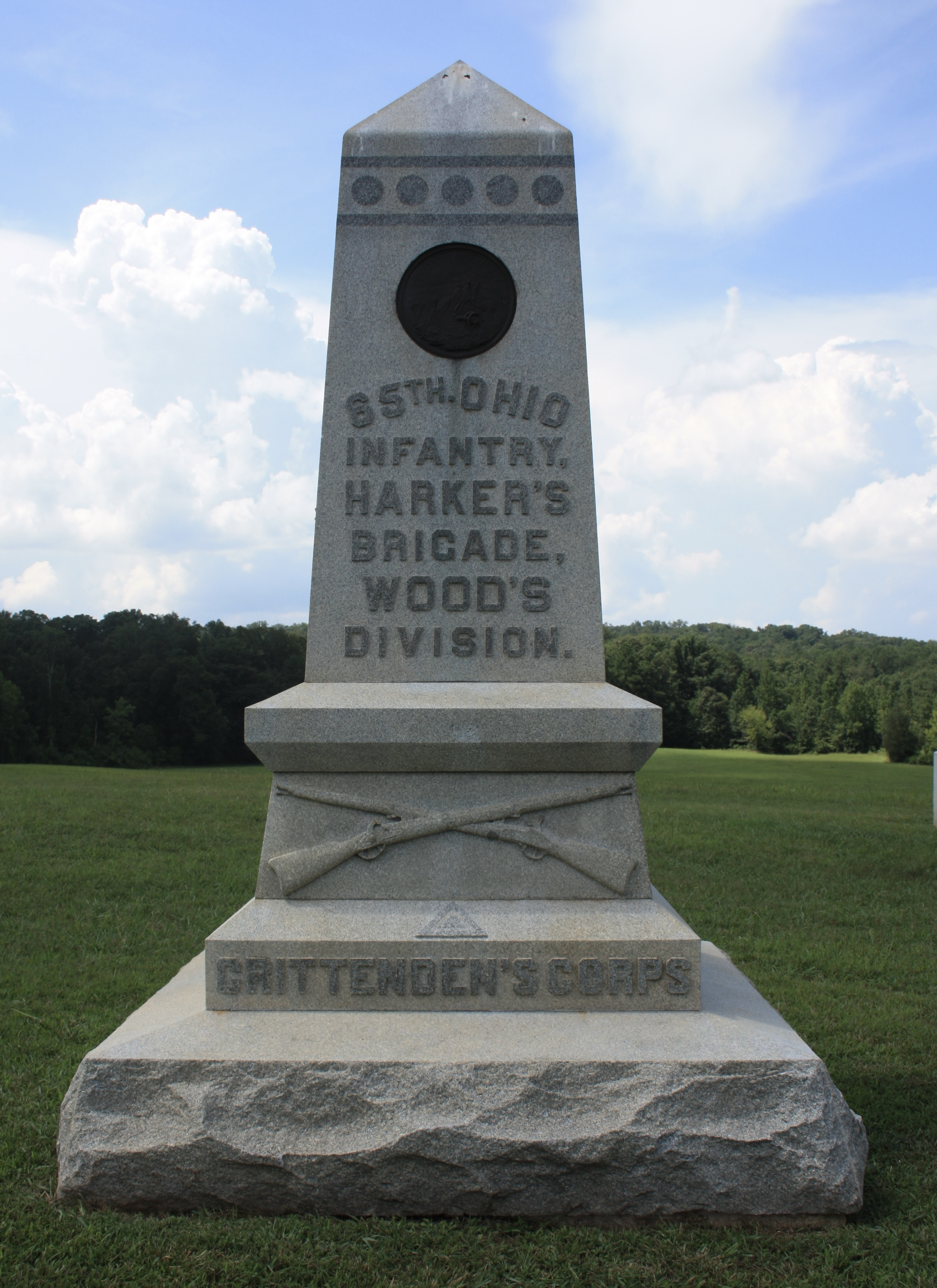
65th Ohio Infantry monument at Chickamauga.

== Casualties ==
The regiment lost a total of 257 men during service; 8 officers and 114 enlisted men killed or mortally wounded, 6 officers and 129 enlisted men died of disease.

== Commanders ==
- Colonel Charles Garrison Harker - promoted to brigade command and later brigadier general September 20, 1863; killed in action at Kennesaw Mountain
- Lieutenant Colonel William Young - commanded at the battle of Perryville
- Lieutenant Colonel Alexander Cassil - commanded at the battle of Stones River
- Lieutenant Colonel Horatio Nelson Whitbeck - commanded at the battles of Stones River and Chickamauga
- Major Samuel C. Brown - commanded at the battle of Chickamauga
- Major Orlow Smith - commanded at the battle of Nashville
- Captain Thomas Powell - commanded at the battle of Chickamauga

== See also ==
- List of Ohio Civil War units
- Battle of Shiloh
- Battle of Perryville
- Battle of Stones River
- Battle of Chickamauga
- Siege of Chattanooga
- Battle of Missionary Ridge
- Atlanta campaign
- Siege of Atlanta
- Battle of Spring Hill
- Second Battle of Franklin
- Battle of Nashville
