= Andreas Rudman =

- Born: November 3, 1668; Gävle, Kingdom of Sweden
- Died: September 8, 1708 (aged 39); Philadelphia, Province of Pennsylvania, British America
- Education: Uppsala University
- Occupation: Minister
- Parent(s): Johan Augustison Rudolph; Magdalena Nilsdotter
- Religion: Lutheran
- Church: Church of Sweden
- Congregations served: Gloria Dei Church in Philadelphia, Pennsylvania (1668-1708)

Andreas Rudman (November 3, 1668 – September 17, 1708) was a pioneer Swedish-American Lutheran minister. He was pastor of Gloria Dei (Old Swedes') Church in Philadelphia.

== Background ==
Anders Rudman was born in Gävle, Gästrikland Province, Sweden, the son of Johan Augustison Rudolph and Magdalena Nilsdotter. He was attended the University of Uppsala and was ordained into the Church of Sweden. Rudman supervised the construction of Gloria Dei Church at Wicaco, Pennsylvania beginning in 1698. The church was dedicated in 1700. Rudman was succeeded as pastor at Gloria Dei by Anders Sandel in 1702. Rudman accepted a call to pastor at a Dutch Lutheran congregation in New York City and later served two church congregations near Philadelphia. Rudman died in 1708 and was buried in Gloria Dei.

== Other sources ==
- Hotchkin, Rev. S. F. Early Clergy of Pennsylvania and Delaware (Philadelphia, PA: P. W. Ziegler & Co. 1890)
