= Swedesboro, New Jersey =

Borough in Gloucester County, New Jersey, US

- Borough
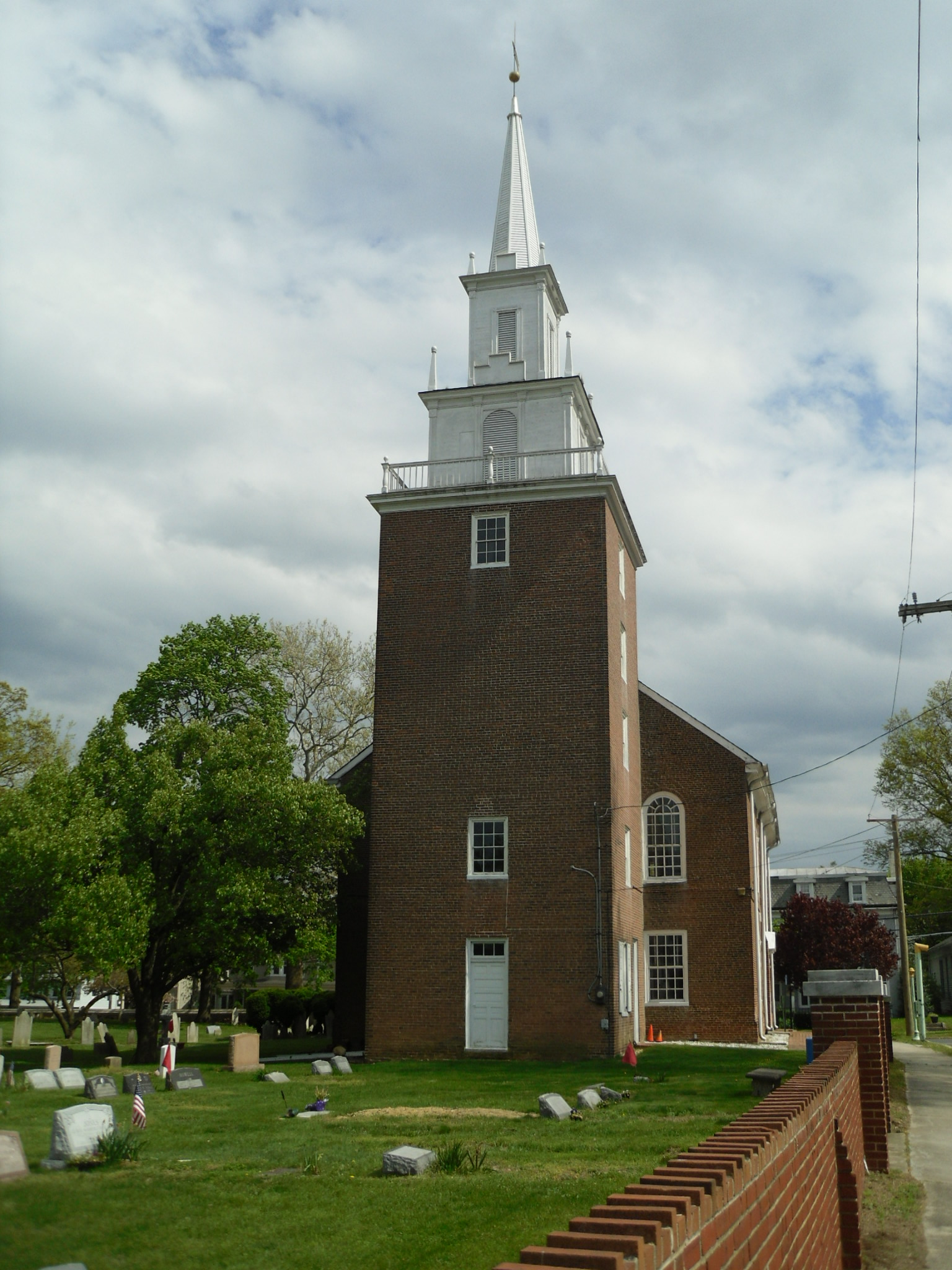
- Trinity Church in Swedesboro

- Seal

- Map of Swedesboro highlighted within Gloucester County. Inset: Location of Gloucester County in New Jersey.

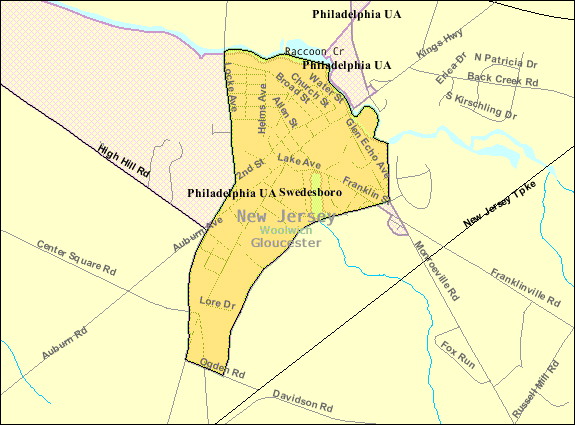
- Census Bureau map of Swedesboro, New Jersey

- Location in Gloucester County Location in New Jersey Location in the United States
- Coordinates: 39.745884°N 75.310947°W
- Country: United States
- State: New Jersey
- County: Gloucester
- Incorporated: April 9, 1902

Government
  - Type: Borough
  - Body: Borough Council
  - Mayor: Thomas W. Fromm (D, term ends December 31, 2027)
  - Municipal clerk: Jena Dolbow

Area
  - Total: 0.77 sq mi (1.99 km^{2})
  - Land: 0.73 sq mi (1.89 km^{2})
  - Water: 0.035 sq mi (0.09 km^{2}) 4.55%
  - Rank: 523rd of 565 in state 24th of 24 in county
- Elevation: 46 ft (14 m)

Population (2020)
  - Total: 2,711
  - Estimate (2023): 2,741
  - Rank: 459th of 565 in state 22nd of 24 in county
  - Density: 3,707.4/sq mi (1,431.4/km^{2})
  - Rank: 181st of 565 in state 4th of 24 in county
- Time zone: UTC−05:00 (Eastern (EST))
  - Summer (DST): UTC−04:00 (Eastern (EDT))
- ZIP Code: 08085
- Area code: 856 Exchanges: 241, 467
- FIPS code: 3401571850
- GNIS feature ID: 0885415
- Website: www.historicswedesboro.com

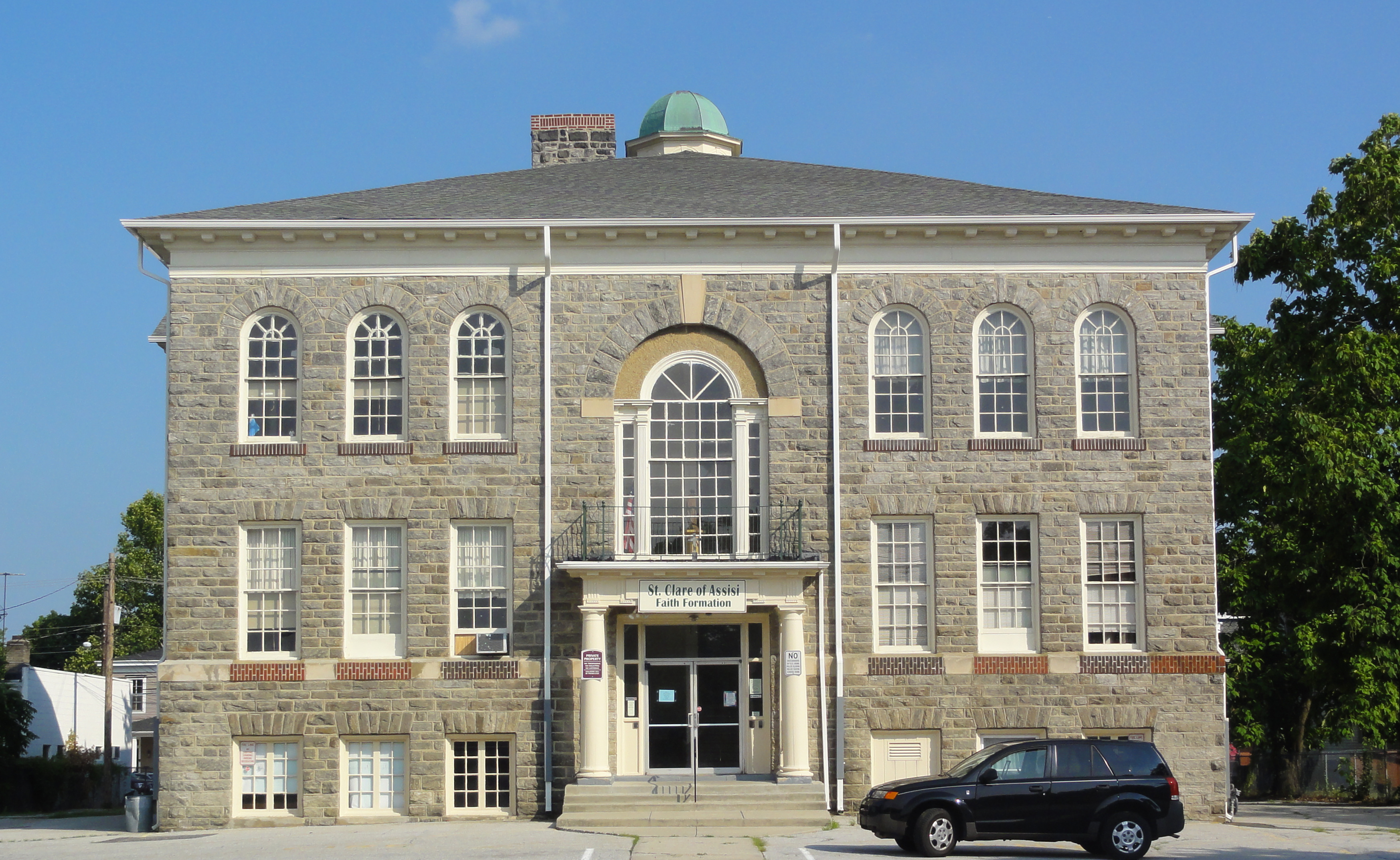
Swedesboro Grammar School

Swedesboro is a borough within Gloucester County in the U.S. state of New Jersey, within the Philadelphia metropolitan area. As of the 2020 United States census, the borough's population was 2,711, its highest decennial count ever and an increase of 127 (+4.9%) from the 2,584 recorded at the 2010 census, which in turn reflected an increase of 529 (+25.7%) from the 2,055 counted in the 2000 census. Swedesboro and surrounding Gloucester County constitute part of South Jersey.

Swedesboro was formed as a borough by an act of the New Jersey Legislature on April 9, 1902, from portions of Woolwich Township. The borough was named for its early settlers from Sweden.

Swedesboro has been recognized by the National Arbor Day Foundation as a Tree City USA since 2000.

== History ==
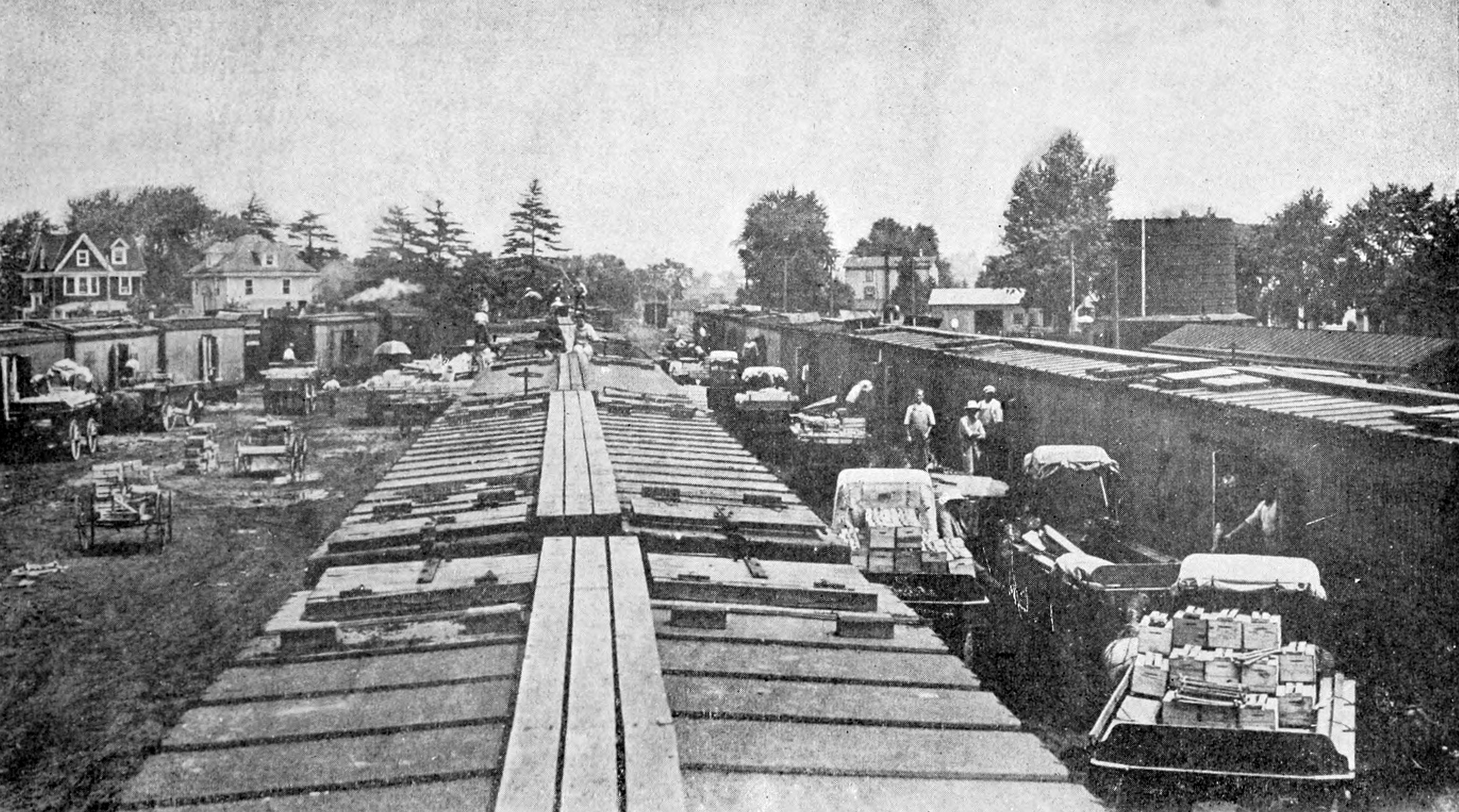
Tomato shipping in Swedesboro, 1912

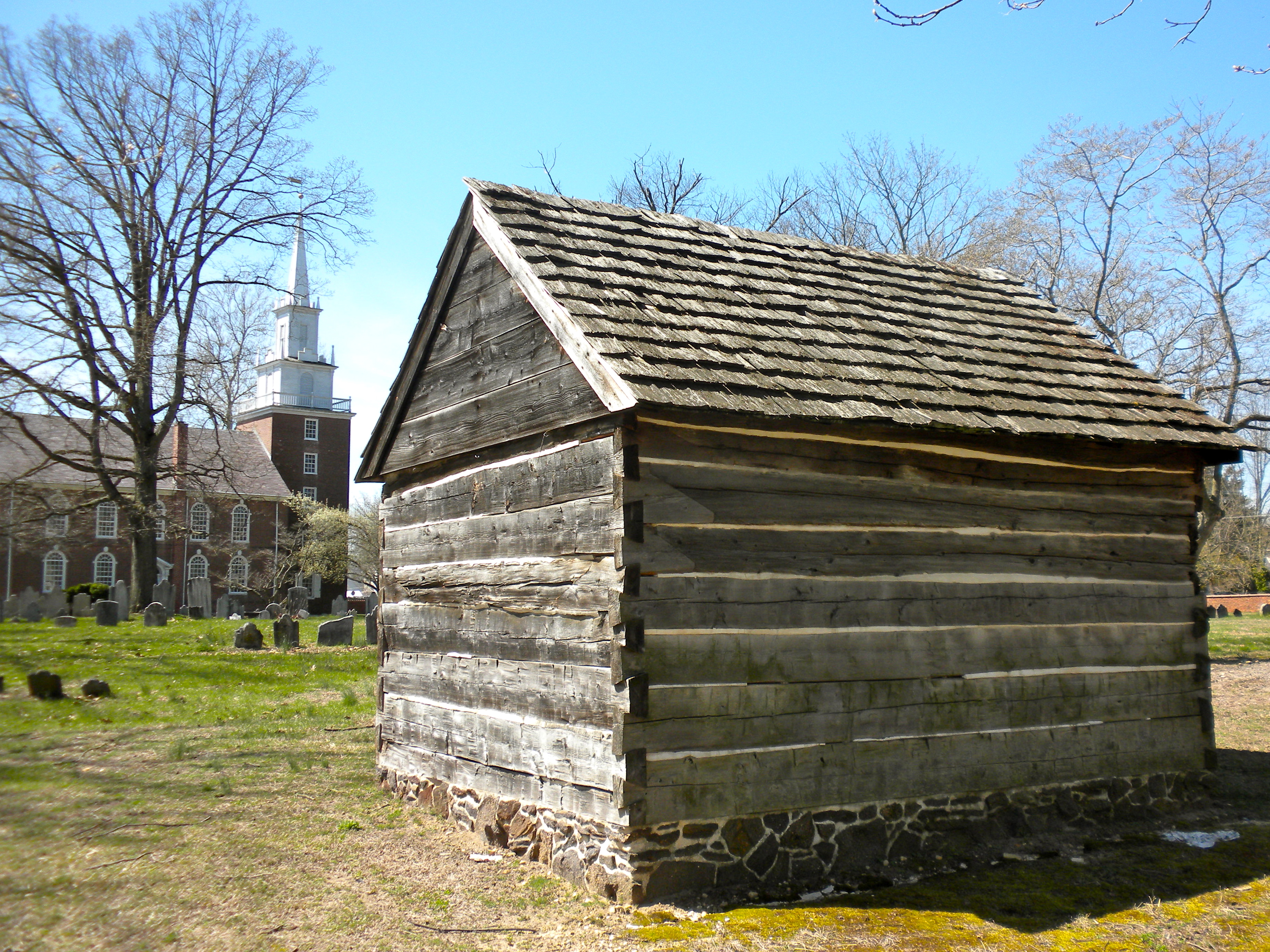
C. A. Nothnagle Log House, c. 1700

Originally populated by the Lenape Native Americans, Swedesboro was settled as part of New Sweden around 1650. The Swedes and Finns were fishermen, hunters and farmers.

Swedesboro, initially named Sveaborg by the Swedish settlers, along with Bridgeport (Nya Stockholm) and Finns Point (Varkens Kill), was one of only three settlements established in New Jersey as a part of the New Sweden colony. The oldest extant log cabin in the U.S., C. A. Nothnagle Log House (c. 1640) was built by Antti Niilonpoika (Anthony Neilson/Nelson) in Swedesboro. It is listed on the National Register of Historic Places, as is Trinity Episcopal "Old Swedes" Church, which was established as a Swedish Lutheran Church in 1703; the present building dates to 1784.

As a result of the Second Northern War, New Sweden passed into Dutch hands in 1655. In 1667, the English subsequently annexed the region along the Delaware River after the Second Anglo-Dutch War. The English Colonial government needed a road between the communities of Burlington and Salem and built the Kings Highway in 1691, which opened the southern portion of Gloucester County to more settlers, who were drawn to the area by the fertile sandy soil, prime farmland and vast tracts of oak, birch, maple and pine trees. Originally, the community was called Raccoon until it was changed to Swedesboro in 1765.

Through the late 1800s, Raccoon Creek, which runs for 22.6 miles (36.4 km), was a navigable water route that was naturally deep enough to transport wood and farm produce to Philadelphia via the Delaware River. The creek was named for the Narraticon Native Americans who lived in the area and gave their name as Raccoon to the first European settlement. The Van Leer Log Cabin was once used as a trading post with Native Americans and later a station for the Underground Railroad to help slaves escape to free negro communities.

Trinity Church Cemetery is the burial place of Governor of New Jersey Charles C. Stratton, Congressman Benjamin Franklin Howey, and other notables.

Carl XVI Gustaf, King of Sweden, visited the borough as part of a 1976 tour of the United States.

== Geography ==
According to the U.S. Census Bureau, the borough had a total area of 0.77 square miles (1.99 km^{2}), including 0.73 square miles (1.89 km^{2}) of land and 0.04 square miles (0.09 km^{2}) of water (4.55%).

Unincorporated communities, localities, and places located partially or completely within the township include Ivyside. Swedesboro is an independent municipality surrounded on all sides by Woolwich Township, making it one of only 21 "doughnut towns" in the state, where one municipality entirely surrounds another.

== Demographics ==
Historical population
| Census | Pop. | Note | %± |
|---|---|---|---|
| 1880 | 894 | | — |
| 1890 | 2,035 | | 127.6% |
| 1910 | 1,477 | | — |
| 1920 | 1,838 | | 24.4% |
| 1930 | 2,123 | | 15.5% |
| 1940 | 2,268 | | 6.8% |
| 1950 | 2,459 | | 8.4% |
| 1960 | 2,449 | | −0.4% |
| 1970 | 2,287 | | −6.6% |
| 1980 | 2,031 | | −11.2% |
| 1990 | 2,024 | | −0.3% |
| 2000 | 2,055 | | 1.5% |
| 2010 | 2,584 | | 25.7% |
| 2020 | 2,711 | | 4.9% |
| 2023 (est.) | 2,741 | ▲ | 1.1% |
Population sources: 1880–1890 1910–2000; 1910–1920 1910; 1910–1930 1940–2000; 2000 2010 2020

=== 2020 census ===
As of the 2020 census, Swedesboro had a population of 2,711. The median age was 34.7 years. 27.3% of residents were under the age of 18 and 11.3% of residents were 65 years of age or older. For every 100 females there were 92.3 males, and for every 100 females age 18 and over there were 91.0 males age 18 and over.

100.0% of residents lived in urban areas, while 0.0% lived in rural areas.

There were 953 households in Swedesboro, of which 44.8% had children under the age of 18 living in them. Of all households, 43.2% were married-couple households, 17.3% were households with a male householder and no spouse or partner present, and 31.8% were households with a female householder and no spouse or partner present. About 22.8% of all households were made up of individuals and 8.6% had someone living alone who was 65 years of age or older.

There were 1,022 housing units, of which 6.8% were vacant. The homeowner vacancy rate was 0.8% and the rental vacancy rate was 8.8%.

Racial composition as of the 2020 census
| Race | Number | Percent |
|---|---|---|
| White | 1,682 | 62.0% |
| Black or African American | 391 | 14.4% |
| American Indian and Alaska Native | 24 | 0.9% |
| Asian | 64 | 2.4% |
| Native Hawaiian and Other Pacific Islander | 0 | 0.0% |
| Some other race | 271 | 10.0% |
| Two or more races | 279 | 10.3% |
| Hispanic or Latino (of any race) | 478 | 17.6% |

=== 2010 census ===
The 2010 United States census counted 2,584 people, 938 households, and 645 families in the borough. The population density was 3,568.4 inhabitants per square mile (1,377.8/km^{2}). There were 1,004 housing units at an average density of 1,386.5 per square mile (535.3/km^{2}). The racial makeup was 69.81% (1,804) White, 15.02% (388) Black or African American, 0.58% (15) Native American, 1.35% (35) Asian, 0.08% (2) Pacific Islander, 9.48% (245) from other races, and 3.68% (95) from two or more races. Hispanic or Latino of any race were 17.07% (441) of the population.

Of the 938 households, 36.5% had children under the age of 18; 45.2% were married couples living together; 17.0% had a female householder with no husband present and 31.2% were non-families. Of all households, 24.8% were made up of individuals and 9.7% had someone living alone who was 65 years of age or older. The average household size was 2.75 and the average family size was 3.27.

27.4% of the population were under the age of 18, 8.7% from 18 to 24, 32.5% from 25 to 44, 21.3% from 45 to 64, and 10.0% who were 65 years of age or older. The median age was 32.7 years. For every 100 females, the population had 98.2 males. For every 100 females ages 18 and older there were 95.1 males.

The Census Bureau's 2006–2010 American Community Survey showed that (in 2010 inflation-adjusted dollars) median household income was $65,085 (with a margin of error of +/− $9,111) and the median family income was $70,050 (+/− $7,451). Males had a median income of $47,974 (+/− $4,268) versus $43,721 (+/− $3,157) for females. The per capita income for the borough was $24,623 (+/− $2,395). About 9.1% of families and 11.4% of the population were below the poverty line, including 15.5% of those under age 18 and 18.8% of those age 65 or over.

=== 2000 census ===
As of the 2000 census, there were 2,055 people, 771 households, and 528 families residing in the borough. The population density was 2,830.8 inhabitants per square mile (1,093.0/km^{2}). There were 860 housing units at an average density of 1,184.7 per square mile (457.4/km^{2}). The racial makeup of the borough was 76.93% White, 16.50% African American, 0.05% Native American, 0.34% Asian, 3.36% from other races, and 2.82% from two or more races. Hispanic or Latino of any race were 8.52% of the population.

There were 771 households, out of which 34.8% had children under the age of 18 living with them, 46.3% were married couples living together, 16.5% had a female householder with no husband present, and 31.4% were non-families. 25.9% of all households were made up of individuals, and 12.3% had someone living alone who was 65 years of age or older. The average household size was 2.66 and the average family size was 3.22.

In the borough, the population was spread out, with 27.4% under the age of 18, 8.0% from 18 to 24, 32.0% from 25 to 44, 20.0% from 45 to 64, and 12.6% who were 65 years of age or older. The median age was 36 years. For every 100 females, there were 96.5 males. For every 100 females age 18 and over, there were 88.6 males.

The median income for a household in the borough was $49,286, and the median income for a family was $58,721. Males had a median income of $41,346 versus $33,125 for females. The per capita income for the borough was $20,857. About 7.8% of families and 9.7% of the population were below the poverty line, including 12.4% of those under age 18 and 8.5% of those age 65 or over.

== Government ==
=== Local government ===
Swedesboro is governed under the borough form of New Jersey municipal government, which is used in 218 of 564 municipalities statewide, making it the most common form of government in New Jersey. The governing body is composed of a mayor and a borough council, with all positions elected at-large on a partisan basis as part of the November general election. A mayor is elected directly by the voters to a four-year term of office. The borough council includes six members elected to serve three-year terms on a staggered basis, with two seats coming up for election each year in a three-year cycle. The borough form of government used by Swedesboro is a "weak mayor / strong council" government in which council members act as the legislative body with the mayor presiding at meetings and voting only in the event of a tie. The mayor can veto ordinances subject to an override by a two-thirds majority vote of the council. The mayor makes committee and liaison assignments for council members, and most appointments are made by the mayor with the advice and consent of the council.

As of 2025, the mayor of Swedesboro is Democrat Thomas W. Fromm, whose term of office ends December 31, 2027. The Swedesboro Borough Council consists of Council President Salvatore "Sam" Casella (R, 2027), Shaun Booker (D, 2027), David Flaherty (D, 2026), Joanna Gahrs (R, 2026), Diane F. Hale (D, 2025) and George J. Weeks (D, 2025).

=== Federal, state and county representation ===
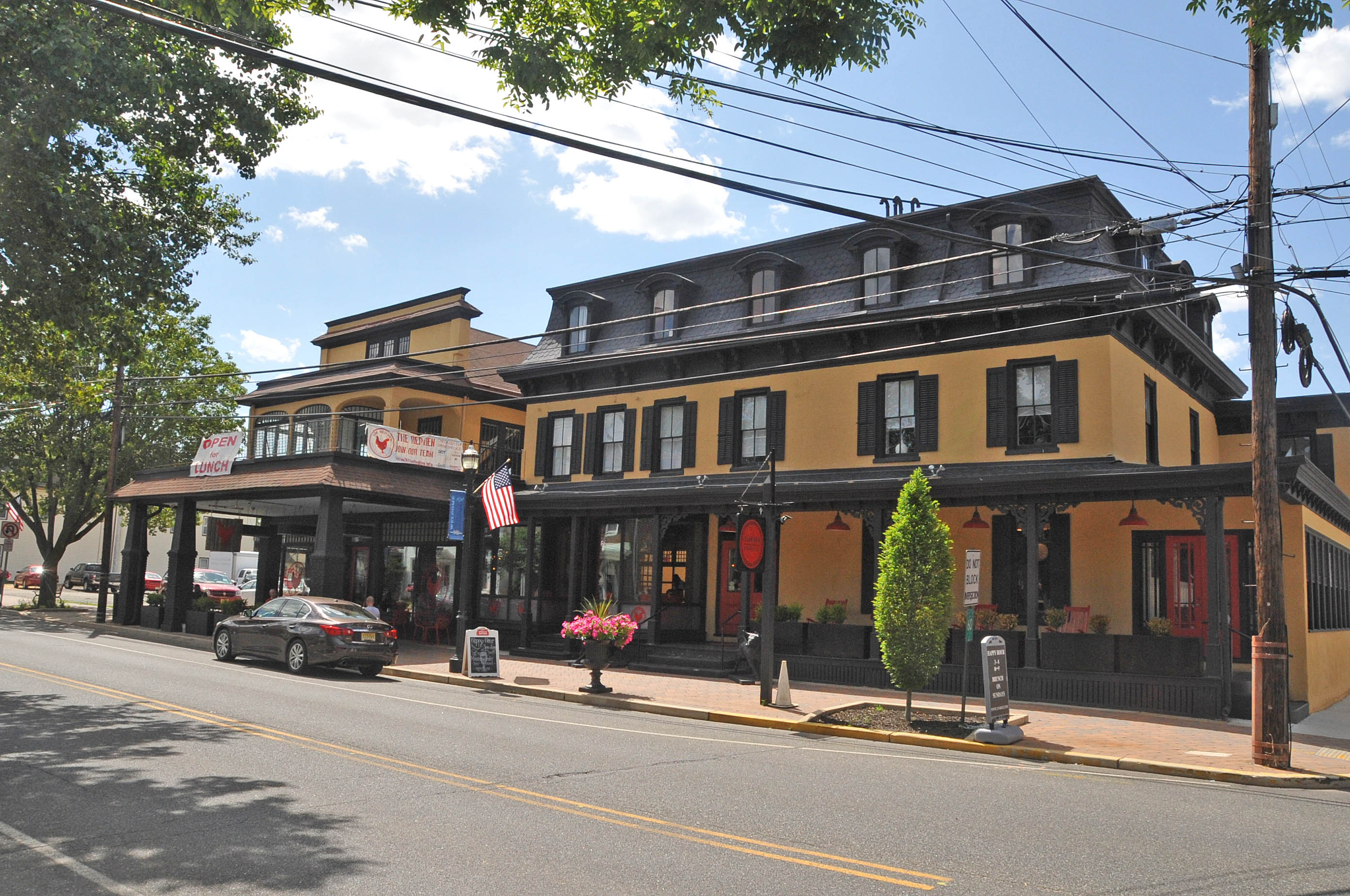
Swede's Inn in Swedesboro, November 2007

Swedesboro is located in the 2nd Congressional District and is part of New Jersey's 3rd state legislative district.

For the 119th United States Congress, New Jersey's 2nd congressional district is represented by Jeff Van Drew (R, Dennis Township). New Jersey is represented in the United States Senate by Democrats Cory Booker (Newark, term ends 2027) and Andy Kim (Moorestown, term ends 2031).

For the 2026–2027 session, the 3rd legislative district of the New Jersey Legislature is represented in the State Senate by John Burzichelli (D, Paulsboro) and in the General Assembly by David Bailey (D, Woodstown) and Heather Simmons (D, Glassboro).

Gloucester County is governed by a board of county commissioners, whose seven members are elected at-large to three-year terms of office on a staggered basis in partisan elections, with either two or three seats coming up for election each year. At a reorganization meeting held each January, the Board selects a Director and a Deputy Director from among its members. As of 2025, Gloucester County's Commissioners are:

Director Frank J. DiMarco (D, Deptford Township, 2025), Matt Weng (D, Pitman, 2026), Joann Gattinelli (D, Washington Township, 2026), Nicholas DeSilvio (R, Franklin Township, 2027), Denice DiCarlo (D, West Deptford Township, 2025) Deputy Director Jim Jefferson (D, Woodbury, 2026) and Christopher Konawel Jr. (R, Glassboro, 2027).

Gloucester County's constitutional officers are: Clerk James N. Hogan (D, Franklin Township; 2027), Sheriff Carmel Morina (D, Greenwich Township; 2027) and Surrogate Giuseppe "Joe" Chila (D, Woolwich Township; 2028).

=== Politics ===
United States presidential election results for Swedesboro 2024 2020 2016 2012 2008 2004
| Year | Republican | | Democratic | | Third party(ies) | |
| Year | No. | % | No. | % | No. | % |
|---|---|---|---|---|---|---|
| 2024 | 498 | 41.53% | 668 | 55.71% | 33 | 2.75% |
| 2020 | 535 | 41.09% | 740 | 56.84% | 27 | 2.07% |
| 2016 | 440 | 43.10% | 532 | 52.11% | 49 | 4.80% |
| 2012 | 417 | 39.27% | 632 | 59.51% | 13 | 1.22% |
| 2008 | 402 | 38.62% | 625 | 60.04% | 14 | 1.34% |
| 2004 | 448 | 49.89% | 445 | 49.55% | 5 | 0.56% |

As of March 2011, there were a total of 1,535 registered voters in Swedesboro, of which 471 (30.7%) were registered as Democrats, 311 (20.3%) were registered as Republicans and 751 (48.9%) were registered as Unaffiliated. There were 2 voters registered as either Libertarians or Greens.

Gubernatorial election results for Swedesboro
| Year | Republican | | Democratic | | Third party(ies) | |
| Year | No. | % | No. | % | No. | % |
|---|---|---|---|---|---|---|
| 2025 | 354 | 39.51% | 531 | 59.26% | 11 | 1.23% |
| 2021 | 324 | 47.72% | 345 | 50.81% | 10 | 1.47% |
| 2017 | 202 | 38.77% | 303 | 58.16% | 16 | 3.07% |
| 2013 | 372 | 65.03% | 191 | 33.39% | 9 | 1.57% |
| 2009 | 316 | 47.45% | 284 | 42.64% | 66 | 9.91% |
| 2005 | 276 | 46.94% | 293 | 49.83% | 19 | 3.23% |

In the 2012 presidential election, Democrat Barack Obama received 59.5% of the vote (632 cast), ahead of Republican Mitt Romney with 39.3% (417 votes), and other candidates with 1.2% (13 votes), among the 1,076 ballots cast by the borough's 1,618 registered voters (14 ballots were spoiled), for a turnout of 66.5%. In the 2008 presidential election, Democrat Barack Obama received 59.3% of the vote (625 cast), ahead of Republican John McCain with 38.1% (402 votes) and other candidates with 1.3% (14 votes), among the 1,054 ballots cast by the borough's 1,492 registered voters, for a turnout of 70.6%. In the 2004 presidential election, Republican George W. Bush received 49.7% of the vote (448 ballots cast), outpolling Democrat John Kerry with 49.4% (445 votes) and other candidates with 0.4% (5 votes), among the 901 ballots cast by the borough's 1,301 registered voters, for a turnout percentage of 69.3.

In the 2013 gubernatorial election, Republican Chris Christie received 65.0% of the vote (372 cast), ahead of Democrat Barbara Buono with 33.4% (191 votes), and other candidates with 1.6% (9 votes), among the 581 ballots cast by the borough's 1,597 registered voters (9 ballots were spoiled), for a turnout of 36.4%. In the 2009 gubernatorial election, Republican Chris Christie received 46.1% of the vote (316 ballots cast), ahead of Democrat Jon Corzine with 41.5% (284 votes), Independent Chris Daggett with 9.5% (65 votes) and other candidates with 0.1% (1 votes), among the 685 ballots cast by the borough's 1,507 registered voters, yielding a 45.5% turnout.

United States Senate election results for Swedesboro1
| Year | Republican | | Democratic | | Third party(ies) | |
| Year | No. | % | No. | % | No. | % |
|---|---|---|---|---|---|---|
| 2024 | 463 | 40.26% | 665 | 57.83% | 22 | 1.91% |
| 2018 | 332 | 43.23% | 390 | 50.78% | 46 | 5.99% |
| 2012 | 389 | 37.91% | 597 | 58.19% | 40 | 3.90% |
| 2006 | 290 | 46.40% | 315 | 50.40% | 20 | 3.20% |

United States Senate election results for Swedesboro2
| Year | Republican | | Democratic | | Third party(ies) | |
| Year | No. | % | No. | % | No. | % |
|---|---|---|---|---|---|---|
| 2020 | 518 | 40.31% | 735 | 57.20% | 32 | 2.49% |
| 2014 | 209 | 42.92% | 257 | 52.77% | 21 | 4.31% |
| 2013 | 141 | 47.64% | 154 | 52.03% | 1 | 0.34% |
| 2008 | 377 | 38.27% | 584 | 59.29% | 24 | 2.44% |

== Education ==
Public school students in pre-kindergarten through sixth grade attend the Swedesboro-Woolwich School District, a consolidated school district that serves students from both Swedesboro and Woolwich Township. As of the 2020–21 school year, the district, comprised of four schools, had an enrollment of 1,495 students and 138.7 classroom teachers (on an FTE basis), for a student–teacher ratio of 10.8:1. Schools in the district (with 2020–21 enrollment data from the National Center for Education Statistics) are Margaret C. Clifford School with 230 students in grades Pre-K–K (located in Swedesboro), Governor Charles C. Stratton School with 402 students in grades 1–2 (Woolwich Township), General Charles G. Harker School with 653 students in Grades 3–5 (Woolwich Township), and Walter H. Hill School with 210 students in Grade 6 (Swedesboro).

Public school students in seventh through twelfth grades are educated by the Kingsway Regional School District, which also serves students from East Greenwich Township, South Harrison Township and Woolwich Township, with the addition of students from Logan Township who attend the district's high school as part of a sending/receiving relationship in which tuition is paid on a per-pupil basis by the Logan Township School District. Swedesboro accounts for one tenth of district enrollment. As of the 2020–21 school year, the high school district, comprised of two schools, had an enrollment of 2,868 students and 207.8 classroom teachers (on an FTE basis), for a student–teacher ratio of 13.8:1. The schools in the district (with 2020–21 enrollment data from the National Center for Education Statistics) are Kingsway Regional Middle School with 1,023 students in grades 7–8, and Kingsway Regional High School with 1,802 students in grades 9–12. Under a 2011 proposal, Kingsway would merge with its constituent member's K–6 districts to become a full K–12 district, with various options for including Logan Township as part of the consolidated district.

Students from across the county are eligible to apply to attend Gloucester County Institute of Technology, a four-year high school in Deptford Township that provides technical and vocational education. As a public school, students do not pay tuition to attend the school.

Guardian Angels Regional School is a K-8 school that operates under the auspices of the Roman Catholic Diocese of Camden and accepts students from Swedesboro. Its PreK-3 campus is in Gibbstown while its 4-8 campus is in Paulsboro.

== Transportation ==
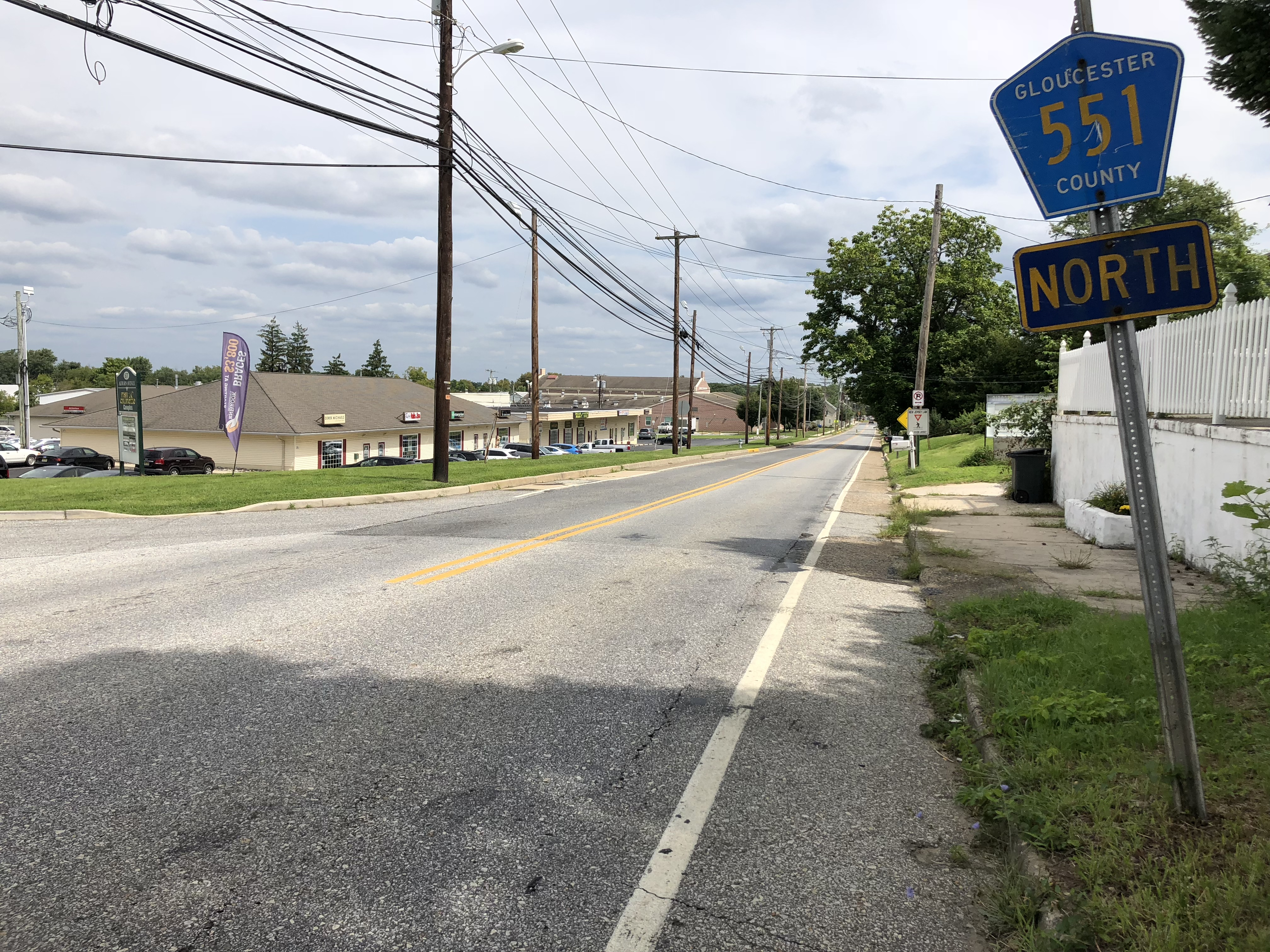
County Route 551 in Swedesboro

=== Roads and highways ===
As of May 2010, the borough had a total of 10.94 miles (17.61 km) of roadways, of which 7.29 miles (11.73 km) were maintained by the municipality and 3.65 miles (5.87 km) by Gloucester County.

There are several main roads serving Swedesboro. The most significant are County Route 538 and County Route 551. U.S. Route 322 and the New Jersey Turnpike can be accessed in neighboring Woolwich Township.

=== Public transportation ===
NJ Transit provides bus service between Salem and Philadelphia on the 401 route.

The Woodbury and Swedesboro Railroad was incorporated in 1854 to build a rail line from Woodbury to Swedesboro, but construction never commenced. This line was ultimately built by the Swedesboro Railroad, opening in October 1869 under lease to the West Jersey Railroad. In February 1883, the Woodstown and Swedesboro Railroad opened an extension of the line southward to Woodstown and a junction with the Salem Railroad at Riddleton, which was also leased by the West Jersey Railroad. The combined lines were operated as the Salem Branch.

The line continues to operate today as a freight railroad. The line north of Swedesboro, the former Swedesboro Railroad, is operated by the Southern Railroad of New Jersey. The line to the south, the former Woodstown and Swedesboro Railroad, is operated by SMS Rail Lines.

== Wineries ==
- Wagonhouse Winery in South Harrison Township

== Notable people ==
People who were born in, residents of, or otherwise closely associated with Swedesboro include:

- Kenneth A. Black Jr. (1932–2019), politician who served in the New Jersey General Assembly from District 3A from 1968 to 1974
- Dorien Bryant (born 1985), former college football wide receiver for the Purdue Boilermakers and Pittsburgh Steelers signatory
- Nicholas Collin (1746–1831), Swedish-born American Lutheran minister, Doctor of Divinity, inventor, and member of the American Philosophical Society. He ministered at Trinity Old Swedes' Church in Swedesboro from 1770-1786.
- Charles G. Garrison (1849–1924), physician, lawyer, and judge who served as Associate Justice of the New Jersey Supreme Court from 1888 to 1893 and from 1896 to 1900
- Charles Garrison Harker (1837–1864), brigadier general in the Union Army during the American Civil War
- Benjamin Franklin Howey (1828–1893), politician who represented New Jersey's 4th congressional district from 1883 to 1885
- William Nicholson Jeffers (1824–1883), United States Navy officer
- Kenneth Lacovara (born 1961), paleontologist best known for his discovery of Dreadnoughtus
- Ted Laux (1919–1965), NFL football player who played for the Philadelphia Eagles and the "Steagles", a temporary merger between the Eagles and Pittsburgh Steelers due to World War II-era player shortages
- Stephen Mallozzi (born 2001), professional stock car racer in the NASCAR Camping World Truck Series
- Anthony Potero, content creator and social media influencer
- Earl Rapp (1921–1992), professional baseball outfielder and scout
- Charles C. Stratton (1796–1859), 15th Governor of New Jersey
- Joseph Pere Bell Wilmer (1812–1878), second Episcopal bishop of Louisiana
