= Trinity Church (Swedesboro, New Jersey) =

Historic church in Gloucester County, New Jersey, US

- Trinity Episcopal "Old Swedes" Church
- U.S. National Register of Historic Places
- New Jersey Register of Historic Places
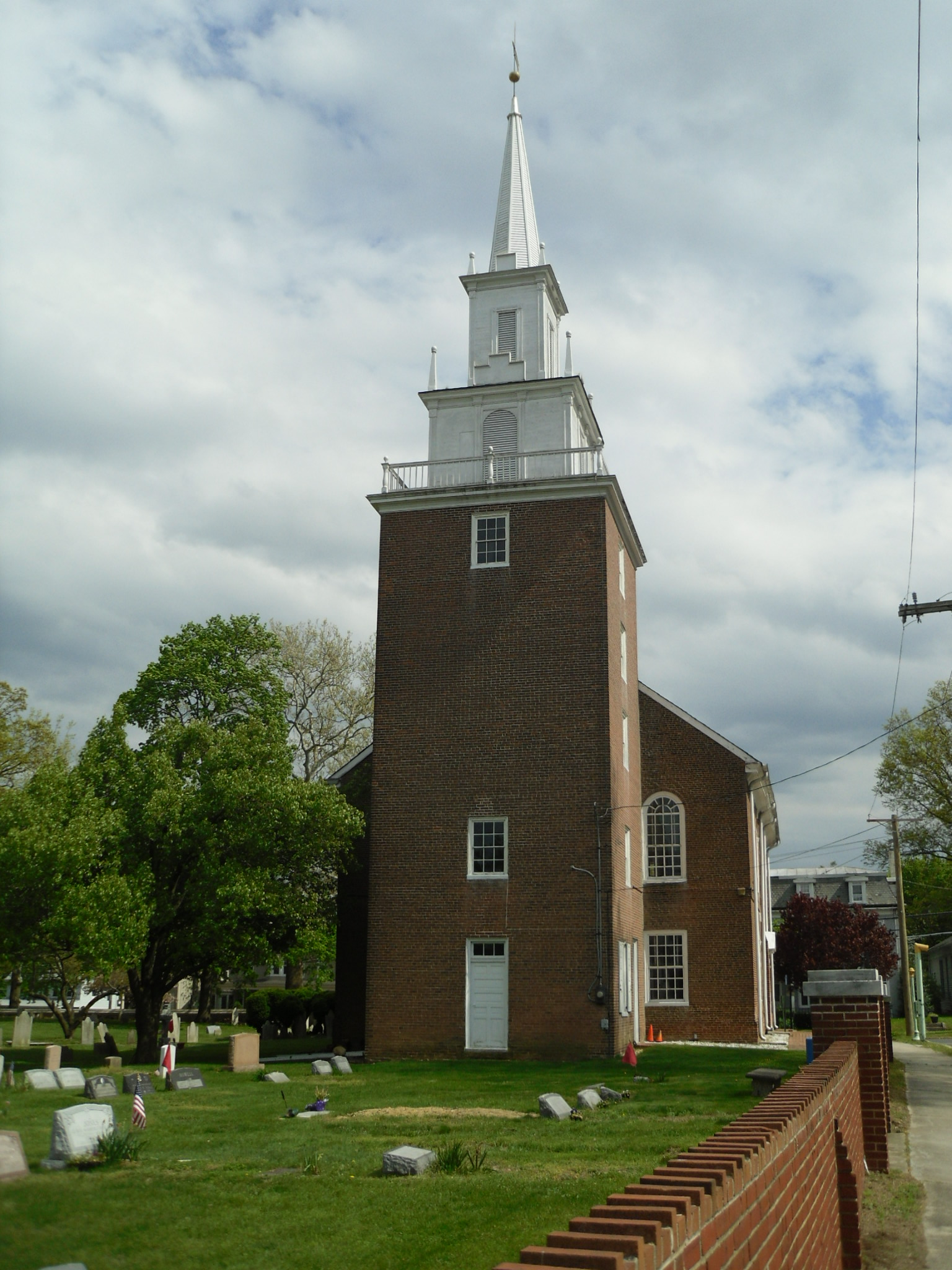
- Trinity Church in Swedesboro, New Jersey, U.S.

- Location within Gloucester County, New Jersey Location within New Jersey Location within the United States
- Location: Northwest corner of Church Street and King's Highway, Swedesboro, New Jersey, U.S.
- Coordinates: 39°45′02″N 75°18′25″W
- Area: 2.5 acres (1.0 ha)
- Built: 1786
- Architect: The Rev. Nicholas Collin
- Architectural style: Georgian, Federal
- NRHP reference No.: 73001098
- NJRHP No.: 1415

Significant dates
- Added to NRHP: January 29, 1973
- Designated NJRHP: May 1, 1972

Trinity Episcopal Church, also known as Trinity Old Swedes' Church, is a historic church on the northwest corner of Church Street and King's Highway in Swedesboro in Gloucester County, New Jersey, U.S.

The congregation was founded as a Swedish Lutheran parish in 1703, after local residents tired of crossing the Delaware River to Fort Christiana near Wilmington to worship. The first minister, Lars Tollstadius, arrived in the area in 1701. The church was the first Swedish congregation in New Jersey and originally it worshiped in a log building. Services were held in Swedish until 1784. The building was added to the National Register of Historic Places in 1973 for its significance in architecture and religion.

It is a congregation of the Episcopal Diocese of New Jersey. The church reported 82 members in 2019 and 67 members in 2025. Plate and pledge income reported for the congregation in 2024 was $115,654. Average Sunday attendance (ASA) in 2025 was 24 persons, down from a reported 35 in 2017.

== History ==
In 1641, Peter Hollander Ridder, the second governor of New Sweden purchased from local Indians the entire eastern side of the Delaware River extending from Raccoon Creek to Cape May. The first settlement by the Swedes was on the banks of Raccoon Creek, originally named Raccoon and later Swedesboro.

To attend church, the Swedish settlers in Raccoon had to cross the river to Wilmington or Philadelphia. The difficulty of this crossing led to the decision to build a new church on the banks of Raccoon Creek. The site selected was near the new bridge for Kings Highway, which led from Burlington to Salem. In 1703, they purchased 100 acres (0.40 km^{2}) along the Raccoon Creek and on part of it established their own church, the first Swedish language church in New Jersey.

Trinity Church was originally a Swedish Lutheran Parish. From 1703 to 1786, it was served by clergy sent from Sweden. With the completion of a new church building in 1786, the Swedish Mission was drawing to a close. The Swedish language was almost extinct and the people no longer felt the same bond of sympathy with the land of their forebears. The congregations in New Jersey did not desire new pastors from Sweden and could not afford to offer them decent support. In October 1789 a semblance of affiliation by Trinity Church with the Episcopal Church in America began. The church is now known as Trinity Episcopal "Old Swedes" Church and is a member parish of the Episcopal Diocese of New Jersey.

== Cemetery ==
Trinity Church Cemetery (also known as Trinity Episcopal "Old Swedes" Church Cemetery) is located behind Trinity Church.

=== Notable interments ===
- Louis H. Carpenter (February 11, 1839 – January 21, 1916) – Indian Wars Congressional Medal of Honor recipient and Spanish–American War General.
- Charles Garrison Harker (December 2, 1835 – June 27, 1864) – American Civil War Brigadier General in the Union Army.
- Benjamin Franklin Howey (March 17, 1828 – February 6, 1895) – Republican Congressman to the Forty-eighth United States Congress (1883–1885).
- Charles Creighton Stratton (March 6, 1796 – March 30, 1859) – Served in the United States House of Representatives and was later the 15th Governor of New Jersey.
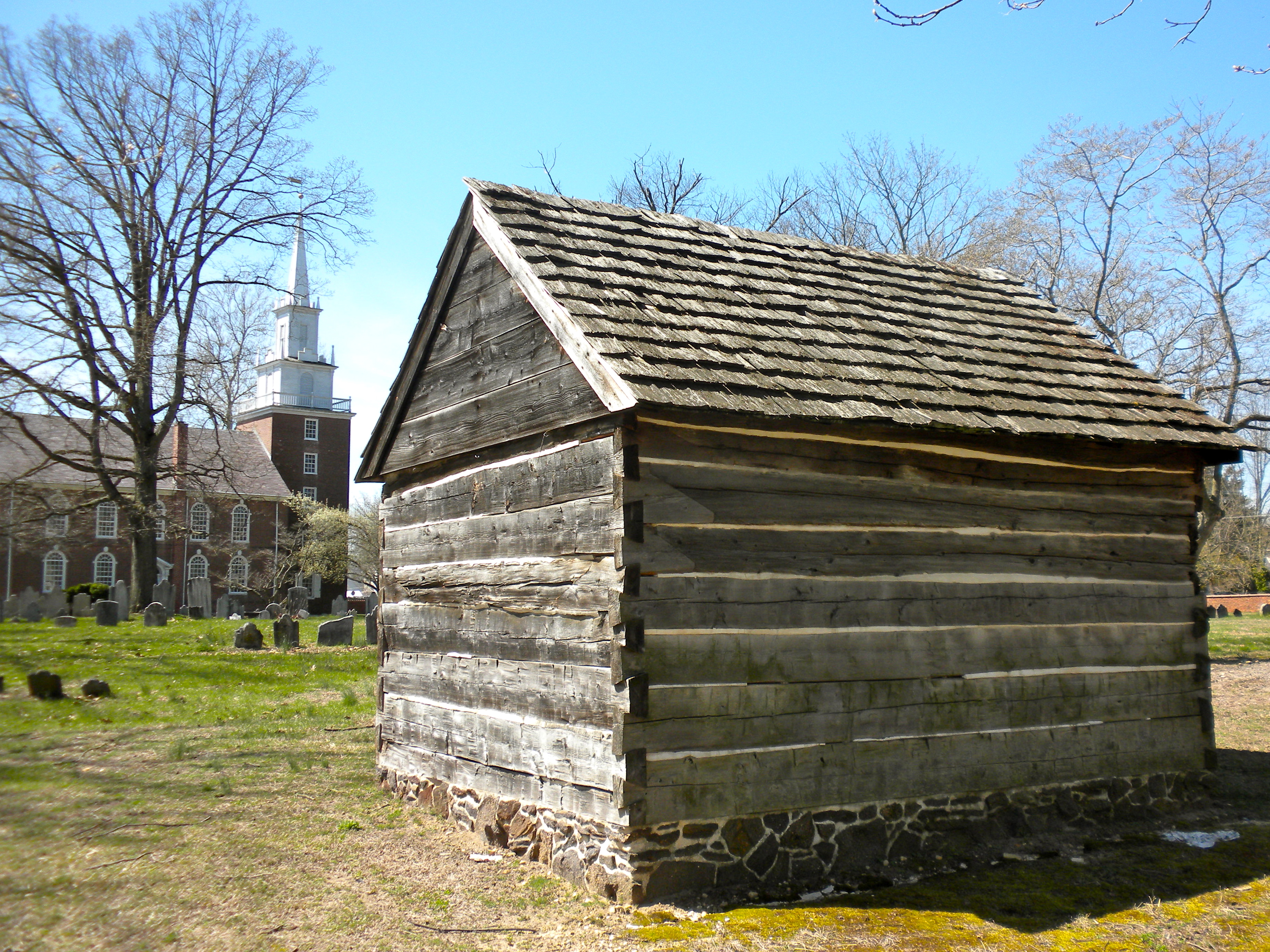
Mortonson-Van Leer Log Cabin, ca. 1700, with the cemetery in between the cabin and church

== See also ==
- National Register of Historic Places listings in Gloucester County, New Jersey
- Churchtown, New Jersey, site of Penns Neck church
