= National historic site =

National historic site may refer to:

- National Historic Sites of Canada
- National Historic Sites (United States)

== See also ==
- Historic site
- List of heritage registers
