= Churchtown, New Jersey =

Populated place in Salem County, New Jersey, US

- Unincorporated community
- Location within Salem County, New Jersey Location within New Jersey Location within the United States
- Coordinates: 39°40′19″N 75°30′36″W
- Country: United States
- State: New Jersey
- County: Salem
- Township: Pennsville
- Elevation: 7 ft (2.1 m)
- GNIS feature ID: 875439

Churchtown, historically known as Penns Neck, is an unincorporated community located north of Pennsville in Pennsville Township, Salem County, New Jersey. St. George's Episcopal Church was started here in 1714 by Swedish and Finnish settlers as a Lutheran church.

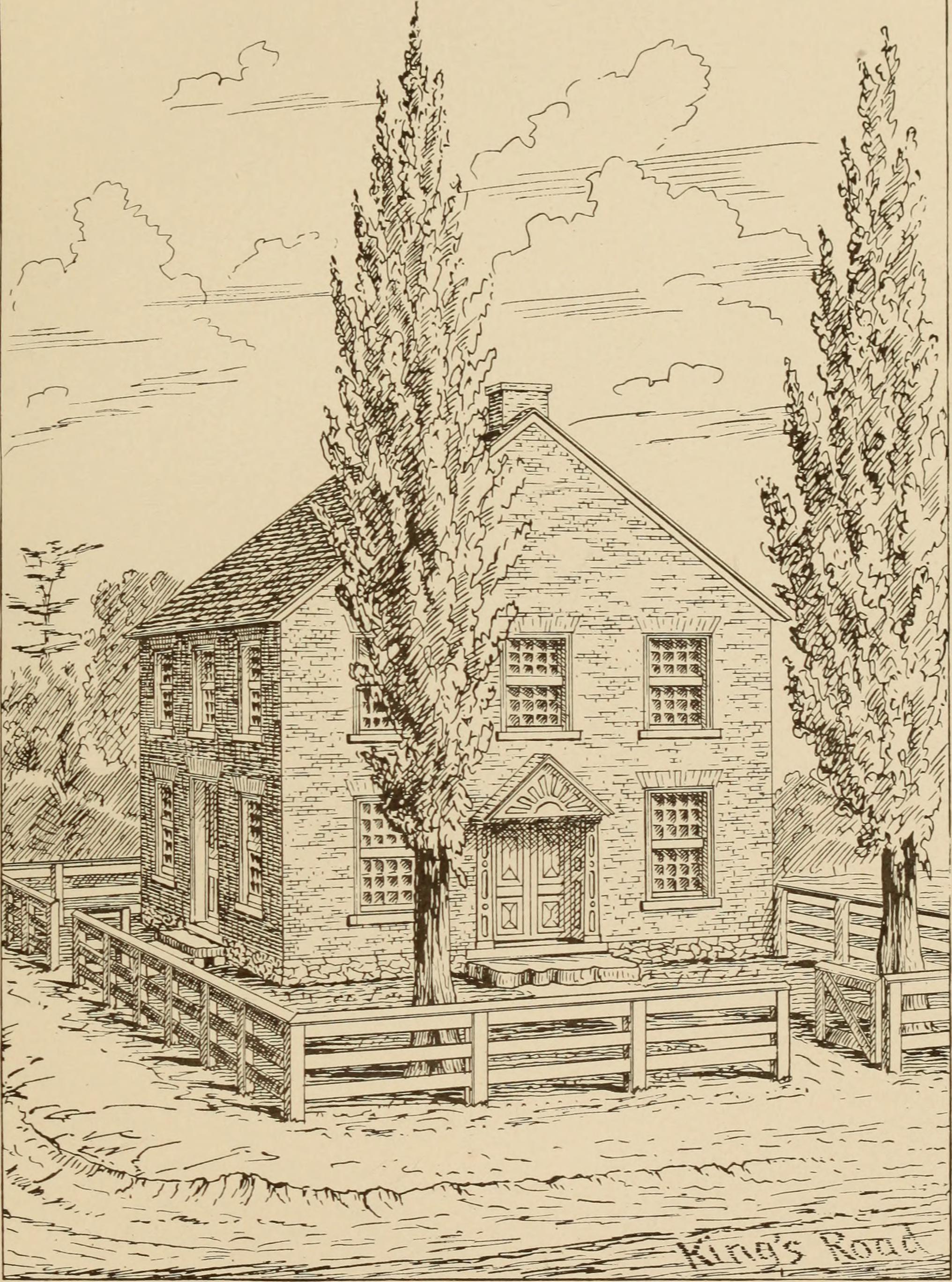
St. George's, Penns Neck, N.J.
Illustration from 1903

== See also ==
- Trinity Church (Swedesboro, New Jersey) – Swedish Lutheran church at Raccoon
