= Lists of wars involving the United States =

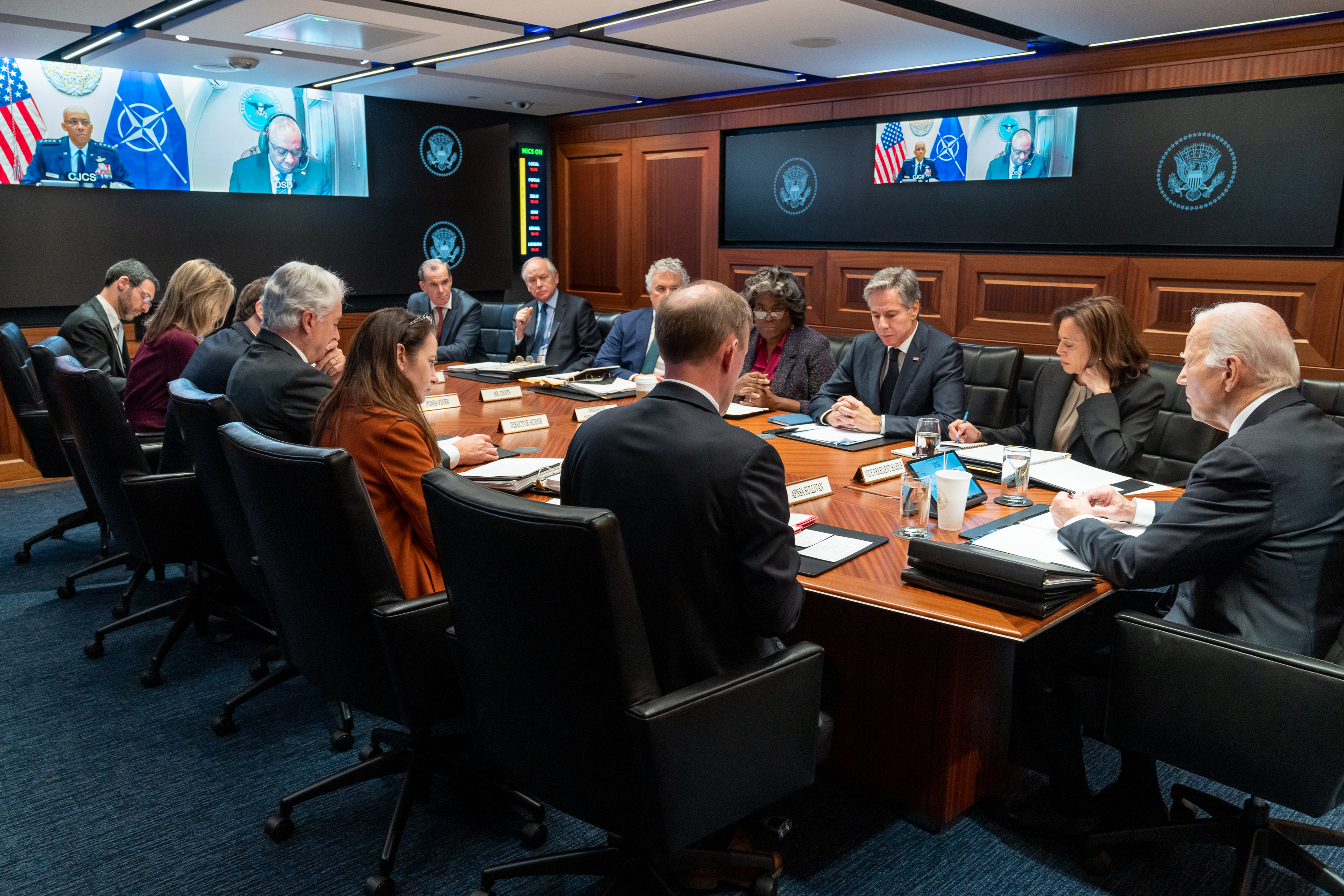
Situation Room, the operations center at the White House with advanced communications equipment for the president to maintain command and control of U.S. forces around the world.

This is an index of lists detailing military conflicts involving the United States, organized by time period.

Although the United States has formally declared war only five times and these declarations cover a total of 11 separate instances against specific nations, there are currently 209 non-colonial military conflicts included in these lists, 7 of which are ongoing. Between all seven lists, there are currently 248 military conflicts.

Formal declarations of war include the War of 1812 (United Kingdom), the Mexican–American War (Mexico), the Spanish–American War (Spain), World War I (Germany and Austria-Hungary) and World War II (Japan, Germany, Italy, Bulgaria, Hungary and Romania).

Since World War II, the U.S. has engaged in numerous military operations authorized by Congress or initiated by the executive branch without formal declarations of war; notable examples include the Cold War (the Korean War, the Vietnam War, and the Gulf War), the War on terror (the War in Afghanistan and the War against ISIS), and interventions aimed at regime change (the Iraq War, Libya, and the Iran War).

As of the current date, the United States is involved in 7 publicly known military engagements across 6 different wars. Wars with direct U.S. involvement include War on terror (Somalia and Yemen), the war on cartels (Operation Southern Spear), and the Iran War. Wars with indirect U.S. involvement include the Russo-Ukrainian war (U.S. involvement), the Gaza war (U.S. involvement), and the Israel–Hezbollah conflict. (Note: The United States provides military support, training, or shares intelligence with one or more parties in a conflict without directly engaging in combat with its own troops. In addition if the United States made arrests in benefit of an alley or to serve its own interests within a conflict, it may be included on these lists. For example Fenian raids and the arrest of William Walker during the Filibuster War.)

== Lists ==
1609–1700	List of 17th-century wars involving the Thirteen Colonies	Thirteen Colonies of British America before U.S. Independence
Summary: Native American confederacies stood as the primary opponents to English expansion, defining this period through early survival conflicts with colonists, such as the Anglo-Powhatan Wars in Virginia and the Pequot War in Southern New England. As colonial populations rapidly grew, the friction escalated into devastating regional struggles like King Philip's War, a conflict that resulted in a higher per-capita casualty rate than any other war in Colonial American history and ultimately ended in a defeat for the Native Americans, leaving the tribes permanently weakened and unable to stop colonial expansion.		Thirteen Colonies of British America before U.S. Independence
1701–1774	List of 18th-century wars involving the Thirteen Colonies	Thirteen Colonies of British America before U.S. Independence
Summary: The Thirteen Colonies were drawn directly into a series of major European power struggles transposed onto North American soil, where imperial rivalries between Kingdom of Great Britain, Kingdom of France, and Spanish Empire played out across the wilderness frontiers. Conflicts like Queen Anne's War and King George's War forced American colonists to organize local militias and fight alongside British soldiers, binding the fate of the colonies tightly to European geopolitics. The era culminated in the French and Indian War (the North American theater of the Seven Years' War) which placed British forces and their colonial allies against the French and various Native American nations. By removing the French threat and giving local militias vital combat experience, this victory left the colonies newly empowered and highly self-reliant.		Thirteen Colonies of British America before U.S. Independence
1775–1800	List of wars involving the United States in the 18th century	United States Countries the United States have fought in, attacked or declared war based on locations on the lists Ongoing wars directly involving the United States Map of the terrestrial Geographic Combat Commands of the United States
Summary: The American Revolutionary War successfully secured United States independence from the British Empire. Following the revolution, the new nation immediately faced localized conflicts as it sought to stabilize its fragile economy, assert federal authority over its frontiers, and protect its borders. These efforts led to the Northwest Indian War against a confederation of Native American tribes to secure western territorial expansion. At the same time, the United States sought to secure its commercial interests overseas by forming a permanent navy, which immediately engaged in undeclared maritime warfare such as the Quasi-War against France.		United States Countries the United States have fought in, attacked or declared war based on locations on the lists Ongoing wars directly involving the United States Map of the terrestrial Geographic Combat Commands of the United States
1801–1850	List of wars involving the United States in the first half of the 19th century	United States Countries the United States have fought in, attacked or declared war based on locations on the lists Ongoing wars directly involving the United States Map of the terrestrial Geographic Combat Commands of the United States
Summary: The first half of the 19th century featured the War of 1812 against Great Britain, which solidified American sovereignty, alongside the Barbary Wars to defend shipping interests in the Mediterranean Sea. This era also saw extensive internal conflicts, including the Seminole Wars and the implementation of the Indian Removal Act, which forcibly displaced Native American tribes westward of the Mississippi River. The period concluded with the Mexican–American War, which drastically expanded the nation's boundaries to the Pacific Coast via the Mexican Cession, a treaty agreement in which Mexico ceded roughly 55 percent of its pre-war territory.		United States Countries the United States have fought in, attacked or declared war based on locations on the lists Ongoing wars directly involving the United States Map of the terrestrial Geographic Combat Commands of the United States
1851–1900	List of wars involving the United States in the second half of the 19th century	United States Countries the United States have fought in, attacked or declared war based on locations on the lists Ongoing wars directly involving the United States Map of the terrestrial Geographic Combat Commands of the United States
Summary: The second half of 19th century was dominated by the American Civil War, the bloodiest conflict in United States history, which preserved the Union and abolished slavery. The late 1800s were also characterized by the ongoing American Indian Wars in the West and the expansionist Spanish–American War, which resulted in the acquisition of Guam, Puerto Rico, and the Philippine Islands from Spain, while establishing temporary control over Cuba, that secured the long-term lease of Guantánamo Bay. By the end of the century, the United States further extended its reach by annexing the Hawaiian Islands following the overthrow of the Hawaiian Kingdom.		United States Countries the United States have fought in, attacked or declared war based on locations on the lists Ongoing wars directly involving the United States Map of the terrestrial Geographic Combat Commands of the United States
1901–2000	List of wars involving the United States in the 20th century	United States Countries the United States have fought in, attacked or declared war based on locations on the lists Ongoing wars directly involving the United States Map of the terrestrial Geographic Combat Commands of the United States
Summary: After the final engagements of the American Indian Wars in the early 1900s, the 20th century emerged as the costliest and bloodiest era for the nation in foreign conflicts. As its domestic frontiers closed, the United States increasingly turned its attention outward, expanding its geopolitical influence across the Atlantic and Pacific oceans. During the century, major interventions in World War I and World War II transformed the United States into a global superpower. These pivotal victories led to the eventual fall of traditional global empires, the defeat of fascism in Europe, and the collapse of Japanese imperialism, concluding with the historic first operational use of nuclear weapons at Hiroshima and Nagasaki. In the middle of the 20th century, the newly formed CIA began conducting covert operations globally. The subsequent Cold War was defined by the persistent threat of nuclear conflict and the containment of communism, drawing the American forces into major Asian campaigns, most notably the Korean War and the deeply polarizing Vietnam War. U.S. military efforts directly influenced regional borders and governance, such as the preservation of South Korea's independence, the safeguarding of Taiwan's autonomous status, and the restoration of Kuwaiti sovereignty. Among the high-profile foreign figures the United States targeted or helped depose were Adolf Hitler, Benito Mussolini, Isoroku Yamamoto, Hideki Tojo, Che Guevara, Hudson Austin, Manuel Noriega, Raoul Cédras, and Slobodan Milošević.		United States Countries the United States have fought in, attacked or declared war based on locations on the lists Ongoing wars directly involving the United States Map of the terrestrial Geographic Combat Commands of the United States
2001–present	List of wars involving the United States in the 21st century	United States Countries the United States have fought in, attacked or declared war based on locations on the lists Ongoing wars directly involving the United States Map of the terrestrial Geographic Combat Commands of the United States
Summary: Following the September 11 attacks, the United States launched the global War on Terror. This campaign involved significant military operations in the Middle East, such as the War in Afghanistan and the Iraq War. Operations later expanded into complex counter-insurgency campaigns alongside international coalitions against al-Qaeda, ISIS, Al-Shabaab and others, accompanied by a widespread expansion of global drone strike campaigns. The United States targeted and helped overthrow high-profile figures and militant leaders worldwide, including Osama bin Laden, Ayman al-Zawahiri, Anwar al-Awlaki, Abu Musab al-Zarqawi, Abu Ayyub al-Masri, Akhtar Mansur, Baitullah Mehsud, Abu Bakr al-Baghdadi, Abu Ibrahim al-Hashimi al-Qurashi, Ahmed Abu Khattala, Joseph Kony, Saddam Hussein, Muammar Gaddafi, Bashar al-Assad, Nicolás Maduro, Qasem Soleimani, and Ali Khamenei.		United States Countries the United States have fought in, attacked or declared war based on locations on the lists Ongoing wars directly involving the United States Map of the terrestrial Geographic Combat Commands of the United States

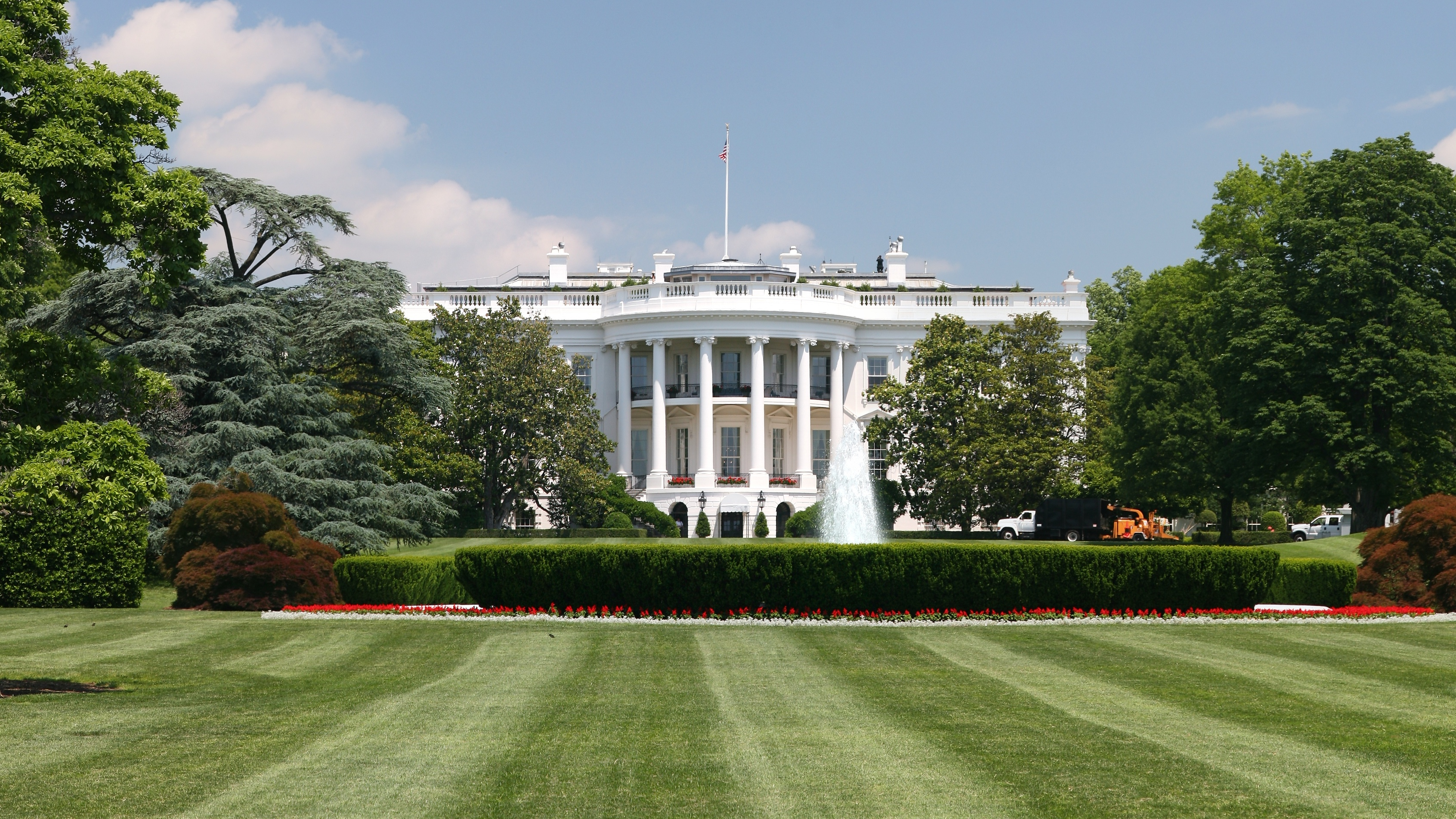
The White House, the seat of the President of the United States in Washington, D.C.. The president is the commander-in-chief of the U.S. Armed Forces.

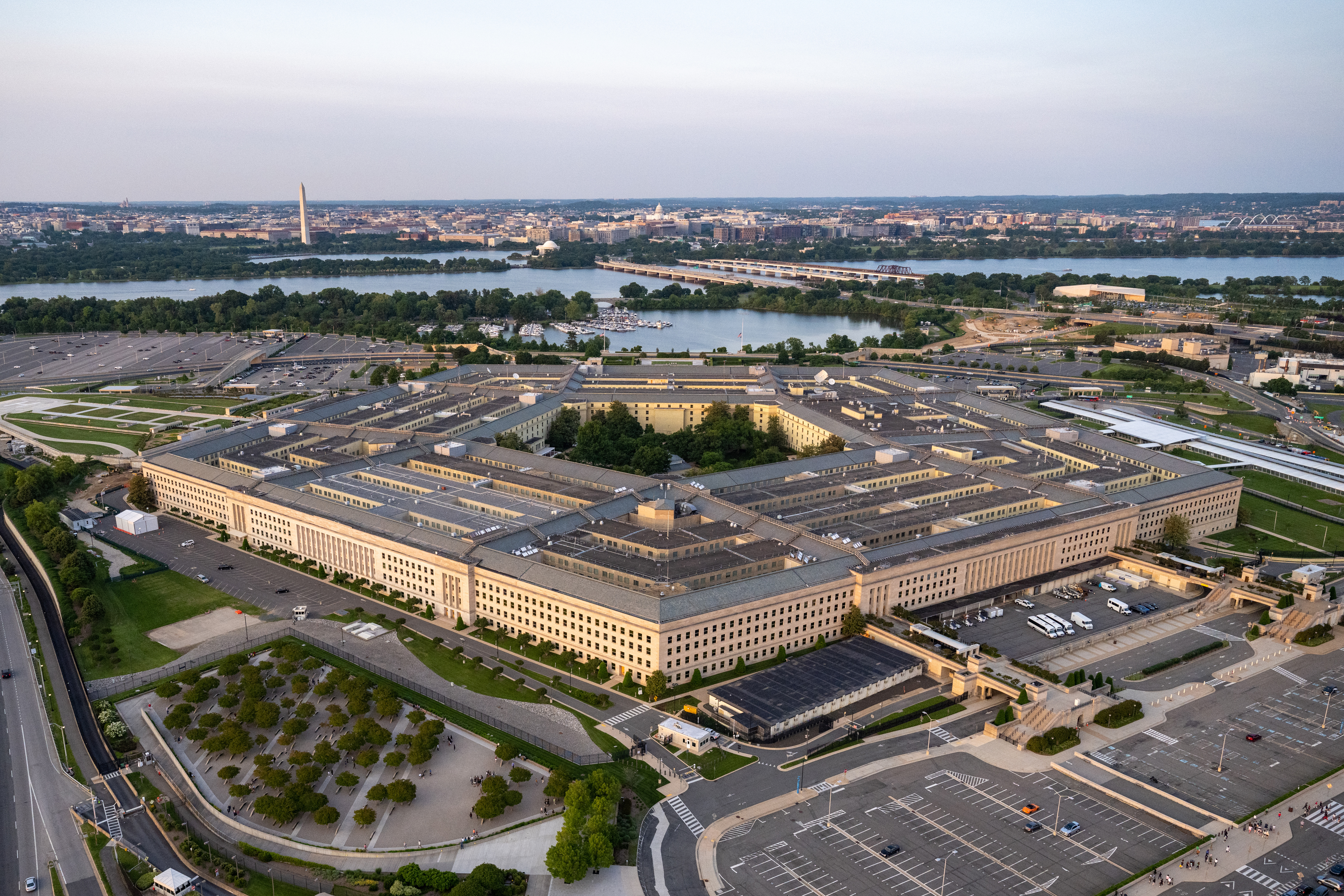
The United States Department of Defense headquarters at the Pentagon in Washington, D.C. USDOD coordinating and supervising the 6 U.S. armed services: the Army, Navy, Marines, Air Force, Space Force, and the Coast Guard.

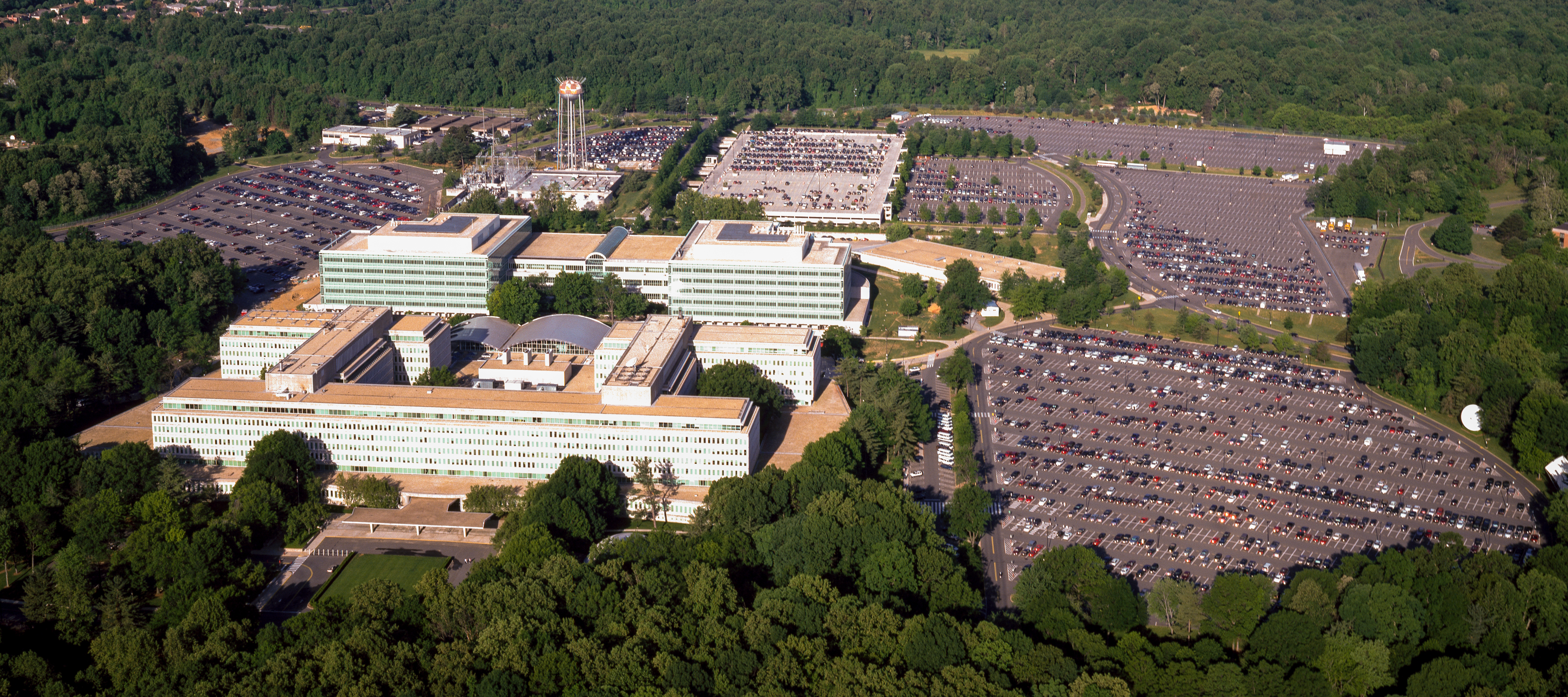
Central Intelligence Agency (CIA) headquarters at the George Bush Center for Intelligence in Langley, Virginia. CIA collecting and analyzing intelligence from around the world and conducting covert operations.

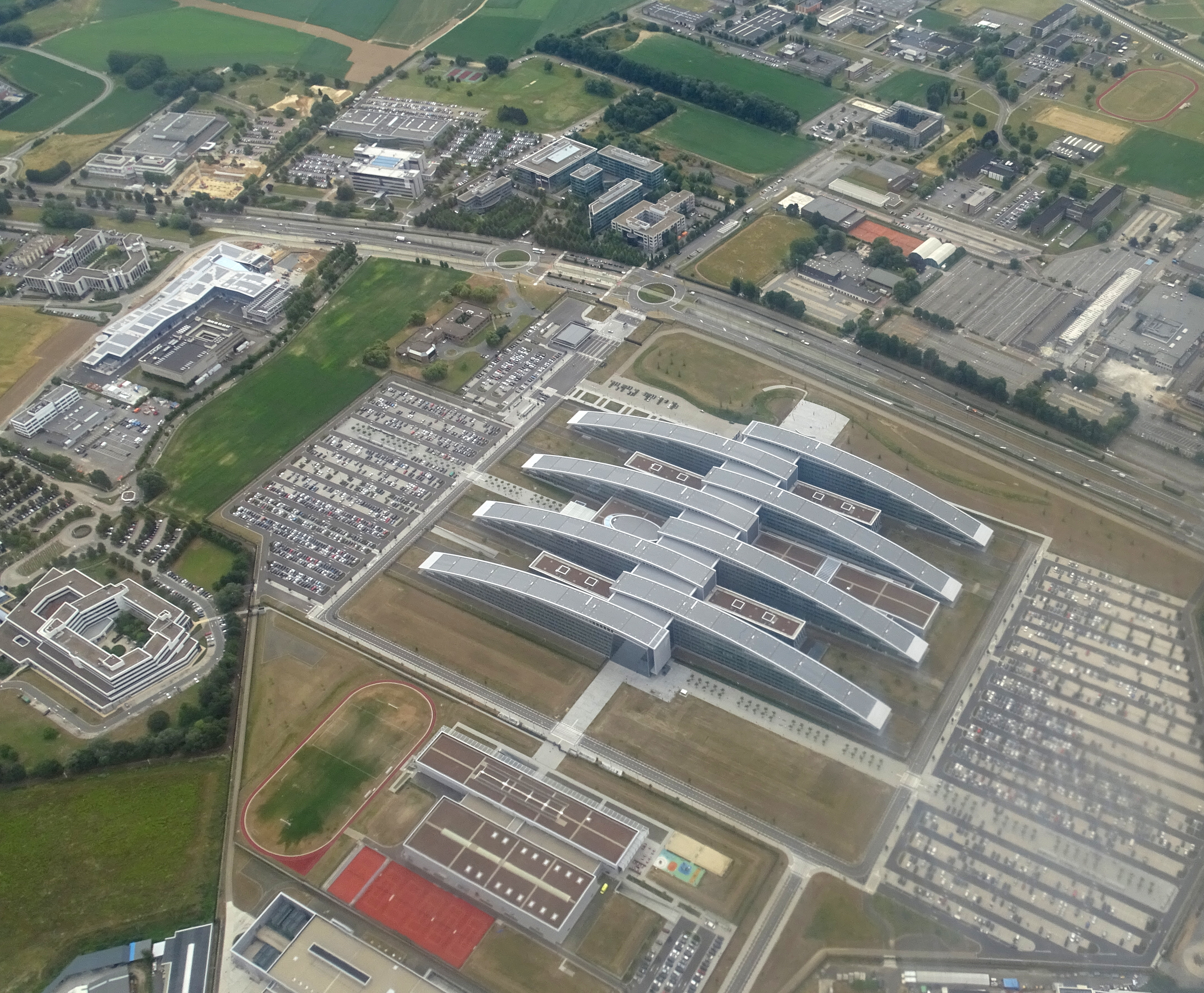
North Atlantic Treaty Organization (NATO) headquarters in Brussels, Belgium. The United States is the leading power in the world's most powerful military alliance.

== Notes ==
Criteria for inclusion on these lists
1. Under Article I, Section 8 of the U.S. Constitution, Congress holds the exclusive power to declare war. The United States has only officially declared war five times in the War of 1812, the Mexican–American War, the Spanish–American War, World War I, and World War II. These declarations cover a total of 11 separate instances against specific nations. This would exclude the American Civil War, the Vietnam War and the War in Afghanistan, in addition to many other conflicts. To display a wider sense of the scope of U.S. involvement in "wars", these lists focus on any military conflicts involving the United States military regardless of size.
2. There are several related articles that cover other forms of violence, such as Attacks on the United States, List of rebellions in the United States, List of massacres in the United States, and list of Family feuds in the United States. List of conflicts in the United States covers any type of violent action in the U.S., ranging from isolated homicide, to wars that would meet the criteria for inclusion in this article series.
3. These lists do not focus on small-scale rebellions, single terror attacks, riots, assassinations, labor wars, state wars, feuds, range wars, or gang wars, as much as military conflicts involving the United States military (U.S. Army, U.S. Navy, U.S. Marine Corps, U.S. Airforce, U.S. Coast Guard (when acting in a military capacity), U.S. Space Force, the United States Intelligence Agencies (when acting in a military capacity; for instance, the Special Activities Center), the United States Public Health Service Commissioned Corps, NOAA Commissioned Officer Corps, Merchant Marines, and U.S. private military companies.
4. These lists may include operations against piracy, if it involves the United States military, but generally should cover a whole operation and not a single action or battle, unless that particular operation was wide but only consisted of one major battle. For example, Operation Ocean Shield included several conflicts such as the Dai Hong Dan incident and the Maersk Alabama hijacking. Operation Ocean Shield can be included, because it is part of a wider conflict, but the Dai Hong Dan incident and the Maersk Alabama hijacking would not. Similarly, the Aegean Sea anti-piracy operations of the United States had several battles, but only one more thoroughly reported (Battle of Doro Passage). These operations would be included, but not the Battle of Doro Passage. An exception to the rule of single battles is if a conflict is a punitive action or hostage rescue mission and marks a single operation that only involved one battle, such as the Battle of Ty-ho Bay.
5. These lists do not include conflicts where the United States was involved only in providing military aid (weapons, ammunition, vehicles and other equipment), humanitarian aid, financial assistance or diplomatic support to other parties (e.g., Bangladesh Liberation War, Calderonista invasion of Costa Rica, Operation Unified Assistance, Nepalese Civil War, or Western Sahara War).
6. These lists may include operations involving capturing of military or merchant vessels and/or military personnel either from the United States to another nation or enemy Non-state actor; or from another nation or Non-state actor to the United States. For example the 2016 U.S.–Iran naval incident and the takeover of the MV Morning Glory by Navy Seals, are incidents that may be included on these lists. However, similar to criteria 4 if this incident is part of a wider conflict and not a stand alone incident it should not be included. For example, the United States seizure of the oil tanker Skipper should not be included as it was a part of the United States military buildup in the Caribbean during Operation Southern Spear and its related strikes on vessels, and relatedly the capture of the USS Pueblo (AGER-2) by North Korea should not be included, because it is a part of the Korean DMZ Conflict.
7. List of 17th-century wars involving the Thirteen Colonies and List of 18th-century wars involving the Thirteen Colonies both serve as a historical prequel, in that they focus on the colonies and territories that later made up the United States. As such, the criteria will be similar and different in several respects. (Note: Please go to the colonial wars lists for more specifics about the criteria for those lists.)

Examples for criteria that are not included
Assassinations or assassination attempts: Assassination of John F. Kennedy or the Attempted assassination of Donald Trump in Pennsylvania.
Attacks on diplomatic missions: U.S. embassy bombing in Ankara, U.S. embassy attack in Sarajevo or the Lima bombing. (Note: Unless there is an active U.S. military defense or response in an isolated incident.)
Coup d'état or coup attempts: The Business plot or the Newburgh Conspiracy.
Cyber Wars: Operation Olympic Games or Operation Ababil. (Note: A form of military conflicts that takes place in cyberspace with cyber weapons.)
Evacuations from an active war zone: Operation Silver Wake, Operation Eastern Exit or Operation Shining Express. (Note: If it is demonstrated that an evacuation which is isolated from any other conflict, became a fighting withdrawal whereby U.S. forces came under fire and/or fired at an enemy while retreating then this may be considered a military conflict. A loose example of this would be Operation Libelle, however this operation itself would not be included as it did not involve the U.S. military.)
Feuds: The Hatfield's and McCoy feud or the Earp Vendetta Ride.
Filibuster Wars: The Texas Revolution, actions of the Ever Victorious Army, most of the William Walker Wars. (Note: This criterion is for wars involving American filibusters alone, not wars where the United States military fought with filibusters such as the Patriot War (Florida) and the Patriot War (Canada–United States border). This criterion is also not for the United States military capturing territory from American filibusters such as the U.S. capture of the Florida Parishes from the Republic of West Florida or the Amelia Island Affair.)
Gang Wars: The Dead Rabbits riot or the Castellammarese War.
Humanitarian military operations: Operation Unified Response, Operation Tomodachi or Operation Sahayogi Haat.
Isolated terrorist attacks: The Black Tom Bombing or the Beirut barracks bombings. (Note: Some terrorist attacks, such as 9/11 or the 2021 Kabul airport attack, may be considered as a part of a wider military such as the War in Afghanistan or Operation Inherent Resolve, but should not be included as conflicts among these articles.)
Labor Wars: The Great Railroad Strike or the Coal Wars. (Note: These conflicts may be considered a type of rebellion, even if the United States military were involved.)
Mutinies: The Somers Mutiny or the Port Chicago mutiny. (Note: For the purposes of these lists mutinies will be considered rebellions and will not be included on these lists.)
NATO exercises and U.S. military exercises: Ulchi-Freedom Guardian, Operation Saber Strike or Steadfast Defender.
NATO Enhanced Vigilance Activities: Operation Eastern Sentry, Arctic Sentry, Operation Active Fence or Operation Sea Guardian.
Posses: Ned Christie's War or the Willie Boy Manhhunt. (Note: If it can be demonstrated that the U.S. military participated in a posse conflict and if it is either sizable enough to be considered a war or was considered a military conflict, then this criterion does not apply. For example the Posey War.)
Post 1924 Indian Citizenship Act Conflicts with Native Americans: The Occupation of Alcatraz or the Wounded Knee Occupation. (Note: Before this act Native American Nations were considered sovereign Domestic dependent nations by the U.S. Federal government. After the Indian Citizenship Act native Americans were further granted American citizenship, albeit deprived of many civil rights in the year 1924. Currently Native American Nations still are federally held to be Domestic dependent nations, they possess suzerainty to the Federal government, but are territorially sovereign as among the individual United States. Thus any post 1924 are considered to be some category of an incident of civil unrest, and not a military conflict in of itself for the purposes and criteria of this list.)
Range Wars: The Johnson County War or the Castaic Range War.
Rebellions: The Whiskey Rebellion or the Ruby Ridge Siege, as well as Slave rebellions. (Note: The Civil War and Bleeding Kansas taken together were wider conflicts than the average rebellion. As such, editors mark these as exceptions to the general no-rebellion policy. In addition, all territorial rebellions such as the Philippine–American War, Moro War, Mormon Wars or the Puerto Rican Nationalist Party insurgency are exceptions as well.)
Riots: The L.A. Riots or the Battle of Liberty Place. (Note: Even if the United States military were involved for riot control.)
Secessionist military conflicts: List of wars involving the Confederate States of America (Note: Conflicts involving the United States are of course acceptable, provided they meet all other criteria. Stand alone conflicts that do not involve the United States, but involve rebel or secessionist groups should not be included.)
Shows of force/Gunboat diplomacy: The Panama crisis of 1885, Operation Brother Sam, and the 2011–2012 Strait of Hormuz dispute. (Note: If a show of force turns is or turned into a shooting action then it may be included on these lists. For example, the 2025 United States naval deployment in the Caribbean.)
Space-based incidents: Operation Burnt Frost (Note: Space Incidents for the purposes of these lists are to be distinguished between any future hypothetical space based military actions that involve military strikes against a foreign adversary and that are isolated to just the space domain. Strikes such as the latter can be included on these lists.)
State or local wars: The Toledo War or the Battle of Athens.
Trade Wars: China–United States trade war or United States trade war with Canada and Mexico.
UN Peacekeeping Missions and Non-UN Peacekeeping Missions: The International Force East Timor, the Kosovo Force or the Multinational Force and Observers. (Note: If a peacekeeping mission turns into a conflict, it can be added to the lists.)
Unverified sole conflicts involving U.S. military contractors or private contractors: The 2003 Transocean offshore oil rig strike and hostage situation. (Note: It must be verified that private military contractors were operating in a conflict under American military and/or intelligence employment and engaged in an exchange of fire and/or international hostage rescue mission to be included. Conflicts involving Private Military companies where it is unclear if the United States hired a (PMC) such as the 2003 Transocean offshore oil rig strike and hostage situation, should not be included unless proven otherwise. Furthermore, similar to stipulations in criteria's 4 and 7 if this incident is part of a wider conflict and not a stand alone incident it should not be included.)

== See also ==
- List of notable deployments of U.S. military forces overseas
- List of operations conducted by Delta Force
- List of operations conducted by SEAL Team Six
- Timeline of United States military operations
- List of CIA operations
- List of NATO operations
- United States Armed Forces
- List of American military installations
- List of United States overseas military installations
- List of United States drone bases
- Uniformed services of the United States
- United States military casualties of war
- List of conflicts involving the Texas Military
- List of conflicts in Hawaii
- Terrorism in the United States
- Timeline of terrorist attacks in the United States
- List of conflicts in the United States
- Lists of wars
- List of ongoing armed conflicts
- List of American Indian Wars
- Oyster Wars
- Military alliances involving the United States
- Irish military diaspora#United States
- List of incidents of civil unrest in the United States
- List of incidents of civil unrest in Colonial North America
- List of United States defense contractors
- Militarised interstate disputes
