= List of 18th-century wars involving the Thirteen Colonies =

This List of Colonial American Wars includes military conflicts involving the Thirteen Colonies and their predecessor colonies from 1701 to 1774. It covers the colonies that joined them prior to the American Revolution and the colonies' Independence in 1776 (for example the Plymouth Colony merged with Massachusetts Bay Colony in 1691 and the Saybrook Colony merged with Connecticut Colony in 1644). These would include the New England Colonies, Chesapeake Colonies, Middle Colonies, and the Southern Colonies, as well as in the British-controlled Ohio Country and Illinois Country.

There are 20 military conflicts in this list, excluded are all conflicts involving other British territories in British America that did not become part of the United States.

This list is part of a larger series of list articles that cover the various wars involving the United States from its colonial roots to the present. They are:

- Lists of wars involving the United States
  - List of 17th-century wars involving the Thirteen Colonies (1609–1700)
  - List of 18th-century wars involving the Thirteen Colonies (1701–1774)
  - List of wars involving the United States in the 18th century (1775–1800)
  - List of wars involving the United States in the 19th century (1801-1850)
  - List of wars involving the United States in the 19th century (1851-1900)
  - List of wars involving the United States in the 20th century (1901–2000)
  - List of wars involving the United States in the 21st century (2001–present)

While this list is related to the wars involving the United States, it serves as a historical prequel in that it focuses on the colonies and territories that would later make up the United States. As such the criteria will be similar and different in several respects.

== Key ==
Colonial victory (15)
Another result (4) (Note: A treaty or peace without a clear result, status quo ante bellum, result of civil or internal conflict, result unknown or indecisive, inconclusive.)
Colonial defeat (1)

== 18th century wars ==
Conflict	Allies	Opponent(s)	Result	British monarchs
Queen Anne's War (2nd Intercolonial War) (1702–1713) Part of the War of the Spanish Succession and the Indian Wars Location: North America New French raid on Deerfield, Massachusetts, in February 1704	England (before 1707): English America; Great Britain (after 1707): British America; Muscogee (Creek); Chickasaw; Yamasee Iroquois Confederacy Remained largely neutral, but participated on both sides	France: New France; Spain loyal to Philip V: New Spain; Wabanaki Confederacy; Caughnawaga Mohawk; Choctaw; Timucua; Apalachee; Natchez Iroquois Confederacy Remained largely neutral, but participated on both sides	Colonial/British Victory British victory over French in Canada. Spanish Empire in the Americas remains intact.: Treaty of Utrecht; Treaty of Portsmouth (1713)	Anne; English monarch (March 8, 1702 – May 1, 1707); British monarch (May 1, 1707 – August 1, 1714)
Cary's Rebellion (1711) Location: Province of Carolina	Province of Carolina Colony of Virginia Royal Marines	English Dissenters/Rebels	Colonial Victory: Province of Carolina split into the Province of North Carolina and the Province of South Carolina; Edward Hyde becomes first governor of North Carolina; Deputy Governor Thomas Carry arrested and sent to London; Quaker governance of North Carolina ended and excluded from provincial politics	Anne; English monarch (March 8, 1702 – May 1, 1707); British monarch (May 1, 1707 – August 1, 1714)
Tuscarora War (1711–1715) Part of the American Indian Wars Location: Eastern North Carolina The execution of John Lawson on September 16, 1711.	North Carolina; South Carolina; Apalachee; Catawba; Cherokee; Yamasee	Tuscarora; Coree; Cothechney; Machapunga; Mattamuskeet; Neusiok; Pamlico; Seneca; Weetock	Colonial Victory: Tuscaroras migrate to New York and join the Iroquois Confederacy; Native American enslavement began to decline, while African American enslavement began to increase	Anne; English monarch (March 8, 1702 – May 1, 1707); British monarch (May 1, 1707 – August 1, 1714) George I (August 1, 1714 – June 11, 1727)
Yamasee War (1715–1717) Part of the American Indian Wars Location: eastern Province of South Carolina	Colonial militia of South Carolina; Colonial militia of North Carolina; Colonial militia of Virginia; Catawba (from 1715); Cherokee (from 1716)	Yamasee; Ochese Creeks; Catawba (until 1715); Cherokee (until 1716); Waxhaw; Santee	Colonial Victory: Power of the Yamasee broken; South Carolina colonists establish uncontested control of the coast; The Catawba become the dominant tribe in the interior; Native American enslavement began to decline, while African American enslavement began to increase	George I (August 1, 1714 – June 11, 1727)
Battle of Cape Fear River (1718) Part of Piracy in the Caribbean and the Golden Age of Piracy Location: Cape Fear River, North Carolina Print engraving of Stede Bonnet with a Jolly Roger in Charles Johnson's A General History of the Pyrates (1724)	South Carolina	Pirates	Colonial Victory: Stede Bonnet's Pirate fleet captured; Stede Bonnet later escaped, was recaptured, and executed	George I (August 1, 1714 – June 11, 1727)
Battle of Ocracoke (1718) Part of Piracy in the Caribbean and the Golden Age of Piracy Location: Ocracoke Island, Province of North Carolina Capture of the Pirate, Blackbeard, 1718 depicting the battle between Blackbeard the Pirate and Lieutenant Maynard in Ocracoke Bay	Great Britain (Note: The Hunt for Blackbeard was propagated by Governor Alexander Spotswood of the Colony of Virginia.)	Pirates	Colonial/British Victory: Blackbeard is killed and beheaded ending his reign of terror on the British colonies	George I (August 1, 1714 – June 11, 1727)
Chickasaw Wars (1721–1763) Part of the American Indian Wars Location: East Arkansas, West Tennessee and Northeast Mississippi A 1711 map illustrating the position of British-aligned Chickasaw in Mississippi Delta	Great Britain; Chickasaw	France; Choctaw; Quapaw; Illinois Confederation	Colonial/Chickasaw Victory: Chickasaw wage a series of successful guerrilla wars against their French and Native Allies; Hostilities end between the Chickasaw following the end of the French and Indian War; Chickasaw numbers greatly reduced	George I (August 1, 1714 – June 11, 1727) George II (June 11, 1727 – October 25, 1760) George III (October 25, 1760 – January 29, 1820)
Dummer's War (1722–1725) Part of the American Indian Wars Location: Northern New England and Nova Scotia Battle of Norridgewock (1724): Death of Father Sébastien Rale of the Society of Jesus	New England; Mohawk	Wabanaki Confederacy; Abenaki; Pequawket; Mi'kmaq; Maliseet	Colonial Victory: American Indian population reduced along the Kennebec and Penobscot Rivers; Western Maine came more strongly under British control	George I (August 1, 1714 – June 11, 1727)
Cresap's War (1730-1767) Location: Pennsylvania–Maryland border	Colony of Pennsylvania	Colony of Maryland	Inconclusive/Other Result: Hostilities end in 1738; Mason-Dixon Line established; Maryland and Pennsylvania borders established; The cultural American North and South unofficially divided	George II (June 11, 1727 – October 25, 1760) George III (October 25, 1760 – January 29, 1820)
Colonial British Incursion into Spanish Florida [Siege of St. Augustine (1740), Siege of Fort Mose] (1740) Part of War of Jenkins' Ear and the Spanish Alarm	Great Britain; Province of Georgia	Spain	Spanish Victory: Colonial/British forces repulsed	George II (June 11, 1727 – October 25, 1760)
Invasion of Georgia (1742) Part of War of Jenkins' Ear and the Spanish Alarm Location: St. Simons Island, Province of Georgia Map depicting the invasion and the Battles of Bloody Marsh and Gully Hole Creek on St. Simons Island.	Great Britain Province of Georgia Native America allies	Spain	Colonial/British Victory: Spanish Invasion repulsed; Treaty of Aix-la-Chapelle (1748) recognised the status of Georgia as a British colony	George II (June 11, 1727 – October 25, 1760)
Battle of Galudoghson (1742) Location: Western Colony of Virginia	Colony of Virginia	Onondaga Oneida (both Iroquois)	Inconclusive/Other Result: Both sides withdraw; Later treaty of Lancaster	George II (June 11, 1727 – October 25, 1760)
Brunswick Town raid (1748) Part of War of Jenkins' Ear and the Spanish Alarm Location: Brunswick Town, Province of North Carolina Mosaic depicting the Spanish Attack created by Claude Howell	Great Britain: North Carolina	Spain (Privateers)	Colonial Victory: Spanish Privateers and Booty captured; Privateer survivors sold into slavery; Brunswick Town became one of the richest towns in British North America	George II (June 11, 1727 – October 25, 1760)
King George's War (3rd Intercolonial War) (1744–1748) Part of the War of Austrian Succession and the American Indian Wars Location: North America French and Mi'kmaq Battle of Grand Pré, February 1747	Great Britain: British America; Iroquois Confederacy	France: New France; Wabanaki Confederacy	Inconclusive/Other Result: Treaty of Aix-la-Chapelle; Tensions near the end of the war set the ground work for Father Le Loutre's War	George II (June 11, 1727 – October 25, 1760)
Father Le Loutre's War (1749–1755) Part of the French and Indian War and the American Indian Wars Location: Acadia and Nova Scotia Soldier of the 29th Regiment of Foot guarding the construction of Halifax against raids by Acadian and Mi'kmaq militia, 1749. Horsemans Fort stands in the background.^{t}	Great Britain: British America	France: New France; Acadian militia; Wabanakia; Mi'kmaq militia; Maliseet militia	Colonial Victory: The end of the war marks and overlap into the French and Indian War in its final year; Total War begins in the French and Indian War; Following the Battle of Fort Beauséjour the Expulsion of the Acadians began	George II (June 11, 1727 – October 25, 1760)
French and Indian War (4th Intercolonial War) (1754–1763) Part of the Seven Years' War, the Sixty Years' War, and the American Indian Wars Location: North America Washington the Soldier by Reǵnier (1834), depicting Lt. Col. George Washington on horseback during the battle of the Wilderness during the Braddock expedition. Washington took over command after British General George Braddock was shot during Franco/Native American ambush.	Great Britain: British America; Iroquois Confederacy; Wyandot of Ohio Country; Catawba; Cherokee Nation (before 1758); Mingo (briefly)	France: New France; Wabanaki Confederacy: Abenaki; Mi'kmaw militia; Algonquin; Lenape; Ojibwa; Ottawa; Shawnee; Wyandot of Fort Detroit	Colonial Victory: Treaty of Paris (1763); Royal Proclamation of 1763 (Recognition of Aboriginal title, Moratorium on Westward expansion into the Ohio Country, and Colonial subjects left disgruntled.); France cedes New France east of the Mississippi River to Great Britain, retaining Saint Pierre and Miquelon, and transfers Louisiana to Spain.; The Expulsion of the Acadians is completed; War doubled Great Britain's national debt gradually leading to increased regulation and taxation on Colonial British Subjects eventually contributing to the American Revolution	George II (June 11, 1727 – October 25, 1760) George III (October 25, 1760 – January 29, 1820)
Anglo-Cherokee War (1758-1761) Part of the French and Indian War Location: Province of North Carolina and Province of South Carolina After the Anglo-Cherokee War, bitterness remained between the two groups. In 1762, Henry Timberlake took three of the former Cherokee adversaries to London to help cement the newly declared friendship	Great Britain: Province of North Carolina; Province of South Carolina	Cherokee	Colonial/British Victory: Treaty of Long Island on the Holston 1761; Treaty of Charlestown 1761; Timberlake Expedition; Timberlake's take 3 Cherokee delegates on a tour of London many colonists viewed this as favoritism to the Natives and with the Royal Proclamation of 1763 helped lead to colonial discontent that would help lead to the American Revolution	George II (June 11, 1727 – October 25, 1760) George III (October 25, 1760 – January 29, 1820)
Pontiac's War (1763–1766) Part of the American Indian Wars and a continuation of the French and Indian War Location: Great Lakes region of North America n a famous council on April 27, 1763, Pontiac urged listeners rise up against the British. 19th century engraving by Alfred Bobbett.	Province of Pennsylvania Province of Quebec including the Illinois Country	Native American Coalition: Odawa Anishinaabek; Potawatomi Anishinaabek; Ojibwe Anishinaabek; Mingo people; Seneca people; Wyandot people; Miami people; Kickapoo people; Illinois people	Inconclusive/Other Result: American Indians were not able to force out the British and the British were not able to conquer the American Indians; Royal Proclamation of 1763; Indian Reserve (1763) established	George III (October 25, 1760 – January 29, 1820)
War of the Regulation (1766–1771) Part of the Regulator Movement Location: Central North Carolina Illustration of the Battle of Alamance by J. Steeple Davis	North Carolina	Regulators	Colonial Government Victory: Rebellion crushed; Survivors were either forced to sign loyalty oaths, had their houses burned, or fled to the West in exile; This war was a predecessor to the American Revolution	George III (October 25, 1760 – January 29, 1820)
Lord Dunmore's War (1774) Part of the American Indian Wars Location: Ohio Country Battle of Point Pleasant, by John Frost	Colony of Virginia	Shawnees; Mingos	Colonial Victory: Treaty of Camp Charlotte; Native Americans surrendered their hunting rights south of the Ohio; the American Revolution reignited the war initiating the Cherokee-American wars	George III (October 25, 1760 – January 29, 1820)

== See also ==
- Colonial American military history
- List of incidents of civil unrest in Colonial North America
- British America
- Colonial history of the United States
- New Netherland settlements
- French and Indian Wars
- British colonization of the Americas
- Culpeper's Rebellion
- Josias Fendall#Fendall's Rebellion
- 1689 Boston revolt
- Leisler's Rebellion
- Gove's Rebellion
- Pennamite–Yankee War
- The Black Boys rebellion
- Charter Oak#Incident
- Timeline of the American Revolution
- New Sweden
- New Spain
- Russian colonization of North America
- Scottish colonization of the Americas
- Danish colonization of the Americas
- Curonian colonization of the Americas
- Hospitaller colonization of the Americas
- Saint Thomas (Brandenburg colony)
- Slave rebellion and resistance in the United States
- Military history of the Acadians
- List of conflicts in British America
- Anglo-Spanish War (1585–1604)
- New Holland (Acadia)
- Sixty Years' War
- Raid on Newfoundland (1665)
- Vermont Republic
- Calendar (New Style) Act 1750#
- Capture of the sloop Ranger
- German colonization of the Americas

== Notes ==
Criteria for inclusion on these lists
1. Being that rebellions were much more common in this area, produced a great loss of life per capita in the region where they were fought, and were more geopolitically significant, rebellions are allowed to be included in this list, with the exception of slave rebellions. However, bloodless rebellions will not be included unless there is a change in territory, but all other rebellions can be linked in the see also section. Riots such as the Boston Massacre or the Knowles Riot and/or vigilantism such the burning of the Peggy Stewart or the Boston Tea Party should likewise not be included. If it can be established that a North American based anti piracy campaign can be established this may be included.
2. Extended wars focusing on European or other non British North American colonies should only be included if a successor colony or territory is included in some way or affected a colony. For example, the Nine Years' War should not be included, but King William's War should be included as it is the portion of the war that focuses on the North America theater.
3. Colonial Wars not including the 13 British Colonies and/or territories that became the United States should generally not be included especially if there was no British involvement. For example conflicts such as the Dutch Conquest of New Sweden should not be included, though they may be referenced in the see also section.
