= List of wars involving the United States in the 19th century =

List of wars involving the United States in the 19th century may refer to:

- List of wars involving the United States in the 19th century (1801-1850)
- List of wars involving the United States in the 19th century (1851-1900)
