= List of 17th-century wars involving the Thirteen Colonies =

This list of Colonial American Wars includes military conflicts involving the Thirteen Colonies and their predecessor colonies from 1609 to 1700. It covers the colonies that joined them prior to their Independence in 1776 (for example the Plymouth Colony merged with Massachusetts Bay Colony in 1691 and the Saybrook Colony merged with Connecticut Colony in 1644). These would include the New England Colonies, Chesapeake Colonies, Middle Colonies, and the Southern Colonies, as well as in the British-controlled Ohio Country and Illinois Country.

There are 18 military conflicts in this list, excluded are all conflicts involving other British territories in British America that did not become part of the United States.

This list is part of a larger series of list articles that cover the various wars involving the United States from its colonial roots to the present. They are:

- Lists of wars involving the United States
  - List of 17th-century wars involving the Thirteen Colonies (1609–1700)
  - List of 18th-century wars involving the Thirteen Colonies (1701–1774)
  - List of wars involving the United States in the 18th century (1775–1800)
  - List of wars involving the United States in the 19th century (1801-1850)
  - List of wars involving the United States in the 19th century (1851-1900)
  - List of wars involving the United States in the 20th century (1901–2000)
  - List of wars involving the United States in the 21st century (2001–present)

While this list is related to the wars involving the United States, it serves as a historical prequel in that it focuses on the colonies and territories that would later make up the United States. As such the criteria will be similar and different in several respects.

== Key ==
Colonial victory (10)
Another result (3) (Note: A treaty or peace without a clear result, status quo ante bellum, result of civil or internal conflict, result unknown or indecisive, inconclusive.)
Colonial defeat (5)

== 17th century wars ==
Conflict	Allies	Opponent(s)	Result	English monarchs
First Anglo-Powhatan War (1609–1614) Part of the Anglo-Powhatan Wars and American Indian Wars Location: Colony of Virginia Current location in the United States: Virginia Pocahontas saving the life of Capt. John Smith, December 1607.	Colony of Virginia	Powhatan Confederacy	Colonial Victory: Peace of Pocahontas; Several native tribes disappear from the historical record; Powhatan confederacy became tributaries to the King of England	James I (March 24, 1603 – March 27, 1625)
Samuel Argall's raid on Acadia (1613) Location: Acadia Current location in the United States: Maine Fire at Port-Royal following Samuel Argall's attack in 1613.	Virginia Company	Acadia Colony	Colonial Victory: Towns in Acadia successfully raided; Prisoners Taken	James I (March 24, 1603 – March 27, 1625)
Second Anglo-Powhatan War (1622–1632) Part of the Anglo-Powhatan Wars and American Indian Wars Location: Colony of Virginia Current location in the United States: Virginia Massacre of Jamestown and outlying Virginia settlements by the Powhatan Indians, March 1622.	Colony of Virginia	Powhatan Confederacy	Colonial Victory: The 1632 Peace Treaty & Land Seizure; End of the Virginia Company	James I (March 24, 1603 – March 27, 1625) Charles I (March 27, 1625 – January 30, 1649)
Pequot War (1636–1638) Part of the American Indian Wars Location: New England Colonies Current locations in the United States: Connecticut, Rhode Island and New York A 19th-century engraving depicting an incident in the Pequot War	Massachusetts Bay Colony; Plymouth Colony; Saybrook Colony; Connecticut Colony; Narragansett; Mohegans	Pequot tribe Western Niantic people	Colonial Victory: Mystic massacre; Treaty of Hartford (1638)	Charles I (March 27, 1625 – January 30, 1649)
Acadian Civil War (1635–1654) Location: Acadia Current location in the United States: Maine Siege of Saint John (1645) – d'Aulnay defeats La Tour in Acadia	St. John Administration; Supported by: Massachusetts Bay Colony	Port Royal Administration; Supported by: Catholic Church	Port Royal temporary victory: La Tour expelled by d'Aulnay; La Tour later marries d'Aulnay's widow Jeanne Motin & resumes Governorship	Charles I (March 27, 1625 – January 30, 1649) No monarch (January 30, 1649 – May 29, 1660)
Third Anglo-Powhatan War (1644–1646) Part of the Anglo-Powhatan Wars and American Indian Wars Location: Colony of Virginia Current location in the United States: Virginia Opechancanough, the paramount chief of the Powhatan Confederacy, was killed by a prison guard while in English custody at Jamestown, 1646.	Colony of Virginia	Powhatan Confederacy	Colonial Victory: Collapse of the Powhatan Confederacy; Remaining Powhatan tribes reduced to tributary vassals	Charles I (March 27, 1625 – January 30, 1649)
Claiborne and Ingle's Rebellion (1644–1646) Part of the English Civil War and Protestant Revolution of Maryland Location: Province of Maryland Current location in the United States: Maryland	Maryland Catholics Maryland proprietary colonial militia	Maryland Puritans Puritan privateers (pirates) outlaws	Colonial Victory: With the end of hostilities, the Maryland colonial assembly issued the Maryland Toleration Act of 1649 to allow religious freedom for Catholics to worship in the colony.	Charles I (March 27, 1625 – January 30, 1649)
English Invasion of Acadia (1654) Location: Acadia Current location in the United States: Maine	Commonwealth of England; New England Confederation	France/New France	English Victory: Acadia becomes a colony from 1654 to 1667	No monarch (January 30, 1649 – May 29, 1660)
Battle of the Severn (1655) Part of the Wars of the Three Kingdoms Location: Province of Maryland Current location in the United States: Maryland The Battle of the Mouth of the Severn, March 1655.	Commonwealth supporters (primarily Puritan settlers)	Lord Baltimore's supporters (Royalist, non Puritan Protestant, and Catholic settlers)	Commissioners/ Puritan Victory/ Other Result: Both Commissioners and Stone Claimed jurisdiction over the Province of Maryland; Governor Stone Removed from contested power; Ultimately Lord Baltimore Retains power and religious freedom was proclaimed in the Providence	No monarch (January 30, 1649 – May 29, 1660)
Battle of Bloody Run (1656) Part of the American Indian Wars and the Beaver Wars Location: Colony of Virginia Current location in the United States: Virginia	Colony of Virginia Pamunkey tribe	Unknown Iroquois tribe (possibly, Mahocks and Nahyssans or Richahecrians)	Colonial Defeat: Pamunkey allies abandoned; Chief Totopotomoi killed; Nearly all of the Pamunkey warriors and many Colonial Rangers killed; Colonel Edward Hill stripped of his rank; Having felt betrayed the Pamunkey would only send a token force to aid Virginia against native raids prior to Bacon's Rebellion	No monarch (January 30, 1649 – May 29, 1660)
Conquest of New Netherland (1664) Part of the Second Anglo-Dutch War Location: New Amsterdam, New Netherland Current location in the United States: New York The Fall of New Amsterdam, 1664.	England	Dutch Republic	English/Colonial Victory: Surrender of New Netherland; Start of the Second Anglo-Dutch War; Province of New York created; Subsequent Revolt of the Long Swede in 1669 by Swedish Settlers loyal to New Sweden	Charles II (May 29, 1660 – February 6, 1685)
First Battle of the James River (1667) Part of the Second Anglo-Dutch War Location: Colony of Virginia Current location in the United States: Virginia Dutch portrait of the prow of an English ship Elizabeth, burned during the battle, 1667.	England; Colony of Virginia	Dutch Republic	Dutch victory: Using an English flag ruse, a Dutch squadron sailed up the James River, sank the English warship Elizabeth, captured 19 merchant ships (burning two), and seized massive quantities of tobacco before returning home	Charles II (May 29, 1660 – February 6, 1685)
Dutch Raid on North America (1672–1674) Part of the Franco-Dutch War and the Third Anglo-Dutch War Location: Province of New York and Colony of Virginia Current location in the United States: New York and Virginia New York was called The City of New Orange from 1673 to 1674. Brief name change occurred when the Dutch forces temporarily recaptured the city from the English during the Third Anglo-Dutch War.	England; Colony of Virginia; New England Confederation	Dutch Republic	Dutch victory: Second Battle of the James River in 1673; Dutch briefly reconquer New Netherland (1673-1674); Peace Treaty of Westminster in 1674	Charles II (May 29, 1660 – February 6, 1685)
Chowanoc War (1675–1677) Part of the American Indian Wars Location: Albemarle County, Province of Carolina Current location in the United States: North Carolina	Province of Carolina	Chowanocs	Colonial Victory: Forced relocation and reservation of Chowanoc people; Culpeper's Rebellion	Charles II (May 29, 1660 – February 6, 1685)
King Philip's War (1675–1678) Part of the American Indian Wars Location: New England Colonies Current locations in the United States: Connecticut, Maine, Massachusetts, New Hampshire, Rhode Island New England settlers defending a garrison house from attack by Indians.	New England Confederation Mohegans Pequots Mohawks	Wampanoags Nipmucs Podunks Narragansetts Nashaway Wabanaki Confederacy	Partial Colonial Victory: New England Confederation Victory South of Maine; Wabanaki Confederacy Victory in Maine	Charles II (May 29, 1660 – February 6, 1685)
Bacon's Rebellion (1676–1677) Part of the American Indian Wars and the Slave Rebellions in North America Location: Colony of Virginia Current location in the United States: Virginia The Burning of Jamestown during Bacon's Rebellion, 1676.	Colony of Virginia Various Native American tribes	Rebels; Indentured Servants Slaves	Colonial Victory: Rebellion suppressed; Mass executions of the rebellion's leaders; Governor William Berkley recalled to England; Hundreds of Natives killed	Charles II (May 29, 1660 – February 6, 1685)
King William's War (First Intercolonial War) (1688–1697) Part of the Nine Years' War and the Indian Wars Location: North America Current locations in the United States: Connecticut, Maine, Massachusetts, New Hampshire, New York French and Indian raiders prepares to attack Schenectady, guarded by two snowmen, 1690.	England: New England; New York; Iroquoia; Mohicans	France: New France; Wabanakia; Algonquin; Kahnawake	Inconclusive/Other Result: Peace of Ryswick; Status quo ante bellum	James II (February 6, 1685 – December 23, 1688) Mary II (February 13 1689 – December 28, 1694) William III (February 13, 1689 – March 8 1702)
Protestant Revolution (1689–1692) Part of the Glorious Revolution Location: Province of Maryland Current location in the United States: Maryland	Province of Maryland	Protestant Associators	Associator victory: John Coode takes over as Governor of the Province of Maryland; William Joseph deposed as Governor; The Calvert family deposed as Lord proprietors of Maryland giving direct rule to the Crown; Catholicism is outlawed in Maryland and would not be restored until after the signing of the United States Declaration of Independence; The Church of England becomes the official Church of Maryland	Mary II (February 13, 1689 - December 28, 1694) William III (February 13, 1689 – March 8 1702)

== See also ==
- Colonial American military history
- List of incidents of civil unrest in Colonial North America
- British America
- Colonial history of the United States
- New Netherland settlements
- French and Indian Wars
- British colonization of the Americas
- Culpeper's Rebellion
- Josias Fendall#Fendall's Rebellion
- 1689 Boston revolt
- Leisler's Rebellion
- Gove's Rebellion
- Pennamite–Yankee War
- The Black Boys rebellion
- Charter Oak#Incident
- Timeline of the American Revolution
- New Sweden
- New Spain
- Russian colonization of North America
- Scottish colonization of the Americas
- Danish colonization of the Americas
- Curonian colonization of the Americas
- Hospitaller colonization of the Americas
- Saint Thomas (Brandenburg colony)
- Slave rebellion and resistance in the United States
- Military history of the Acadians
- List of conflicts in British America
- Anglo-Spanish War (1585–1604)
- New Holland (Acadia)
- Sixty Years' War
- Raid on Newfoundland (1665)
- Vermont Republic
- Calendar (New Style) Act 1750#
- Action of 17 July 1628
- Surrender of Quebec
- German colonization of the Americas

== Notes ==
Criteria for inclusion on these lists
1. Being that rebellions were much more common in this area, produced a great loss of life per capita in the region where they were fought, and were more geopolitically significant, rebellions are allowed to be included in this list, with the exception of slave rebellions. However, bloodless rebellions will not be included unless there is a change in territory, but all other rebellions can be linked in the see also section. Riots such as the Boston Massacre or the Knowles Riot and/or vigilantism such the burning of the Peggy Stewart or the Boston Tea Party should likewise not be included. If it can be established that a North American based anti piracy campaign can be established this may be included.
2. Extended wars focusing on European or other non British North American colonies should only be included if a successor colony or territory is included in some way or affected a colony. For example, the Nine Years' War should not be included, but King William's War should be included as it is the portion of the war that focuses on the North America theater.
3. Colonial Wars not including the 13 British Colonies and/or territories that became the United States should generally not be included especially if there was no British involvement. For example conflicts such as the Dutch Conquest of New Sweden should not be included, though they may be referenced in the see also section.
