= List of colonial American wars =

List of colonial American wars could refer to:

- List of 17th-century wars involving the Thirteen Colonies
- List of 18th-century wars involving the Thirteen Colonies
