= List of wars involving the United States in the 19th century (1801-1850) =

This is a list of military conflicts, that United States has been involved in the 19th century from 1801 to 1850.

This list is part of a larger series of list articles that cover the various wars involving the United States from its colonial roots to the present. They are:

- Lists of wars involving the United States
  - List of 17th-century wars involving the Thirteen Colonies (1609–1700)
  - List of 18th-century wars involving the Thirteen Colonies (1701–1774)
  - List of wars involving the United States in the 18th century (1775–1800)
  - List of wars involving the United States in the 19th century (1801-1850)
  - List of wars involving the United States in the 19th century (1851-1900)
  - List of wars involving the United States in the 20th century (1901–2000)
  - List of wars involving the United States in the 21st century (2001–present)

For the criteria of what may be permitted on this list, see Lists of wars involving the United States.

== Key ==
US victory (28)
Another result (7) (Note: A treaty or peace without a clear result, status quo ante bellum, result of civil or internal conflict, result unknown or indecisive, inconclusive.)
US defeat (3)

== 19th-century wars ==
| Conflict | Allies | Opponent(s) | Result | President(s) |
|---|---|---|---|---|
| First Barbary War (1801–1805) Part of the Barbary Wars Location: Mediterranean Sea off the coast of Tripoli Lieutenant Presley O'Bannon at Derna, April 1805 | United States; Sweden; Kingdom of Sicily (United Kingdom) Malta Protectorate; Kingdom of Portugal; Sultanate of Morocco | Ottoman Tripolitania; Sultanate of Morocco | US-allied victory: Attacks on American shipping; Crews taken prisoner for ransom; Tripoli declares war on the US; US Naval Blockade on Tripoli; Raids and naval battles with Tripolitanian ships; First Battle of Tripoli Harbor; Second Battle of Tripoli Harbor; Philadelphia and Intrepid blown up, Somers and James Decatur killed; Marines and mercenaries led by William Eaton attack Derna; Battle of Derna won by the US; Tripoli surrenders; Hostages released | Thomas Jefferson (March 4, 1801 – March 4, 1809) |
| Lewis and Clark Expedition (1804–1806) Location: Near the Marias River, Montana Depiction of Meriwether Lewis, shooting a Piegan Blackfoot Indian near Two Medicine River. On July 26, 1806 on the return trip of the expedition Lewis and his men encountered Piegans attempting to steal their weapons and horses while they slept. Lewis shot one and Reubin Field stabbed another. The party then fled the area. | United States | Blackfeet Nation | US victory: Horse theft prevented; Meriwether Lewis and his men escape Montana Blackfeet territory; Army Corps of Discovery dissolved | Thomas Jefferson (March 4, 1801 – March 4, 1809) |
| Chesapeake–Leopard affair (1807) Part of the events leading to the War of 1812 Location: off Norfolk, Virginia HMS Leopard (right) fires upon USS Chesapeake. Drawn by Fred S. Cozzens and published in 1897. | United States | United Kingdom | British victory: The USS Chesapeake was boarded and 4 of her crew impressed into British service.; Heightened tensions between the British and the Americans; President Jefferson later pushes forward the Embargo Act of 1807 in response to the affair | Thomas Jefferson (March 4, 1801 – March 4, 1809) |
| Tecumseh's War (1810–1813) Part of the Seminole Wars and the War of 1812 Location: Northwest River Ohio The Battle of Tippecanoe | United States | Tecumseh's Confederacy List: Shawnee; Red Sticks; Ojibway; Chickamauga; Meskwaki; Iroquois; Miami; Mingo; Odawa; Kickapoo; Lenape; Mascouten; Potawatomi; Sauk; Wyandot | US victory: Death of Tecumseh; Dissolution of Tecumseh's confederacy; Full annexation and further settlement of the Mid West; Beginning of the border arrangements between United States and Canada | James Madison (March 4, 1809 – March 4, 1817) |
| U.S. Annexation of the Republic of West Florida (1810) Part of Decline of Spain Location: Modern day Florida Parishes, Louisiana | United States | Republic of West Florida (American filibusters) | US victory: US annexes West Florida; James Madison proclaimed a specific interpretation of the Louisiana Purchase and Third Treaty of San Ildefonso to justify annexation as opposed to recognizing the territory as Spain's | James Madison (March 4, 1809 – March 4, 1817) |
| Little Belt affair (1811) Part of the events leading to the War of 1812 Location: Off the North Carolina, Atlantic Ocean American Frigate USS President and the Sloop the HMS Little Belt engage in battle. | United States | United Kingdom | US victory: Successful retaliation for the impressment of John Diggio captured onboard the USS Spitfire (1803) by the HMS Guerriere (1806); Heightened tensions between the British and the Americans | James Madison (March 4, 1809 – March 4, 1817) |
| Battle of Woody Point (1811) Part of American Indian Wars and Maritime fur trade Location: Clayoquot Sound, off Woody Point, Vancouver Island, British Columbia, Canada The Tonquin being attacked off the shore of Vancouver Island in 1811. | United States: Merchant Marines | Nuu-chah-nulth | Inconclusive/Other Result: All the crew killed or captured and killed except one; Tonquin exploded in a suicide bombing by a critically injured crewman; 61-200 Natives killed and failed to capture any supplies on the Tonquin | James Madison (March 4, 1809 – March 4, 1817) |
| Patriot War (Florida) (1812–1814) Part of War of 1812, Decline of Spain, the American Indian Wars, and Seminole Wars Location: Amelia Island, Spanish East Florida | United States (Till 1813); Republic of East Florida (American filibusters, dubbed the Patriots) | (Spanish Empire) Spanish Empire; Seminole; Seminole Maroons | American/Filibuster Defeat: US abandon filibuster allies for fear of expanded conflict with Spain; Buckner F. Harris killed; Remaining filibusters abandon Republic of East Florida | James Madison (March 4, 1809 – March 4, 1817) |
| War of 1812 (1812–1815) Location: Eastern and Central North America General Andrew Jackson stands on the parapet of his makeshift defenses as his troops repulse attacking Highlanders, by painter Edward Percy Moran in 1910. | United States; Choctaw Nation; Cherokee Nation; Creek Allies Baratarian Pirates led by Jean and Pierre Lafitte (Note: The Baratarian only fought during the time of the Battle of New Orleans in exchange for pardons.) | United Kingdom: (British Empire) British North America; The Canadas; (Switzerland) Swiss Mercenaries (The Regiment de Meuron and De Watteville's Regiment); Tecumseh's Confederacy List: Shawnee; Red Sticks; Ojibway; Chickamauga; Meskwaki; Iroquois; Miami; Mingo; Odawa; Kickapoo; Lenape; Mascouten; Potawatomi; Sauk; Wyandot; Spanish Empire (1814) | Inconclusive/Other Result: Treaty of Ghent; Military stalemate; both sides' invasion attempts repulsed; Status quo ante bellum; Tecumseh's Confederacy Disbanded; York sacked by American troops, destroying the original Canadian parliament.; Commonwealth troops commit the burning of Washington including the White House and the Capitol; Spanish control over West Florida weakened and Mobile comes under American control | James Madison (March 4, 1809 – March 4, 1817) |
| Creek War (1813–1814) Part of the American Indian Wars and the War of 1812 Location: Southern United States The Battle of Horseshoe Bend, 1814 | United States; Lower Creeks; Cherokee Nation; Choctaw Nation | Red Stick Creek Supported by: United Kingdom; Spain; Tecumseh's Confederacy | US-allied victory: Treaty of Fort Jackson; Red Sticks cede land in the states of Georgia and Alabama; Surviving Red Sticks fled to Spanish Florida | James Madison (March 4, 1809 – March 4, 1817) |
| Nuku Hiva Campaign (1813–1814) Part of the War of 1812 Location: Nuku Hiva, Marquesas Islands | United States | Tai Pi Happah (October 1813) Te I'i (May 1814) | US tactical victory: Tai Pis and Happahs defeated; Polynesian strategic victory: Fort Madison destroyed and Nuku Hiva abandoned by May 1814 | James Madison (March 4, 1809 – March 4, 1817) |
| West Indies anti-piracy operations of the United States (1814–1825) Part of Piracy in the Caribbean Location: West Indies, Caribbean Sea, Gulf of Mexico On 8 April 1823, the barges USS Mosquito and USS Gallinipper chased the pirate schooner, Pilot, off Havana, Cuba. Driving the vessel ashore, the ensuing battle resulted in two pirate fatalities and with one being captured. The other pirates escaped on shore where Marines landed to pursue them. The engagement was supported by sloop-of-war Peacock. | United States; United Kingdom; Denmark; Spain | Caribbean Pirates | US-allied victory: With the Capture of the sloop Anne and the trial and arrest and execution of Roberto Cofresí classical Caribbean piracy ended | James Madison (March 4, 1809 – March 4, 1817) James Monroe (March 4, 1817 – March 4, 1825) John Quincy Adams (March 4, 1825 – March 4, 1829) |
| Second Barbary War (1815) Part of the Barbary Wars Location: Mediterranean Sea and the Barbary States Decatur's squadron off Algiers | United States | Deylik of Algiers | US victory: End of yearly American tribute to the Barbary states; Algiers pays $10,000 to compensate for enslaved citizens and releases American captives; Treaties with Tunis and Tripoli force them to release European captives and respect American shipping; Further decline of Barbary pirate raids, fully concluded with the French Invasion of Algiers | James Madison (March 4, 1809 – March 4, 1817) |
| U.S. Conquest of the Republic of the Floridas during the Amelia Island Affair (1817) Part of the Decline of Spain and the Atlantic Revolutions Location: Amelia Island, Florida | United States | Republic of the Floridas (Insurgent privateer filibusters for the Patriot governments of Venezuela and New Granada) | US victory: US annexes Amelia Island | James Monroe (March 4, 1817 – March 4, 1825) |
| First Seminole War (1817–1818) Part of the Seminole Wars, the Decline of Spain, and the American Indian Wars Location: Pensacola, Spanish Florida Barracks and tents at Fort Brooke near Tampa Bay | United States | Seminole (Spain) Spanish Florida | US victory: Spain cedes Spanish Florida to the United States in the Adams–Onís Treaty of 1819; The United States forcibly relocates Seminole in northern Florida to a reservation in the center of the peninsula in the Treaty of Moultrie Creek of 1823 | James Monroe (March 4, 1817 – March 4, 1825) |
| Callao affair (1820) Part of Peruvian War of Independence Location: Callao, Peru, Pacific Ocean USS Macedonian in Ireland | United States | Spanish Empire | US defeat: Several Naval and Merchant Marine ships damaged; A few Sailors killed and wounded; Several American and British civilians robbed and escaped on the USS Macedonian as refugees; No significant response from the USA; Joaquín de la Pezuela the commander of the Spanish promised to punish the attackers | James Monroe (March 4, 1817 – March 4, 1825) |
| Arikara War (1823) Part of the American Indian Wars Location: Missouri River An Arikara warrior | United States Sioux | Arikara | Inconclusive/Other Result: White Peace treaty agreed by US Col Leavenworth | James Monroe (March 4, 1817 – March 4, 1825) |
| Aegean Sea anti-piracy operations of the United States (1825–1828) Part of the Greek War of Independence Location: Aegean Sea, Greece Greek pirates attacking the British merchant ship Comet (later to be liberated by the USS Porpoise during the Battle of Doro Passage). | United States | Greek Pirates | US victory: Pirate Threat Eliminated | John Quincy Adams (March 4, 1825 – March 4, 1829) |
| Winnebago War (1827) Part of the American Indian Wars Location: Illinois and Michigan Territory | United States; Choctaw Nation | Prairie La Crosse Ho-Chunks with a few allies | US-allied victory: Ho-Chunks cede lead mining region to the United States | John Quincy Adams (March 4, 1825 – March 4, 1829) |
| Falklands Expedition (1831–1832) Part of the Falkland Islands sovereignty dispute Location: Falkland Islands | United States | Argentine Confederation | US victory: Americans rescued; Suspects captured; Island evacuated; Temporary severing of Argentina–United States relations; Indirectly resulted in reassertion of British sovereignty over the Falkland Islands | Andrew Jackson (March 4, 1829 – March 4, 1837) |
| First Sumatran Expedition (1832) Part of the Sumatran expeditions Location: Kuala Batee, Aceh Sultanate, Island of Sumatra U.S. Infantry Attacking at the Battle of Quallah Battoo | United States | Chiefdom of Kuala Batee | US victory: Destruction of Kuala Batee; US pepper trade temporarily secured for 6 years | Andrew Jackson (March 4, 1829 – March 4, 1837) |
| Black Hawk War (1832) Part of the American Indian Wars and the Ute Wars Location: Illinois and Michigan Territory Native women and children fleeing the Battle of Bad Axe | United States; Ho-Chunk; Menominee; Dakota; Potawatomi | Black Hawk's British Band; Ho-Chunk and Potawatomi allies | US-allied victory: End of Native armed resistance to U.S. expansion in the Old Northwest; Black Hawk Purchase (1832); The United States purchases Potawatomi land in the Treaty of Tippecanoe (1832); The United States purchases the rest of Potawatomi land west of the Mississippi River in the Treaty of Chicago (1833) | Andrew Jackson (March 4, 1829 – March 4, 1837) |
| Second Seminole War (1835–1842) Part of the Seminole Wars and the American Indian Wars Location: Florida, United States U.S. Marines search for Seminoles in the Everglades | United States | Seminole | US victory: Approximately 3,800 Seminoles transported to the Indian Territory; Approximately 300 remain in Everglades | Andrew Jackson (March 4, 1829 – March 4, 1837) Martin Van Buren (March 4, 1837 – March 4, 1841) William Henry Harrison (March 4, 1841 – April 4, 1841) John Tyler (April 4, 1841 – March 4, 1845) |
| Texas Comanche Wars (1836–1875) Part of the Texas–Indian wars and the American Indian Wars Location: South-central United States (Texas, Oklahoma, New Mexico, Kansas, Colorado) and northern Mexico A group of U.S. soldiers defend themselves from Comanche warriors at the Battle of Buffalo Wallow | Republic of Texas; United States | Comanche | US victory: Comanche natives forced into reservations at the Indian Territory after the final Comanche forces surrendered at Fort Sill; American hunters exterminated most of the bison herds, taking away the Comanches primary source of food and clothing; Multiple Comanche villages destroyed and horses slaughtered, causing Comanche warriors to be greatly weakened; During the Civil War both Union and Confederate forces withdrew most of their troops to the east and left western forts across Texas and modern-day Oklahoma open to Comanche raids, letting them regroup and capture supplies, most notably at the Battle of Adobe Walls | Andrew Jackson (March 4, 1829 – March 4, 1837) Martin Van Buren (March 4, 1837 – March 4, 1841) William Henry Harrison (March 4, 1841 – April 4, 1841) John Tyler (April 4, 1841 – March 4, 1845) James K. Polk (March 4, 1845 – March 4, 1849) Zachary Taylor (March 4, 1849 – July 9, 1850) Millard Fillmore (July 9, 1850 – March 4, 1853) Franklin Pierce (March 4, 1853 – March 4, 1857) James Buchanan (March 4, 1857 – March 4, 1861) Abraham Lincoln (March 4, 1861 – April 15, 1865) Andrew Johnson (April 15, 1865 – March 4, 1869) Ulysses S. Grant (March 4, 1869 – March 4, 1877) |
| Patriot War (1838) Part of Rebellions of 1837–1838 and the Atlantic Revolutions Location: The Great Lakes Basin of the Canada–United States border Battle of the Windmill in which the United States Army and Navy participated in. | United States (United Kingdom) British Empire: Upper Canada | Republic of Canada Hunters' Lodge | Anglo-American victory: Act of Union 1840; Webster–Ashburton Treaty; Unification of Upper and Lower Canada into the Province of Canada and democratic reforms to lessen social unrest | Martin Van Buren (March 4, 1837 – March 4, 1841) |
| Second Sumatran Expedition (1838) Part of the Sumatran expeditions Location:Kuala Batee and Muckie, Aceh Sultanate, Island of Sumatra, Island of Sumatra Bombardment of Muckie | United States | Chiefdom of Kuala Batee Chiefdom of Muckie | US victory: 5 Muckie Forts and the Village of Muckie destroyed; Kuala Batee Bombarded; End of Piracy by Muckie and Kuala | Martin Van Buren (March 4, 1837 – March 4, 1841) |
| Aroostook War (1838-1839) Location: Maine-New Brunswick border Eastern disputed areas on the Canada-United States boundary. | United States: Maine | United Kingdom: Lower Canada; New Brunswick | Compromise: Webster–Ashburton Treaty; Bloodless war; 38 non-combatant deaths | Martin Van Buren (March 4, 1837 – March 4, 1841) |
| Punitive expeditions of the 1840 Fiji expedition Part of the United States Exploring Expedition and the Fiji expeditions Location: Fiji The Killing of Lieutenant Underwood and passed midshipman Wilkes Henry during the first day of the Battle of Malolo. | United States | Fijian tribes | US victory: 4 Fijian Villages destroyed; deaths of sailors avenged; the survivors of the villages of Sualib and Arro forced to give resources as reparations | Martin Van Buren (March 4, 1837 – March 4, 1841) |
| Bombardment of Upolu (1841) Part of the United States Exploring Expedition Location: Upolu, Samoa, Pacific Ocean A drawing of a Samoan village made in 1839 by Alfred Agate during the Wilkes Expedition. | United States | Samoa | US victory: 3 Villages destroyed; Several war canoes destroyed | Martin Van Buren (March 4, 1837 – March 4, 1841) |
| Battle of Drummond's Island (1841) Part of the United States Exploring Expedition Location:Drummond's Island, Gilbert Islands, (Modern Day Kiribati) Gilbertese warriors of Tabiteuea, with shark's teeth weapons. (Drawn by Alfred Agate) | United States | Micronesian Natives | US victory: 2 Native Villages Destroyed | John Tyler (April 4, 1841 – March 4, 1845) |
| Ivory Coast Expedition (1842) Part of the African Slave Trade Patrol and the Blockade of Africa Location: Ivory Coast, Liberia Veterans of the expedition on board Saratoga in 1842. | United States | Bereby | US victory: Death of Bereby king Ben Crack-O; 8 Villages (including Little Bereby) destroyed; American shipping and missionaries protected in the region | John Tyler (April 4, 1841 – March 4, 1845) |
| Capture of Monterey (1842) Location: Mexico (Modern day California) Commodore Jones' flagship USS United States | United States | Mexico | Inconclusive/Other Result: Status quo ante bellum; Americans leave the city after hearing the war did not break out | John Tyler (April 4, 1841 – March 4, 1845) |
| USS Congress incident (1844) Part of the Argentine Civil Wars, Platine War, Uruguayan Civil War, and the Great Siege of Montevideo Location: Río de la Plata, Uruguay USS Congress (1842-1862). | United States | Argentine Confederation | Status quo ante bellum: Argentine Ships temporarily seized; Maritime blocking of Montevideo resumed; Prosecution of Philip Voorhees | John Tyler (April 4, 1841– March 4, 1845) |
| Mexican–American War (1846–1848) Location: Texas, New Mexico, California and Mexico The Battle of Río San Gabriel, January 1847. | United States; California Republic | Mexico | US-allied victory: Treaty of Guadalupe Hidalgo; Mexican Cession; Territories of modern day Arizona and New Mexico ceded to the U.S. after the Gadsden Purchase in 1854; Mexican recognition of US sovereignty over Texas and California (among other territories) | James K. Polk (March 4, 1845 – March 4, 1849) |
| Cayuse War (1847–1855) Part of the American Indian Wars Location: Oregon The Whitman Massacre. | United States | Cayuse | US victory: Cayuse reduced in numbers and forced to cede most of their lands | James K. Polk (March 4, 1845 – March 4, 1849) Zachary Taylor (March 4, 1849 – July 9, 1850) Millard Fillmore (July 9, 1850 – March 4, 1853) Franklin Pierce (March 4, 1853 – March 4, 1857) |
| Apache Wars (1849–1924) Part of the Texas–Indian wars, Ute Wars, Apache–Mexico Wars, and the American Indian Wars Location: Southwestern United States U.S. Cavalry dash for cover while fighting Apaches, by F. Remington | United States | Apache; Ute; Yavapai Mexico | US victory: War with Mexico averted after the Crawford affair; Apaches moved to reservations | James K. Polk (March 4, 1845 – March 4, 1849) Zachary Taylor (March 4, 1849 – July 9, 1850) Millard Fillmore (July 9, 1850 – March 4, 1853) Franklin Pierce (March 4, 1853 – March 4, 1857) James Buchanan (March 4, 1857 – March 4, 1861) Abraham Lincoln (March 4, 1861 – April 15, 1865) Andrew Johnson (April 15, 1865 – March 4, 1869) Ulysses S. Grant (March 4, 1869 – March 4, 1877) Rutherford B. Hayes (March 4, 1877 – March 4, 1881) James A. Garfield (March 4, 1881 – September 19, 1881) Chester A. Arthur (September 19, 1881 – March 4, 1885) Grover Cleveland (March 4, 1885 – March 4, 1889) Benjamin Harrison (March 4, 1889 – March 4, 1893) Grover Cleveland (March 4, 1893 – March 4, 1897) William McKinley (March 4, 1897 – September 14, 1901) Theodore Roosevelt (September 14, 1901 – March 4, 1909) William Howard Taft (March 4, 1909 – March 4, 1913) Woodrow Wilson (March 4, 1913 – March 4, 1921) Warren G. Harding (March 4, 1921 – August 2, 1923) Calvin Coolidge (August 2, 1923 – March 4, 1929) |
| Navajo Wars (1849–1866) Part of the American Indian Wars Location: New Mexico Fort Defiance | United States | Navajo Nation | US victory: Long Walk of the Navajo; Navajos moved to reservations | James K. Polk (March 4, 1845 – March 4, 1849) Zachary Taylor (March 4, 1849 – July 9, 1850) Millard Fillmore (July 9, 1850 – March 4, 1853) Franklin Pierce (March 4, 1853 – March 4, 1857) James Buchanan (March 4, 1857 – March 4, 1861) Abraham Lincoln (March 4, 1861 – April 15, 1865) Andrew Johnson (April 15, 1865 – March 4, 1869) |
| California Indian Wars (1850–1887) Part of the American Indian Wars, the California Gold Rush, and the California Genocide Location: Sonora, Arizona, California Members of the Mariposa Battalion firing into an indigenous people encampment during a campaign in the Mariposa War | United States: California militia; Scalp hunters; American Pioneers; Gold miners; Cahuilla Mountain Band San Pasqual Kumeyaay | Yuma Mohave Cahuilla Los Coyotes Band Cupeño Mountain Kumeyaay Pomo Ahwahnechee Chauchela/Chowchilla Yokuts Wintu Tolowa Yuki Red Caps Achomawi Atsugewi Whilkut – "Wintoons" Chilula – "Redwoods" Hupa Chimariko Lassik Mattole Nongatl Sinkyone Tsnungwe Wailaki Southern Paiute Mono Shoshone Kawaiisu Tübatulabal Snake Indians Modoc | US Allied Native victory: California colonized; Native California Indians genocided; The Last Major Battles fought solely between Native Americans occurs concluding with the Battle of Pima Butte | James K. Polk (March 4, 1845 – March 4, 1849) Zachary Taylor (March 4, 1849 – July 9, 1850) Millard Fillmore (July 9, 1850 – March 4, 1853) Franklin Pierce (March 4, 1853 – March 4, 1857) James Buchanan (March 4, 1857 – March 4, 1861) Abraham Lincoln (March 4, 1861 – April 15, 1865) Andrew Johnson (April 15, 1865 – March 4, 1869) Ulysses S. Grant (March 4, 1869 – March 4, 1877) Rutherford B. Hayes (March 4, 1877 – March 4, 1881) |

== See also ==
- List of notable deployments of U.S. military forces overseas
- Timeline of United States military operations
- Military history of the United States
- United States Armed Forces
- List of American military installations
- List of United States drone bases
- Itata incident
