= List of wars involving the United States from the 18th and 19th centuries =

List of wars involving the United States from the 18th and 19th centuries could refer to:

- List of wars involving the United States in the 18th century
- List of wars involving the United States in the 19th century
