= List of wars involving the United States in the 19th century (1851-1900) =

This is a list of military conflicts, that United States has been involved in the 19th century from 1851 to 1900.

This list is part of a larger series of list articles that cover the various wars involving the United States from its colonial roots to the present. They are:

- Lists of wars involving the United States
  - List of 17th-century wars involving the Thirteen Colonies (1609–1700)
  - List of 18th-century wars involving the Thirteen Colonies (1701–1774)
  - List of wars involving the United States in the 18th century (1775–1800)
  - List of wars involving the United States in the 19th century (1801-1850)
  - List of wars involving the United States in the 19th century (1851-1900)
  - List of wars involving the United States in the 20th century (1901–2000)
  - List of wars involving the United States in the 21st century (2001–present)

For the criteria of what may be permitted on this list, see Lists of wars involving the United States.

== Key ==
US victory (58)
Another result (7) (Note: A treaty or peace without a clear result, status quo ante bellum, result of civil or internal conflict, result unknown or indecisive, inconclusive.)
US defeat (3)

== 19th-century wars ==
| Conflict | Allies | Opponent(s) | Result | President(s) |
|---|---|---|---|---|
| Johanna Expedition (1851) Part of the African Slave Trade Patrol and the Blockade of Africa Location: Matsamudu, Comoros Islands, Johanna Island, Indian Ocean USS Dale off San José del Cabo, Mexico in 1847, by William Henry Meyers. | United States | (Anjouan) Johanna Sultanate | US victory: Johannans surrendered the town, houses, slaves, cattle and money to the U.S.A.; Most Favoured Nation Treaty Signed | Millard Fillmore (July 9, 1850 - March 4, 1853) |
| Sitgreaves Expedition (1851) Part of the American Indian Wars Location: New Mexico territory, Arizona territory, California On the Big Colorado, near Camp 37 by J. Ackerman. | United States | Mohave | US victory: Mohave attack repulsed; Expedition successful; The Zuni, Little Colorado, and Big Colorado rivers, successfully mapped; Path open for pioneer emigration | Millard Fillmore (July 9, 1850 - March 4, 1853) |
| Battle of Muddy Flat (1854) Part of the Taiping Rebellion and the Small Swords Society Uprising Location: Shanghai, China Battle of Muddy Flat along the Defense Creek | United States (United Kingdom) British Empire Shanghai Volunteer Corps Taiping Heavenly Kingdom | China Pirate Mercenaries | US-allied victory: Qing forces retreat a mile away from the foreign concessions area; Adherence to Foreign Extraterritoriality Status Maintained; Yangtze Patrol, Shanghai Municipal Council, Shanghai Municipal Police, and the Chinese Maritime Customs Service established | Franklin Pierce (March 4, 1853 - March 4, 1857) |
| First Sioux War (1854–1856) Part of the Sioux Wars and the American Indian Wars Location: East of Fort Laramie, Nebraska Territory | United States | Lakota Sioux | US victory: The war was caused by the Grattan Massacre | Franklin Pierce (March 4, 1853 – March 4, 1857) |
| Bleeding Kansas (1854–1861) Location: Kansas and Missouri Sacking of Lawrence in 1856 | Anti-slavery settlers (Free-Staters) | Pro-slavery settlers (Border Ruffians) | Free-Stater victory.: Lawrence sacked; John Brown kills five people in the Pottawatomie Massacre; Many raids and battles between proslavers and abolitionists; Battle of Palmyra; Battle of Black Jack; Battle of Osawatomie; Forces Disbanded; Marias Des Cygnes Massacre; Battle of the Spurs; Kansas admitted as a free state on January 29, 1861. | Franklin Pierce (March 4, 1853 – March 4, 1857) James Buchannan (March 4, 1857 – March 4, 1861) Abraham Lincoln (March 4, 1861 – April 15, 1865) |
| Bombardment of Greytown (1854) Location: Greytown, Mosquito Coast (Modern Day Nicaragua) An illustration of USS Cyane bombarding Greytown | United States | Mosquito Coast | US victory: Monroe Doctrine enforced; Beginning of a gradual decline of the Mosquito Coast as a British Protectorate | Franklin Pierce (March 4, 1853 - March 4, 1857) |
| 1854 expedition to Coulan Location: Kowloon Bay, Pearl River Delta HMS Encounter | United Kingdom Qing dynasty Kingdom of Portugal United States | Pirates | US-allied victory: Pirate Junks, villages, and batteries destroyed | Franklin Pierce (March 4, 1853 - March 4, 1857) |
| USS Water Witch incident (1855) Location: Paraná River, Paraguay USS Water Witch is fired on by Fort Itapirú for trespassing in Paraguayan territorial waters (1 February 1855) | United States | Paraguay | Paraguayan victory: USS Water Witch damaged with one KIA, and returned fire to no effect; The United States forbidden from Paraguayan waters ending the 1853 Rio de La Plata Expedition in that region; The Incident later contributes to the Paraguay expedition from 1858–1859 | Franklin Pierce (March 4, 1853 - March 4, 1857) |
| Battle of Ty-ho Bay (1855) Location: Off Tai O, Hong Kong A model of an eight gun pirate junk. | United Kingdom United States Kingdom of Portugal | Chinese Pirates | US-allied victory: Successful rescuing of captured merchant vessels; One of the first battles with joint Anglo-American cooperation; One of the final battles between organized pirate fleets and western navies in the South China Sea | Franklin Pierce (March 4, 1853 - March 4, 1857) |
| 1855 Fiji expedition Part of the Fiji expeditions Location: Fiji Lautoka on Viti Levu in 1842 | United States | Fijians | US victory: Fijian villages at Lautoka torched by U.S. marines and sailors; self-proclaimed Fijian king Seru Epenisa Cakobau remained unable to pay the $45,000 compensation; Fiji continued to remain unstable and did not secure long-term safety for American commercial interests | Franklin Pierce (March 4, 1853 - March 4, 1857) |
| Rogue River Wars (1855–1856) Part of the American Indian Wars Location: Rogue Valley | United States | Tututni | US victory: Indians relocated to Siletz, Grand Ronde and Coast Reservations | Franklin Pierce (March 4, 1853 - March 4, 1857) |
| Puget Sound War (1855–1856) Part of the American Indian Wars Location: Washington | United States Snoqualmie | Nisqually Muckleshoot Puyallup Klickitat Haida Tlingit | US victory: Indians relocated to Siletz, Grand Ronde and Coast Reservations | Franklin Pierce (March 4, 1853 - March 4, 1857) |
| Third Seminole War (1855–1858) Part of the Seminole Wars and the American Indian Wars Location: Pensacola, Florida | United States | Seminole | US Victory: By late 1850s, most Seminoles forced to leave their land; a few hundred remain deep in the Everglades on land unwanted by white settlers | Franklin Pierce (March 4, 1853 – March 4, 1857) James Buchanan (March 4, 1857 – March 4, 1861) |
| Yakima War (1855–1858) Part of the American Indian Wars Location: Washington Territory Seattleites evacuate to the town blockhouse as USS Decatur opens fire on advancing tribal forces. | United States Snoqualmie | Yakama Walla Walla tribe Umatilla tribe Nez Perce tribe Cayuse tribe | US victory: Yakima cedes land in modern day Oregon and Washington; 1855 Walla Walla Treaty leads to the permanent confinement of Yakima and allied indigenous tribes to reservations | Franklin Pierce (March 4, 1853 – March 4, 1857) James Buchanan (March 4, 1857 – March 4, 1861) |
| Second Opium War (1856–1860) Part of the Opium Wars Location: China Palikao's bridge, on the evening of the battle, by Émile Bayard | United Kingdom; France; Russian Empire; United States | China | US victory: Treaties of Tientsin; Kowloon Peninsula and Stonecutters Island ceded to the United Kingdom as part of British Hong Kong | Franklin Pierce (March 4, 1853 – March 4, 1857) James Buchanan (March 4, 1857 – March 4, 1861) |
| Battle of Port Gamble (1856) Part of the American Indian Wars Location: Port Gamble, Washington | United States | Haida | US victory: Haida raiders bombarded; Survivors were captured and later relocated to the British Columbia and Russian America border | Franklin Pierce (March 4, 1853 – March 4, 1857) |
| Utah War (1857–1858) Part of the Mormon wars Location: Utah Territory and Wyoming | United States | Deseret/Utah Mormons (Nauvoo Legion) | Inconclusive/Other Result: Resolution through negotiation; Brigham Young replaced as governor of the territory; Full amnesty for charges of sedition and treason issued to the citizens of Utah Territory by President James Buchanan on the condition that they accept American Federal authority | James Buchanan (March 4, 1857 - March 4, 1861) |
| Second Attempt by William Walker to Invade Nicaragua (1857) Part of the Filibuster Wars of William Walker Location: Nicaragua | United States Nicaragua United Kingdom | Filibusters | US-allied victory: Filibusters arrested by Marines and Sailors of the Home Squadron led by Commodore Hiram Paulding, with the aid of a Royal Navy show of force; James Buchanan relieved Paulding of his command until the Civil War; Walker was later released in the U.S. and attempted to Invade Honduras, but was captured by the Royal Navy and handed over to the Honduran government and was executed | James Buchanan (March 4, 1857 - March 4, 1861) |
| Reform War (1857–1861) Location: Mexico The USS Savannah which fought in the Battle of Antón Lizardo in March 1860 | (Mexico) Liberals United States | (Mexico) Conservatives | Liberals - US victory: 1857 Mexican Constitution reduces powers of the military and the Catholic Church; Mexico enacts the Reform Laws and becomes a Secular state that separates the Catholic Church from the state; Abolition of privileges for clergy and military personale; Mexico was left with heavy damaged infrastructure and would have national debt, leading to the French Invasion of Mexico in 1861 | James Buchanan (March 4, 1857 - March 4, 1861) |
| 1858 Fiji expedition Part of the Fiji expeditions Location: Fiji | United States | Fijians | US victory: Financial claims pressed by the United States onto self-proclaimed king Seru Epenisa Cakobau remained unsettled for years; Cakobau offered to cede Fijian territory to the British due to lots of foreign debt and local conflicts | James Buchanan (March 4, 1857 - March 4, 1861) |
| Mohave War (1858–1859) Part of the American Indian Wars Location: Arizona territory A drawing of Mojave Indians from the Whipple Expedition (1853 to 1854) by Balduin Möllhausen. | United States Maricopa | Mohave Hualapai | US-allied victory: The Mohave and their allies surrender; The guerrilla war between the Maricopa and the Mohave ends | James Buchanan (March 4, 1857 - March 4, 1861) |
| Pig War (1859) Location: San Juan Islands Proposed boundaries: Through Haro Strait, favored by the US Through Rosario Strait, favored by Britain Through San Juan Channel, compromise proposal The lines are as shown on maps of the time. The modern boundary follows straight line segments and roughly follows the blue line. The modern eastern boundary of San Juan County roughly follows the red line. | United States: Washington Territory | United Kingdom: Colony of Vancouver Island | Inconclusive/Other Result: Treaty of Washington; Mostly a bloodless war – San Juan Islands awarded to the United States following third-party arbitration | James Buchanan (March 4, 1857 - March 4, 1861) |
| John Brown's raid on Harpers Ferry (1859) Part of pre-Civil War conflicts Location: West Virginia 1897 illustration of U.S. Marines attacking John Brown's "Fort" Teresa Baine | United States | Abolitionist Insurgents | US victory: John Brown's forces surrounded; Battle for the engine house; Brown captured and executed | James Buchanan (March 4, 1857 - March 4, 1861) |
| First and Second Cortina War (1859–1861) Location: Texas and Mexico | United States (Confederate States of America) Confederate States Mexico | (Mexico) Cortinista bandits | US-allied victory: Brownsville occupied by Cortinans and later expelled; Cortinan invasion of Zapata County repulsed | James Buchanan (March 4, 1857 - March 4, 1861) Abraham Lincoln (March 4, 1861 - April 15, 1865) |
| Paiute War (1860) Part of the American Indian Wars Location: Pyramid Lake, Nevada | United States | Paiute Shoshone Bannock | US victory: Many Paiute people killed or displaced; U.S. Settler and military presence increased | James Buchanan (March 4, 1857 - March 4, 1861) |
| American Civil War (1861–1865) Location: Southern United States, Indian Territory, Northeastern United States, Western United States, Atlantic Ocean The Battle of Gettysburg, July 1863. | Union (American Civil War) Indian Home Guard Seminole Nation (Western) (most) Seminole Nation (Florida) Muskogee Nation (part) | Confederate States Missouri Guard Cherokee Nation Choctaw Nation Catawba Chickasaw Nation (part) Muskogee Nation (part) Seminole Nation (Western) (part) Comanche Nation (part) | Union victory: Dissolution of the Confederate States; U.S. territorial integrity preserved; Beginning of the Reconstruction Era; U.S. Federal government expands further control over land and railroad rights in the Indian Territory. | Abraham Lincoln (March 4, 1861 - April 15, 1865) |
| Bombardment of Qui Nhơn (1861) Part of the Cochinchina Campaign Location: Qui Nhơn, Vietnam USS Saginaw at Mare Island naval yard. | United States | Đại Nam under the Nguyễn dynasty | US victory: Vietnamese-held fort destroyed | Abraham Lincoln (March 4, 1861 - April 15, 1865) |
| Yavapai Wars (1861–1875) Part of the American Indian Wars Location: Arizona Rescue of Lt. Charles King | United States | Yavapai Apache Yuma Mohave | US victory: Yavapai Indians relocated to the San Carlos Reservation; Arizona Territory open to more settlementation | Abraham Lincoln (March 4, 1861 – April 15, 1865) Andrew Johnson (April 15, 1865 – March 4, 1869) Ulysses S. Grant (March 4, 1869 – March 4, 1877) |
| Dakota War of 1862 (1862) Part of the Sioux Wars and the American Indian Wars Location: Minnesota and Dakota The Siege of New Ulm, Minnesota on August 19, 1862 | United States | Dakota Sioux | US victory: 303 Dakota men sentenced to death in Mankato for participating in the conflict, the largest mass execution in US history.; Multiple Dakotans moved into the Crow Creek Reservation | Abraham Lincoln (March 4, 1861 - April 15, 1865) |
| 1st Battle of Shimonoseki Straits and the following Shimonoseki campaign (1863–1864) Part of Bakumatsu Conflicts Location: Shimonoseki Straits, Honshu, Japan USS Wyoming sinking the American built Koshin (Originally the Lancefield) which had been gifted to Japan that same year (1863) | United States British Empire (France) French Empire Netherlands | Chōshū Domain | US-allied victory: Treaty of Amity and Commerce enforced | Abraham Lincoln (March 4, 1861 - April 15, 1865) |
| Colorado War (1863–1865) Part of the Sioux Wars and the American Indian Wars Location: Colorado, Wyoming, and Nebraska | United States | Cheyenne Arapaho Sioux | Inconclusive/Other Result: Military and congressional hearings against John Chivington | Abraham Lincoln (March 4, 1861 - April 15, 1865) |
| Snake War (1864–1868) Part of the American Indian Wars Locations: Oregon, Nevada, California, and Idaho | United States | Paiute Bannock Shoshone | US victory: Many Natives moved to reservations; Weakening of Native resistance and safer US travel routes; Strengthened Federal and Settler control in the region | Abraham Lincoln (March 4, 1861 – April 15, 1865) Andrew Johnson (April 15, 1865 – March 4, 1869) |
| Hualapai War (1865–1870) Part of the American Indian Wars, Yavapai Wars (Note: The Hualapai War and the Yavapai Wars were contemporaneous and overlapped each other, but were distinct conflicts.) Location: Arizona Territory An 1869 map of the United States Army Camp Date Creek and the nearby Hualapai reservation. | United States: Mohave Scouts | Hualapai Yavapai Havasupai | US victory: An outbreak of dysentery and whooping cough that caused many of the natives to surrender; Hualapai forced onto reservations | Andrew Johnson (April 15, 1865 - March 4, 1869) |
| Powder River War (1865) Part of the Sioux Wars and the American Indian Wars Location: Powder River State | United States | Sioux Cheyenne Arapaho | Inconclusive: Indigenous alliances strengthened; Patrick Connor's expedition temporarily weakened indigenous military presence | Andrew Johnson (April 15, 1865 - March 4, 1869) |
| Fenian raids (1866–1871) Part the Fenian Rising Location: Eastern Canada, New England, and Minnesota | Canada (Note: Raids that were carried out in 1866 took place in the Province of Canada and the colony of New Brunswick; prior to Confederation in 1867.) United Kingdom Métis Supported by: United States | Fenian Brotherhood | Anglo-American victory: The United States Army and Navy (USS Michigan (1843)) made numerous arrests of Fenian rebels as well as captured weapons and ammo.; Grant pardoned many Fenians as the raids died down; Canadian victory helped develop a sense of Canadian nationalism and spurred on the Canadian Confederation; Anti-American and Anti-Canadian sentiment grew between the U.S. and Canada as the United States was seen as too tolerant of the Fenians, but the United States saw this as retribution for the British-Canadian tolerance and aid to the Confederate Secret Service during the American Civil War | Andrew Johnson (April 15, 1865 – March 4, 1869) Ulysses S. Grant (March 4, 1869 – March 4, 1877) |
| Red Cloud's War (1866–1868) Part of the Sioux Wars and the American Indian Wars Location: Powder River State The Fetterman Massacre | United States Crow Nation | Lakota Cheyenne Arapaho | Lakota-allied victory: Treaty of Fort Laramie (1868); Legal control of Powder River Country ceded to Native Americans; Creation of the Great Sioux Reservation (including the Black Hills) | Andrew Johnson (April 15, 1865 - March 4, 1869) |
| Formosa Expedition (1867) Location: Hengchun, Taiwan, Qing China Attack of United States Marines and Sailors on the pirates of the island of Formosa, East Indies, Harper's Weekly | United States | Paiwan | Paiwan victory: American merchant ship Rover wrecked and its crew killed | Andrew Johnson (April 15, 1865 - March 4, 1869) |
| Comanche Campaign (1867–1875) Part of the American Indian Wars Location: Western United States Battle of Beecher Island. One soldier and three horses have fallen, while others continue to wage the battle. | United States | Cheyenne Arapaho Comanche Kiowa | US victory: Natives forced into reservations in the Indian Territory; Decisive Red River War during the campaign; End of organized Comanche resistance | Andrew Johnson (April 15, 1865 – March 4, 1869) Ulysses S. Grant (March 4, 1869 – March 4, 1877) |
| Kake War (1869) Part of the American Indian Wars Location: Kake, Alaska | United States | Tlingit | US victory: three villages and two wooden forts destroyed; subsequent undetermined number of starvation deaths of Tlingit during the winter period | Andrew Johnson (April 15, 1865 – March 4, 1869) |
| Wrangell Bombardment (1869) Part of the American Indian Wars Location: Wrangell, Alaska | United States | Stikine Tlingit | US victory: Village bombarded; Tlinget Scutd-doo captured, tried for murder and executed by hanging | Ulysses S. Grant (March 4, 1869 – March 4, 1877) |
| Battle of Boca Teacapan (1870) Location: Boca Teacapan, Sinaloa, Teacapan Estuary, Mexico | United States | Mexican Pirates | US victory: Destruction of the pirate ship Forward | Ulysses S. Grant (March 4, 1869 – March 4, 1877) |
| United States expedition to Korea (1871) Location: Ganghwa Island The captured Sujagi aboard USS Colorado in June 1871 | United States | Joseon dynasty | Inconclusive/Other Result American military victory American diplomatic failure: Withdrawal of American forces; Korea retains isolationist policies; Eventual signing of the United States–Korea Treaty of 1882 | Ulysses S. Grant (March 4, 1869 – March 4, 1877) |
| Modoc War (1872–1873) Part of the American Indian Wars Location: California and Oregon Engraving of soldiers recovering the bodies of the slain May 3, 1873. | United States | Modoc | US victory: General Edward Canby killed; Executions and forced exile of the Modoc | Ulysses S. Grant (March 4, 1869 – March 4, 1877) |
| Red River War (1874–1875) Part of the American Indian Wars Location: Texas | United States | Cheyenne Arapaho Comanche Kiowa | US victory: End to the Texas-Indian Wars | Ulysses S. Grant (March 4, 1869 – March 4, 1877) |
| Liberian–Grebo War (1875-1876) Location: Liberia | Liberia Supported by: United States | Grebo People | US–Liberian victory: The USS Alaska forces the Grebo to surrender; Attempt to establish the "G'debo Reunited Kingdom failed; Grebo forced onto land concessions; Captain Alexander Alderman Semmes made sure in the agreement that the Grebo were given Liberian citizenship | Ulysses S. Grant (March 4, 1869 – March 4, 1877) |
| Las Cuevas War (1875) Location: Texas and Mexico Texan soldiers. | United States | Mexican bandits | US victory: Cattle returned to Texas | Ulysses S. Grant (March 4, 1869 – March 4, 1877) |
| Great Sioux War of 1876 (1876–1877) Part of the Sioux Wars and the American Indian Wars Location: Montana, Dakota and Wyoming The Battle of the Little Bighorn, June 1876 | United States | Lakota Dakota SiouxNorthern CheyenneArapaho | US victory: Legal control of Powder River Country ceded to the United States | Ulysses S. Grant (March 4, 1869 – March 4, 1877) Rutherford B. Hayes (March 4, 1877 – March 4, 1881) |
| Buffalo Hunters' War (1876–1877) Part of the American Indian Wars Location: Texas and Oklahoma | United States | Comanche Apache | US victory: End of resistance in the Southern Plains; Decline of the bison populations in the region | Ulysses S. Grant (March 4, 1869 – March 4, 1877) Rutherford B. Hayes (March 4, 1877 – March 4, 1881) |
| Nez Perce War (1877) Part of the American Indian Wars Location: Oregon, Idaho, Wyoming, and Montana Chief Joseph's band in the Battle of Bear Paw Mountain | United States | Nez Perce Palouse | US victory: 432 surviving Nez Perce prisoners relocated to Indian Territory; The tribe was allowed to return back to the northern states in 1885, but was split into many different reservations; 200 Nez Perce under chief White Bird escaped into Canada and joined Sitting Bulls Sioux camp at Fort Walsh | Rutherford B. Hayes (March 4, 1877 – March 4, 1881) |
| Bannock War (1878) Part of the American Indian Wars Location: Idaho, Oregon, and Wyoming | United States | Bannock Shoshone Paiute | US victory: 543 native prisoners relocated to Yakama Indian Reservation; Loss of Camas prairie access for the natives | Rutherford B. Hayes (March 4, 1877 – March 4, 1881) |
| Cheyenne War (1878–1879) Part of the American Indian Wars Location: Oklahoma, Kansas, Nebraska, South Dakota and Montana Aftermath of the Battle of "The Pit." | United States | Cheyenne | US victory: Sand Creek massacre and Washita massacre | Rutherford B. Hayes (March 4, 1877 – March 4, 1881) |
| Sheepeater Indian War (1879) Part of the American Indian Wars Location: Idaho | United States | Shoshone | US victory: Last major Indian war fought in the Pacific Northwest | Rutherford B. Hayes (March 4, 1877 – March 4, 1881) |
| Victorio's War (1879–1880) Part of the American Indian Wars Location: Mexico | United States Mexico | Apache | US-allied victory: Death of chief Victorio; Occupation of the Mescalero Reservation | Rutherford B. Hayes (March 4, 1877 – March 4, 1881) |
| White River War (1879) Part of the American Indian Wars Location: Colorado Battle of Milk Creek Canyon | United States | Ute | US victory: Intense anti-Ute sentiment | Rutherford B. Hayes (March 4, 1877 – March 4, 1881) |
| Egyptian Expedition (1882) Part of the Anglo-Egyptian War Location: Alexandria Front page of "Judge" magazine, August 12, 1882, featuring a cartoon by "JAW" concerning aid rendered by the American navy during the British bombardment of Alexandria. | United States | Egypt | US victory: Admiral James W. Nicholson sends 73 marines and 57 sailors to guard the U.S. consulate and maintain order after the Bombardment of Alexandria by British and French warships | Chester A. Arthur (September 19, 1881 - March 4, 1885) |
| Angoon bombardment (1882) Part of the American Indian Wars Location: Angoon, Alaska | United States | Tlingit | US victory: Hostages rescued; Village destroyed; civilians killed; subsequent undetermined number of starvation deaths of Tlingit during the winter period | Chester A. Arthur (September 19, 1881 - March 4, 1885) |
| Burning of Colón (1885) Part of the Colombian Civil War (1884–1885) and the Panama crisis of 1885 Location: Colón, Colombia (Modern day Panama) Sailors of the USS Galena in the 1880s | United States | Panamanian rebels Colombia Supported by: Chile | US victory: Colón destroyed; rebels retreat; American hostages released; First time a U.S. Marine Corps assembled a brigade level formation | Grover Cleveland (March 4, 1885 - March 4, 1889) |
| Crow War (1887) Part of the American Indian Wars Location: Montana Crow Indians Firing into the Agency 1887 | United States | Crow people | US victory: Death of Sword Bearer; Seven crow warriors killed and nine taken prisoner | Grover Cleveland (March 4, 1885 - March 4, 1889) |
| Ghost Dance War (1890–1891) Part of the Sioux Wars and the American Indian Wars Location: South Dakota Mass grave for the dead Lakota after the Wounded Knee Massacre. | United States | Sioux | US victory: Wounded Knee Massacre; Death of Sitting Bull | Benjamin Harrison (March 4, 1889 - March 4, 1893) |
| Garza War (1891–1893) Location: Texas and Mexico 3rd Cavalry Troopers searching a suspected Revolutionist, 1892 | Mexico United States | Garzistas | US-allied victory | Benjamin Harrison (March 4, 1889 - March 4, 1893) |
| Overthrow of the Hawaiian Kingdom (1893) Part of the Hawaiian Rebellions (1887–1895) Location: Honolulu, Hawaiian Kingdom The USS Boston's landing force on duty at the Arlington Hotel, Honolulu, at the time of the overthrow of the Hawaiian monarchy, January 1893. Lieutenant Lucien Young, USN, commanded the detachment, and is presumably the officer at right. | United States (Hawaii) Committee of Safety | Hawaiian Kingdom | US-Hawaiian League victory: Surrender of the Hawaiian Kingdom; Queen Liliʻuokalani relinquishes power; Provisional Government, later renamed a Republic, established; Hawaii organized into a territory, then a state of the United States | Benjamin Harrison (March 4, 1889 - March 4, 1893) |
| Rio de Janeiro Affair (1894) Part of the Brazilian Naval Revolt Location: Guanabara Bay, Rio de Janeiro, Brazil Cruiser Detroit in the Guanabara Bay, during the Brazilian Naval Revolt (L'Univers illustré, Levy (Paris), nº 2.029, 10 February 1894). | United States | Brazilian Navy Rebels | US victory: End of the rebel blockade; Rio de Janeiro reopened to American commerce | Grover Cleveland (March 4, 1893 – March 4, 1897) |
| Yaqui Wars (1896–1929) Part of the American Indian Wars Location: Arizona and Mexico 10th Cavalry soldiers holding Yaqui prisoners at their camp in Bear Valley, January 9, 1918. | United States Mexico | Yaqui Pima Opata | US-allied victory | Grover Cleveland (March 4, 1893 – March 4, 1897) William McKinley (March 4, 1897 – September 14, 1901) Theodore Roosevelt (September 14, 1901 – March 4, 1909) William Howard Taft (March 4, 1909 – March 4, 1913) Woodrow Wilson (March 4, 1913 – March 4, 1921) Warren G. Harding (March 4, 1921 – August 2, 1923) Calvin Coolidge (August 2, 1923 – March 4, 1929) |
| Second Samoan Civil War (1898–1899) Location: Samoa Samoan warriors and American servicemen during the Siege of Apia in March 1899. | Samoa United States | Mataafans German Empire | Inconclusive/Other Result: Allies and Rebels compromise for peace Tripartite Convention; United States acquires American Samoa; United Kingdom withdraws claim in exchange for concessions in the Solomon Islands; Germany acquires German Samoa; Mata'afa Iosefo becomes paramount chief of Samoa | William McKinley (March 4, 1897 - September 14, 1901) |
| Spanish–American War (1898) Location: Cuba, Puerto Rico, Philippines and Guam Theodore Roosevelt and the "Rough Riders" after the Battle of San Juan Hill. | United States Cuban Revolutionaries Filipino Revolutionaries | Spain: Cuba; Guam; Philippines; Puerto Rico | US-allied victory: Treaty of Paris; Fall of the Spanish Empire; United States took possession of the Spanish colonies: Puerto Rico, Philippines and Guam; Protectorate over Cuba; Rise of the United States as a world power; Founding of the First Philippine Republic and beginning of the Philippine–American War; The war contributed to the popular image of Theodore Roosevelt as a war hero and advanced his career, in 1901 became the 26th president of the United States; Spain sells to Germany its last colonies in the Pacific in 1899 | William McKinley (March 4, 1897 - September 14, 1901) |
| Philippine–American War (1899–1902) Location: Philippines U.S. soldiers during the Battle of Manila. | 1899–1902 United States: Military government; 1902-1906 United States: Civil government | 1899–1902 Philippine Republic: Negros Republic; Zamboanga Republic; Limited Foreign Support: Empire of Japan: Shishi; 1902-1906 Tagalog Republic: Irrenconcilables | US victory: Occupation of the Philippines; Establishment of the Insular Government of the Philippine Islands; President Emilio Aguinaldo captured; Dissolution of the First Philippine Republic | William McKinley (March 4, 1897 – September 14, 1901) Theodore Roosevelt (September 14, 1901 – March 4, 1909) |
| Moro Rebellion (1899–1913) Location: Philippines American soldiers battling against Moro fighters. | United States | Moro Remnants of the Sulu Sultanate | US victory: Total annexation of the Philippine Islands | William McKinley (March 4, 1897 – September 14, 1901) Theodore Roosevelt (September 14, 1901 – March 4, 1909) William Howard Taft (March 4, 1909 – March 4, 1913) Woodrow Wilson (March 4, 1913 – March 4, 1921) |
| Boxer Rebellion (1899–1901) Location: China U.S. soldiers during the Boxer Rebellion in China. | Eight-Nation Alliance British Empire Russia Japan France Germany United States Italy Austria-Hungary: Netherlands; Spain; Belgium; (Qing dynasty) Mutual Defence Pact of Southeast China (after 1900) | Boxer movement; Qing dynasty (after 1900) | US-allied victory: Signing of the Boxer Protocol; Provisions for foreign troops to be stationed in Beijing | William McKinley (March 4, 1897 - September 14, 1901) |

== See also ==
- List of notable deployments of U.S. military forces overseas
- Timeline of United States military operations
- Military history of the United States
- United States Armed Forces
- List of American military installations
- List of United States drone bases
- Itata incident
- List of wars involving the Confederate States of America
- Bering Sea Anti-Poaching Operations
- Honolulu Courthouse riot
