= List of wars involving the United States in the 18th century =

This is a list of military conflicts, that the United States has been involved in the 18th century.

This list is part of a larger series of list articles that cover the various wars involving the United States from its colonial roots to the present. They are:

- Lists of wars involving the United States
  - List of 17th-century wars involving the Thirteen Colonies (1609–1700)
  - List of 18th-century wars involving the Thirteen Colonies (1701–1774)
  - List of wars involving the United States in the 18th century (1775–1800)
  - List of wars involving the United States in the 19th century (1801-1850)
  - List of wars involving the United States in the 19th century (1851-1900)
  - List of wars involving the United States in the 20th century (1901–2000)
  - List of wars involving the United States in the 21st century (2001–present)

For the criteria of what may be permitted on this list, see Lists of wars involving the United States.

== Key ==
US victory (4)
Another result (1) (Note: A treaty or peace without a clear result, status quo ante bellum, result of civil or internal conflict, result unknown or indecisive, inconclusive.)
US defeat (2)

== 18th-century wars ==
Conflict	Allies	Opponent(s)	Result	U.S. leader
American Revolutionary War (1775–1783) Part of the American Revolution, Atlantic Revolutions, Anglo-French War (1778–1783), Fourth Anglo-Dutch War, Anglo-Spanish War (1779–1783), and the Second Anglo-Mysore War Location: North America, Atlantic Ocean, the Caribbean and Europe Specific locations of American involvement: Atlantic Ocean, Bahamas, Caribbean Sea, British America, Irish Sea, North Sea and Spain The Battle of Long Island, August 27, 1776	Patriots: Thirteen Colonies (1775); United Colonies (1775–1776); United States (from 1776) (Note: Including the United Colonies period from 1776 to 1781 and the Confederation period from 1781 to 1783.) List; New Hampshire; Massachusetts; Rhode Island; Connecticut; New York; New Jersey; Pennsylvania; Delaware; Maryland; Virginia; North Carolina; South Carolina; Georgia; France; Spain; Vermont Republic; Dutch Republic; Co-belligerents: Br. Canadien, Cong. rgts. (Note: Two independent "COR" Regiments, the Congress's Own Regiments, were recruited among British Canadiens. The 1st Canadian Regiment formed by James Livingston of Chambly, Quebec; and the 2nd Canadian Regiment formed by Moses Hazen of Saint-Jean-sur-Richelieu, Quebec.); Br. Canadien mil., Fr. led (Note: Augustin de La Balme independently marched on Detroit under a French flag with British Canadien militia recruited from western Quebec (Illinois County, Virginia) at the county seat of Kaskaskia, Cahokia, and Vincennes.); Native Americans: Oneida; Tuscarora; Catawba; Lenape; Chickasaw; Choctaw; Mohican; Mi'kmaq (Note: (until 1779)); Abenaki; Pedee; Lumbee; Co-belligerents with France Mysore Arakkal Kingdom Savanur State Banganapalle State	Great Britain: Loyalists; Quebec; Nova Scotia; West Florida; East Florida; Co-belligerents: Hesse (Note: 65% of Britain's German auxiliaries employed in North America were from Hesse-Kassel (16,000) and Hesse-Hanau (2,422), flying this same flag.); Brunswick (Note: Twenty percent of Britain's German auxiliaries employed in North America were from Brunswick-Wolfenbüttel (5,723), flying this flag.); German mercenaries/auxiliaries (Note: The British hired over 30,000 professional soldiers from various German states who served in North America from 1775 to 1782. Commentators and historians often refer to them as mercenaries or auxiliaries, terms that are sometimes used interchangeably.); Hesse-Kassel; Hesse-Hanau; Waldeck; Brunswick; Ansbach; Anhalt-Zerbst; Hanover Native Americans; Onondaga; Mohawk; Cayuga; Seneca; Mi'kmaq (Note: (from 1779)); Cherokee; Odawa; Muscogee; Susquehannock; Shawnee; Co-belligerents against France East India Company Travancore	US-allied victory: The American Revolution started as a civil war within the British Empire. (Note: Some historians name the 1861–1865 war the "Second American Civil War", because in their view, the American Revolutionary War can also be considered a civil war (since the term can be used in reference to any war in which one political body separates itself from another political body). They then refer to the Independence War, which resulted in the separation of the Thirteen Colonies from the British Empire, as the "First American Civil War". A significant number of American colonists stayed loyal to the British Crown and as Loyalists fought on the British side while opposite were a significant amount of colonists called Patriots who fought on the American side. In some localities, there was fierce fighting between Americans including gruesome instances of hanging, drawing, and quartering on both sides.: As early as 1789, David Ramsay, an American patriot historian, wrote in his History of the American Revolution that "Many circumstances concurred to make the American war particularly calamitous. It was originally a civil war in the estimation of both parties." Framing the American Revolutionary War as a civil war is gaining increasing examination.; A group of merchants in Bristol wrote to King George III in 1775 voicing their "most anxious apprehensions for ourselves and Posterity that we behold the growing distractions in America threaten" and ask for their majesty’s "Wisdom and Goodness" to save them from "a lasting and ruinous Civil War".; The "constrained voice" is a good synopsis of how the British viewed the American Revolutionary War, from anxiety to a foreboding sense of the conflict being a civil war.; In the early stages of the rebellion by the American colonists, most of them still saw themselves as English subjects who were being denied their rights as such. James Otis reportedly said that "Taxation without representation is tyranny", in protest of the lack of colonial representation in Parliament. What made the American Revolution look most like a civil war, though, was the reality that about one-third of the colonists, known as loyalists (or Tories), continued to support and fought on the side of the crown.) It became a larger international war in 1778 once France joined. (Note: British Library: "The Revolution was both an international conflict, with Britain and France vying on land and sea, and a civil war among the colonists, causing over 60,000 loyalists to flee their homes."; Encyclopædia Britannica: "Until early in 1778 the conflict was a civil war within the British Empire, but afterward it became an international war as France (in 1778) and Spain (in 1779) joined the colonies against Britain. Meanwhile, the Netherlands, which provided both official recognition of the United States and financial support for it, was engaged in its own war against Britain (see Anglo-Dutch wars)."); Signing of the United States Declaration of Independence in 1776.; Great Britain would not recognize American independence until signing the 1783 Treaty of Paris.; Great Britain cedes, generally, all mainland territories east of the Mississippi River, south of the Great Lakes, and north of the Floridas to the United States.; Great Britain cedes Tobago and Senegal to France.; Great Britain cedes Menorca, West Florida, and East Florida to Spain.	President of the Continental Congress: John Hancock; Henry Laurens; John Jay; Samuel Huntington; Thomas McKean; John Hanson; Elias Boudinot; Thomas Mifflin; Richard Henry Lee; John Hancock; Nathaniel Gorham; Arthur St. Clair; Cyrus Griffin
Cherokee–American wars (1776–1795) Part of the American Indian Wars Location: Old Southwest Abduction of Daniel Boone's daughter by the Cherokee	United States; Choctaw	Cherokee Supported by: Spanish Empire (1783–1788)	US-allied victory: Cherokee tribes forced to surrender tens of thousands of square miles of land in the Southern United States; Slow end to Cherokee and tribal autonomy with imposed boundary lines and severe restricted Cherokee governance; Legal dispossession with white settlers constantly settling in Cherokee lands past legal borders, institutionalizing land theft.	President of the Continental Congress: John Hancock; Henry Laurens; John Jay; Samuel Huntington; Thomas McKean; John Hanson; Elias Boudinot; Thomas Mifflin; Richard Henry Lee; John Hancock; Nathaniel Gorham; Arthur St. Clair; Cyrus Griffin; President of the United States: George Washington (April 30, 1789 – March 4, 1797)
Moroccan seizure of the Betsey (1784) Location: Off the coast of Cádiz, Spain	United States	Sultanate of Morocco	Moroccan victory: Merchant ship Betsey captured; U.S. forced to pay $30,000 ransom; Moroccan–American Treaty of Friendship signed, initiating the longest unbroken diplomatic relationship in U.S. history	President of the Continental Congress: Vacant (until November 30, 1784); Richard Henry Lee
Northwest Indian War (1785–1793) Part of the American Indian Wars Location: Northwest Territory The Battle of Fallen Timbers	United States; Chickasaw; Choctaw	Western Confederacy: Council of Three Fires; Iroquois Confederacy; Seven Nations of Canada; Wabash Confederacy (Wea, Piankashaw, and others); Illini Confederacy; Wyandot; Mississaugas; Menominee; Shawnee; Lenape; Miami; Kickapoo; Kaskaskia; Chickamauga Cherokee (or "Lower Cherokee"); Upper Muscogee; (Kingdom of Great Britain) Great Britain: (Kingdom of Great Britain) British North America	US-allied victory: Treaty of Greenville (1795); American occupation of the Northwest Territory	President of the Continental Congress: John Hancock; Nathaniel Gorham; Arthur St. Clair; Cyrus Griffin; President of the United States: George Washington (April 30, 1789 – March 4, 1797)
American–Algerian War (1785–1795) Part of Barbary–Portuguese conflicts Location: Mediterranean Sea and Atlantic Ocean Captain William Bainbridge paying tribute to the Dey of Algiers	United States (Kingdom of Portugal) Portugal (till 1793)	Regency of Algiers	Algerian victory: The United States is unable to defend itself except with merchant marines.; Portugal protects American merchant ships to secure grain shipments, until it made peace with Algeria in 1793.; Establishment of the United States Navy through the Naval Act of 1794.; The U.S. government agrees to pay an annual tribute of $21,600.; $1 million tribute offered to the Dey.	President of the Continental Congress: John Hancock; Nathaniel Gorham; Arthur St. Clair; Cyrus Griffin; President of the United States: George Washington (April 30, 1789 – March 4, 1797)
Quasi-War (1798–1800) Location: Atlantic Ocean, the Caribbean, the Indian Ocean and the Mediterranean USS Constellation vs. L'Insurgente	United States Co-belligerent: Great Britain (See: Invasion of Curaçao (1800))	(France) French Republic: (French First Republic) Guadeloupe; Spanish Empire (Neutral Defender); (See: Battle of Puerto Plata Harbor)	Inconclusive Convention of 1800: Peaceful cessation of Franco-American alliance; End of French privateer attacks on American shipping; American neutrality and renunciation of claims by France	President of the United States: John Adams (March 4, 1797 – March 4, 1801)
War of the South (1799 – 1800) Part of the Haitian Revolution and the Quasi-War Location: Saint-Domingue	(France) Pro-Toussaint forces Naval support: United States	(France) Pro-Rigaud forces	US-allied victory: U.S. Navy blockaded ports controlled by Rigaud; U.S. trades with Toussaint under "Toussaint's Clause"; Toussaint assumes control of the entirety of Saint-Domingue; Rigaud & mixed-race officers flee into exile; Reprisals & massacres against Rigaud supporters	President of the United States: John Adams (March 4, 1797 – March 4, 1801)

== See also ==
- List of notable deployments of U.S. military forces overseas
- Timeline of United States military operations
- Military history of the United States
- United States Armed Forces
- List of American military installations
- List of United States drone bases
- Confederation of United States of America
