= United States drone base in Seychelles =

Military base

The United States drone base in Seychelles is a military base operated by the United States and located at Seychelles International Airport in Mahé, Seychelles. The aerial fleet is made up of General Atomics MQ-9 Reaper drones. The drones have been hosted in Seychelles since 2009 and they are located in a hangar about a quarter of a mile from the main terminal of the airport.

The United States Air Force has a team on the ground in Seychelles (around 100 military personnel) who launch and land the drones, which are operated from the Creech Air Force Base in Nevada and Holloman Air Force Base in New Mexico.

== Operations ==
The US and Seychellois governments claimed that the main purpose of the base was to track pirates in the region, but as late as 2011, a senior official said the US had not yet used the drones for that purpose. Another stated goal was to have surveillance missions over Somalia.

While the drones were officially unarmed, there were secret discussions with the Seychelles about possibly asking if they could arm them, revealed by the United States diplomatic cables leak in 2011.

In April 2011, the operations were paused, but they were resumed in September 2011. Since then armed MQ-9 Reaper drones have been flown from the base to strike Al Qaeda affiliates in Somalia, supplementing the strikes from the Camp Lemonnier drone base in Djibouti.

A drone crashed due to mechanical reasons when landing in December 2011 and another drone crashed into the sea in April 2012 soon after takeoff.

== See also ==
- List of United States drone bases
