= Mormon War =

Mormon War may refer to:

- 1838 Mormon War (a.k.a. Missouri Mormon War), a conflict in 1838 between Latter Day Saints and their neighbors in northwestern Missouri
- Illinois Mormon War, a conflict in 1844–1846 between Latter Day Saints and their neighbors in western Illinois
- Utah War, a conflict in 1857–1858 between Latter Day Saints in Utah Territory and the United States federal government

== See also ==
- Mormonism and violence
