= United States declaration of war on Bulgaria =

1942 declaration of war

Declaration of state of war with Bulgaria
- Long title: Joint Resolution Declaring that a state of war exists between the Government of Bulgaria and the Government and the people of the United States and making provisions to prosecute the same
- Enacted by: the 77th United States Congress
- Effective: June 5, 1942

Citations
- Public law: Pub. L. 77–563
- Statutes at Large: 56 Stat. 307

Legislative history
- Introduced in the House as H.J.Res. 319

On June 5, 1942, the United States declared war on Bulgaria. Bulgaria was neutral during 1939–1941, but on March 1, 1941, Bulgaria signed the Tripartite Pact and officially joined the Axis bloc. Following this, the Bulgarian government declared war on the United Kingdom and the United States on December 13, 1941. On June 4, 1942, the United States Congress passed joint resolutions declaring war on Bulgaria along with Hungary and Romania. President Roosevelt approved all three declarations the following day.

Only one week later, the U.S. bombed the Romanian oilfields at Ploiești. The capital of Bulgaria, Sofia, and other Bulgarian cities, were bombed by Allied aircraft in 1943 and 1944.

As of March 4, 2026, the declarations of war against Bulgaria, Hungary, and Romania are the last formal declarations of war by the United States Congress, which in the era of collective security has largely abrogated war-making powers to the President.

== Text of the declaration ==
JOINT RESOLUTION Declaring that a state of war exists between the Government of Bulgaria and the Government and the people of the United States and making provisions to prosecute the same.

Whereas the Government of Bulgaria has formally declared war against the Government and the people of the United States of America: Therefore, be it

Resolved by the Senate and House of Representatives of the United States of America in Congress assembled, That the state of war between the United States and the Government of Bulgaria which has thus been thrust upon the United States is hereby formally declared; and the President is hereby authorized and directed to employ the entire naval and military forces of the United States and the resources of the Government to carry on war against the Government of Bulgaria; and, to bring the conflict to a successful termination, all the resources of the country are hereby pledged by the Congress of the United States.

== See also ==
- Military history of Bulgaria during World War II
- Bombing of Sofia in World War II
