= Sumatran expeditions =

The Sumatran expeditions can refer to:

- The First Sumatran expedition – An American expedition to the island in 1832, as redress for the taking of the massacre of the crew of the merchantman Friendship
- The Second Sumatran expedition – An American expedition to the island in 1838, as redress for the massacre of the merchantman Eclipse
