= Saint Thomas (Brandenburg colony) =

Former colony in modern US Virgin Islands (1685–1754)

Coordinates: 18°20′N 64°55′W

The Brandenburg colony of St. Thomas consisted of a leased part of the Danish island of St. Thomas (today part of the United States Virgin Islands) to the Brandenburg-Prussia margraviate of the Holy Roman Empire from 1685 to 1754.

== History ==
In the 17th century, the Margraviate of Brandenburg had several African colonies, including Brandenburger Gold Coast (Groß Friedrichsburg) and Arguin, which were involved in the slave trade. In order to support this business, Brandenburg needed a base in the Caribbean. For this reason, the Brandenburg Navy-General Director Benjamin Raule signed a rental agreement with the Danish West India Company on November 24, 1685. The agreement included a portion of the Danish Antilles island of St. Thomas, which had belonged to Denmark-Norway since 1666. The ownership of the island would belong to the Danish-Norwegian King, but Brandenburg was granted the right to use the land. In 1693 the Brandenburg section of Saint Thomas was seized by the Danes without any resistance or repayment. With the end of the Brandenburg African colonies (they were sold to the Dutch, Groß Friedrichsburg in 1718 and Arguin in 1721) there was no need to maintain a presence in Saint Thomas and the town completely passed from Brandenburg control.

=== Slave trade ===
The agreement between Brandenburg and the Danish West India Company included a number of sections on trade, primarily on slaves. They agreed that for 30 years a limited free trade (mostly on slaves) would apply. After the 30-year period, the price of a slave could not exceed 60 taler. For each imported slave, the Danes would receive 1% and for each exported slave 2% of the purchase price. If Brandenburg had an excess number of slaves, the Danes agreed to buy 100 slaves per year at a fixed price of 80 Taler. Finally, Brandenburg and the Danes agreed to work together on slaving expeditions to the Slave Coast. During the Brandenburg presence in Saint Thomas, some of the largest slave auctions in the world were held on the island.

== See also ==
- German colonization of the Americas
  - German interest in the Caribbean
- German colonial projects before 1871
