= List of incidents of civil unrest in Colonial North America =

Incidents of civil unrest in colonial North America included riots, rebellions, slave revolts, protests, and armed conflicts. Eighteenth-century entries include resistance to impressment and British colonial policies, including the Stamp Act and Townshend Acts, as well as the Boston Massacre, Gaspee Affair, and Boston Tea Party.

== 17th century – Colonial North America ==
- 1622 – Indian massacre of 1622
- 1635 – Acadian Civil War
- 1637 – Pequot War
- 1655 – Battle of the Severn, Province of Maryland
- 1669 – Revolt of the Long Swede, Middle Colonies
- 1676 – Bacon's Rebellion, Sept 19, Rebels burn down colonial capital, Virginia Colony
- 1677 – Culpeper's Rebellion, 1677–1678, Revolt against the ruling Lords Proprietors in Albemarle County, Province of Carolina, near what is now Elizabeth City, North Carolina
- 1680 – Pueblo Revolt
- 1683 – Gove's Rebellion
- 1689 – Boston revolt, Angered Bostonians rose up against the royal governor, Edmund Andros, jailed him, and took control of the city.
- 1689 – Leisler's Rebellion, 1689 to 1691, An uprising in lower New York against the policies of King James II of England, New York City

== 18th century – Colonial North America ==
- 1701 – New York – New Jersey Line War
- 1711 – Cary's Rebellion
- 1712 – New York Slave Revolt of 1712, April 6, New York City, New York
- 1715 – Yamasee War
- 1713 – Boston Bread Riot, Boston, Massachusetts
- 1719 – Revolution of 1719, Province of South Carolina
- 1730 – Cresap's War, Province of Pennsylvania
- 1734 – Mast Tree Riot, Fremont, New Hampshire
- 1737 – Boston Brothel Riot, Boston, Massachusetts
- 1739 – Stono Rebellion, Slave rebellion., September, Province of South Carolina
- 1741 – New York Slave Insurrection of 1741, New York City, New York
- 1742 – Philadelphia Election Riot, Philadelphia, Pennsylvania
- 1746 – New Jersey Tenant Riots, New Jersey
- 1747 – Knowles Riot, Boston, Massachusetts (anti-impressment)
- 1749 – Violence over the New Hampshire Grants with the Province of New York
- 1753 – Lunenburg Rebellion
- 1763 – Pontiac's War
- 1764 – Paxton Riots, Pennsylvania
- 1764 – Attack of HMS St John, Newport, Rhode Island
- 1765 – Regulator Movement in North Carolina, 1765–1771
- 1765 – Black Boys Rebellion, 1765 & 1769, Revolt against British policy regarding American Indians in western Pennsylvania. Conococheague Valley, colonial Pennsylvania
- 1765 – Stamp Act 1765 riots, Protests and riots in Boston, later spread throughout the colonies, notably Rhode Island, Maryland, New York, Pennsylvania, North Carolina, and South Carolina.
- 1768 – Liberty Riot, Boston (anti-impressment and anti-Townshend Acts)
- 1769 – Pennamite-Yankee War
- 1770 – Boston Massacre, Boston, Massachusetts
- 1771 – Battle of Alamance, Last battle of War of the Regulation, May 1771, Alamance, North Carolina
- 1772 – Gaspee Affair, Rhode Island
- 1772 – Pine Tree Riot, Weare, New Hampshire
- 1773 – Boston Tea Party, Boston, Massachusetts
- 1774 – The burning of the ship Peggy Stewart, October 19, 1774, The "Annapolis Tea Party", Action taken in Maryland to support the people in Boston following the Boston Tea Party, Annapolis, Maryland

== See also ==
- Colonial history of the United States
- List of incidents of civil unrest in the United States
- List of riots (notable incidents of civil disorder worldwide)
- List of strikes
- Timeline of labor issues and events
