= List of the United States drone bases =

This is a list of United States drone bases, containing military bases from which the United States operates unmanned aerial vehicles.

== Active ==
Country	Base, location	Operation dates	Operations	Notes
Burkina Faso	Ouagadougou Airport	since 2007	surveillance of Al-Qaeda in the Islamic Maghreb over Mali, Mauritania and the Sahara	
Cameroon	Garoua International Airport, Garoua		fight against Boko Haram in Nigeria	
Chad	N’Djamena	since 2014	fight against Boko Haram in Nigeria	
Djibouti	Chabelley Airport	since 2013		
Germany	Ramstein Air Base			
Kuwait	Ali Al Salem Air Base	from at least 2014	bombing ISIL in Iraq	
Philippines	Zamboanga International Airport	since 2012	bombing Abu Sayyaf and Jemaah Islamiyah in Southern Philippines	
Qatar	Al Udeid Air Base		bombing ISIL in Iraq	
Saudi Arabia	Umm Al Melh Border Guards Airport	since 2011	bombing Al-Qaeda in the Arabian Peninsula and ISIL in Yemen	secret CIA base
Seychelles	United States drone base in Seychelles, Seychelles International Airport	since 2009	surveillance of Al-Shabaab over Somalia	
Somalia	Kismayo Airport		surveillance of Al-Shabaab over Somalia	operated by the Joint Special Operations Command
Tunisia	Bizerte-Sidi Ahmed Air Base	since June 2016	surveillance missions over Libya	
Turkey	Incirlik Air Base, Adana		bombing ISIL and other groups in Syria	
United Arab Emirates	Al Dhafra Air Base		bombing ISIL in Iraq	

== Former ==
Country	Base, location	Operation dates	Operations	Notes
Afghanistan	Kandahar International Airport	until 2022		
Afghanistan	Forward Operating Base Chapman, Khost	until 2022		CIA facility
Afghanistan	Jalalabad Airport	until 2022		CIA-operated drones
Afghanistan	Bagram Airfield	until 2022		CIA-operated drones
Djibouti	Camp Lemonnier	2010-2013	bombing Al-Shabaab in Somalia, and Al-Qaeda in the Arabian Peninsula and ISIL in Yemen	operations moved to Chabelley over public safety concerns
Ethiopia	Arba Minch Airport	2011-2016	bombing Al Qaeda in East Africa	
Italy	Naval Air Station Sigonella	2016-2019	bombing ISIL in Libya in defense of special forces fighting ISIL	
Mauritania	Nouakchott	until 2008		operations ended after the 2008 Mauritanian coup d'état
Niger	Nigerien Air Base 201, Agadez	2019-2024		operations ended after the 2023 Nigerien coup d'état
Niger	Mano Dayak International Airport, Agadez	2014-2024		operations ended after the 2023 Nigerien coup d'état
Niger	Diori Hamani International Airport, Niamey	2013-2024		operations ended after the 2023 Nigerien coup d'état
Pakistan	Shamsi Airfield, Balochistan province	until 2011	bombing Taliban and other Islamist militants in the tribal areas of Pakistan	CIA ordered to leave after killing of Pakistani soldiers
Uzbekistan	Karshi-Khanabad Air Base	until 2005		CIA facility evicted by the Uzbek government

== See also ==
- List of American military installations
- List of countries with overseas military bases
- Base Realignment and Closure
- United States military deployments
- Lists of military installations
- American imperialism
- List of wars involving the United States
