= List of wars involving the United States in the 20th century =

This is a list of military conflicts, that United States has been involved in the 20th century.

This list is part of a larger series of list articles that cover the various wars involving the United States from its colonial roots to the present. They are:

- Lists of wars involving the United States
  - List of 17th-century wars involving the Thirteen Colonies (1609–1700)
  - List of 18th-century wars involving the Thirteen Colonies (1701–1774)
  - List of wars involving the United States in the 18th century (1775–1800)
  - List of wars involving the United States in the 19th century (1801-1850)
  - List of wars involving the United States in the 19th century (1851-1900)
  - List of wars involving the United States in the 20th century (1901–2000)
  - List of wars involving the United States in the 21st century (2001–present)

For the criteria of what may be permitted on this list, see Lists of wars involving the United States.

== Key ==
US victory (41)
Another result (8) (Note: A treaty or peace without a clear result, status quo ante bellum, result of civil or internal conflict, result unknown or indecisive, inconclusive.)
US defeat (16)

== 20th-century wars ==
Conflict	Allies	Opponent(s)	Result	Presidents
Crazy Snake's War (1909) Part of the American Indian Wars Location: Oklahoma Creek prisoners of war.	United States	Creek	US victory	Theodore Roosevelt (September 14, 1901 – March 4, 1909) William Howard Taft March 4, 1909 – March 4, 1913)
Mexican Border War (1910–1919) Part of the Mexican Revolution, the Banana Wars, and World War I Location: Mexico–United States border American troops of the 16th Infantry Regiment rest for the night on May 27, 1916.	United States	Mexico Supported by: German Empire	US victory: Battle of Columbus (1916); Battle of Ambos Nogales; Seditionist insurgency suppressed; Permanent border wall established; Pancho Villa's troops no longer an effective fighting force; Mexican Constitutionalist faction leader Venustiano Carranza recognised as the sole leaders of the Mexican government by the United States	William Howard Taft (March 4, 1909 – March 4, 1913) Woodrow Wilson (March 4, 1913 – March 4, 1921)
Little Race War (1912) Part of the Banana Wars Location: Cuba USS Mississippi in Cuba.	Cuba; United States	(Cuba) Cuban PIC	US-allied victory: Dissolution of the PIC	William Howard Taft (March 4, 1909 – March 4, 1913)
United States occupation of Nicaragua (1912–1933) Part of the Banana Wars Location: Nicaragua U.S. Marines holding a captured Sandinista flag.	United States; Nicaragua	Nicaraguan Liberals; Sandinistas	US victory: Change of regime in Nicaragua; Great Depression marks US withdrawal (1933)	William Howard Taft (March 4, 1909 – March 4, 1913) Woodrow Wilson (March 4, 1913 – March 4, 1921) Warren G. Harding (March 4, 1921 – August 2, 1923) Calvin Coolidge (August 2, 1923 – March 4, 1929) Herbert Hoover (March 4, 1929 – March 4, 1933)
Bluff War (1914–1915) Part of the American Indian Wars Location: Utah and Colorado Prisoners of the Bluff War in Thompson, Utah, waiting to board a train for their trial in Salt Lake City.	United States	Ute; Paiute	US victory	Woodrow Wilson (March 4, 1913 – March 4, 1921)
United States occupation of Veracruz (1914) Part of the Mexican Revolution Location: Mexico Three landing craft leaving USS Michigan during intervention at Veracruz, 1914.	United States Supported by: United Kingdom	Mexico Supported by: German Empire; Kingdom of Italy	US victory	Woodrow Wilson (March 4, 1913 – March 4, 1921)
United States occupation of Haiti (1915–1934) Part of the Banana Wars Location: Haiti U.S. Marines and sailors from the USS Washington ashore for the capture of Port-au-Prince, 1915.	United States; Haiti	(Haiti) Haitian Rebels	US-allied victory	Woodrow Wilson (March 4, 1913 – March 4, 1921) Warren G. Harding (March 4, 1921 – August 2, 1923) Calvin Coolidge (August 2, 1923 – March 4, 1929) Herbert Hoover (March 4, 1929 – March 4, 1933) Franklin D. Roosevelt (March 4, 1933 – April 12, 1945)
United States occupation of the Dominican Republic (1916–1924) Part of the Banana Wars Location: Dominican Republic U.S. Marines in the Occupation of the Dominican Republic, 1916.	United States	Dominican Republic	US victory	Woodrow Wilson (March 4, 1913 – March 4, 1921) Warren G. Harding (March 4, 1921 – August 2, 1923) Calvin Coolidge (August 2, 1923 – March 4, 1929)
World War I (1914–1918, direct U.S. involvement in 1917–1918) Location: Europe, Africa, Asia, Middle East, Atlantic Ocean, the Pacific Islands, and coast of North and South America Specific locations where the United States was involved in battles or attacks during World War I: Atlantic Ocean, Belgium, France, Italy U.S. troops firing 37mm gun during an advance against German entrenched positions during Meuse–Argonne offensive in France, 1918.	French Republic; British Empire: United Kingdom; Canada; Newfoundland; Australia; New Zealand; Ceylon; India; South Africa; Kingdom of Italy; United States (from 1917); Russian Empire (until 1917); Empire of Japan; Kingdom of Serbia; Kingdom of Montenegro; Kingdom of Romania; Kingdom of Greece; Belgium; Portugal; Republic of Armenia; Sultanate of Egypt; Idrisid Emirate of Asir; Emirate of Nejd and Hasa; Kingdom of Hejaz (Republic of China (1912–1949)) Republic of China (Thailand) Siam; Brazil	German Empire; Austro-Hungarian Empire; Ottoman Empire; Tsardom of Bulgaria	US-allied victory: American entry into World War I in 1917; First time in history, the United States sent soldiers abroad to defend foreign soil; October Revolution in the Russian Republic; On December 13, 1918, Woodrow Wilson arrived to France and became the first U.S. president to visit Europe while in office to take part in World War I peace negotiations; The fall of the German, Ottoman, and Austro-Hungarian empires; Formation of new countries in Europe and the Middle East; Transfer of German colonies and regions of the former Ottoman Empire to other powers; Establishment of the League of Nations, which led to the creation of today's United Nations; World War I was known as the "Great War" or simply the "World War" until the start of World War II in 1939 In August 1914, The Independent stated of the conflict, "This is the Great War. It names itself."	Woodrow Wilson (March 4, 1913 – March 4, 1921)
Russian Civil War (1917–1922, direct U.S. involvement in 1918–1920) Part of the Russian Revolution, the revolutions of 1917–1923 and the aftermath of World War I Location: Russia U.S. troops march through Russia before the Battle of Romanovka, 1918.	White Movement Mountain Republic; Makhnovshchina; Right SRs; Left SRs; Green armies Czechoslovakia; British Empire: United Kingdom; Canada; Australia; India; South Africa; Empire of Japan; Kingdom of Greece; United States; French Republic; Kingdom of Serbia; Romania; Italy; Poland; Estonia; Latvia; China; Mongolia	Russian SFSR Far Eastern Republic; Mongolian Communists; Makhnovshchina; Left SRs; Green armies	Bolshevik victory: The October Revolution led by the Russian Communist Party of Vladimir Lenin overthrows the Russian Provisional Government of the Russian Republic and establishes the Russian Socialist Federative Soviet Republic; The Red Terror and War Communism; The Communist Massacre of the Russian Royal Family; Around 5,000 American soldiers were part of an allied expedition; American Expeditionary Force, North Russia; American Expeditionary Force, Siberia; Victory for the Bolshevik Red Army in Russia, parts of Ukraine and Belarus, South Caucasus, Central Asia, Tuva, and Mongolia; incorporation of those territories (except for Tuva and Mongolia which become client states) into the Russian SFSR and later Soviet Union; Victory for pro-independence movements in Poland, Finland, Estonia, Latvia, Lithuania, and Poland; expulsion of Bolshevik forces from those territories	Woodrow Wilson (March 4, 1913 – March 4, 1921)
Facts of Trogir coup attempt (1919) Part of the 1918–1920 unrest in Split and the Aftermath of World War I Location: Trogir, Dalmatia, Kingdom of Yugoslavia (present day Croatia) The USS Olympia, used to land sailors and marines during the incident.	United States Italy Yugoslavia Citizens of Trogir	(Kingdom of Italy) Renegade Italian Army troops	US-allied victory: Coup attempt thwarted; Serbian Garrison released; Renedados arrested	Woodrow Wilson (March 4, 1913 – March 4, 1921)
Turkish War of Independence (U.S. involvement) (Note: See Occupation of Constantinople, the Greek landing at Smyrna, the Bombardment of Samsun, and the United States during the Turkish War of Independence) (1919–1922) Part of the Revolutions of 1917–1923 in the aftermath of World War I and the Greco-Turkish War (1919–1922) Location: Turkey U.S. and Greek occupation troops landing on Bandirma, July 1920.	Allied powers: Greece; French Republic (Note: The Treaty of Ankara was signed in 1921 and the Franco-Turkish War thus ended. The French troops remained in Constantinople with the other Allied troops.): French West Africa; Armenian Legion; Algeria; Morocco; Tunisia; British Empire (Note: The United Kingdom occupied Constantinople, then fought directly against Turkish irregular forces in the Greek Summer Offensive with the Greek troops. However, after this the United Kingdom would not take part in any more major fighting.): United Kingdom; India; United States; Armenia; Japan Istanbul Government (Note: The Ottoman controlled Kuva-yi Inzibatiye ("Caliphate Army") fought the Turkish revolutionaries during the Greek Summer Offensive and the Ottoman government in Constantinople supported other revolts (e.g. Anzavur).): Other pro-Istanbul rebels; Georgia Separatists: Pontic Greek rebels Kurdish rebels Assyrian rebels Green Army	Turkish Nationalists: Ankara Government (1919–1920; 1920–1923) Also: Azerbaijan (1918–1920); Aras Republic (1918–1919); Iğdır National Republic (1918–1920); Provisional Kars Government (1918–1919); Green Army (1919–1920); Oltu Council Government (1919–1920); Kurdistan (1919; 1921–1923); Supported by: Russian SFSR; Ukrainian SSR; Azerbaijan SSR; Bukharan PSR; Italy (Note: Italy occupied Constantinople and a part of southwestern Anatolia but never fought the Turkish army directly. During its occupation Italian troops protected Turkish civilians, who were living in the areas occupied by the Italian army, from Greek troops and accepted Turkish refugees who had to flee from the regions invaded by the Greek army. In July 1921 Italy began to withdraw its troops from southwestern Anatolia.); France (from 1921); Indian Muslims; Afghanistan	Turkish victory: Indirect U.S. involvement; The fall of the Ottoman Empire; Treaty of Lausanne; Establishment of the Republic of Turkey; Chester concession; Abolition of the Caliphate; Declaration of Amnesty ending the Prosecution of Ottoman war criminals for the Armenian, Greek, and Assyrian genocides	Woodrow Wilson (March 4, 1913 – March 4, 1921) Warren G. Harding (March 4, 1921 – August 2, 1923)
Posey War (1923) Part of the American Indian Wars Location: Utah Ute and Paiute prisoners of war.	United States	Ute; Paiute	US victory: Last Indian uprising	Warren G. Harding (March 4, 1921 – August 2, 1923)
Attack on the US embassy during the Fall of Addis Ababa (1936) Part of the Second Italo-Ethiopian War Location: Ethiopia Military parade of Italian troops in Addis Ababa in 1936.	United States Supported by: Kingdom of Italy; United Kingdom; Ethiopian civilians	Ethiopian rioters	US-allied victory: Chaos erupted in Addis Ababa after Ethiopia's emperor Haile Selassie I fled following the Italian victory in the Second Italo-Ethiopian War; Armed rioters surrounded the embassy, trapping American diplomats, U.S. Navy radio operators, and dozens of refugees inside; The entire defense fell on 12 people: Diplomat Cornelius Van Hemert Engert, his wife, six diplomatic staff and four U.S. Navy radio operators; The Navy operators kept communications alive, sending urgent SOS updates to Washington while under constant gunfire; Running out of ammunition, the entire American group was successfully evacuated by British troops; U.S. government closed its diplomatic mission in Addis Ababa a few months later	Franklin D. Roosevelt (March 4, 1933 – April 12, 1945)
USS Panay incident (1937) Part of the Second Sino-Japanese War, Battle of Nanking, and the Yangtze Patrol Location: China The USS Panay sinking after a Japanese air attack on the ship.	United States	Empire of Japan	Inconclusive/Other Result: U.S. servicemen attempted to return fire on their machine guns to ineffective results; Japan forced to pay war reparations	Franklin D. Roosevelt (March 4, 1933 – April 12, 1945)
World War II (1939–1945, direct U.S. involvement in 1941–1945) Location: Europe, Pacific Ocean, Atlantic Ocean, Southeast Asia, East Asia, Middle East, Mediterranean, North Africa, Oceania, North and South America Specific locations where the United States was involved in battles or attacks during World War II: Algeria, Aruba, Atlantic Ocean, Australia, Austria, Bay of Biscay, Belgium, Bering Sea, Bismarck Sea, Bosnia and Herzegovina, Brunei, Bulgaria, Burma, Caribbean Sea, China, Christmas Island, Coral Sea, Croatia, Czech Republic, East China Sea, Egypt, Federated States of Micronesia, France, Germany, Greenland, Gulf of Mexico, Hong Kong, Hungary, Iceland, Indonesia, Italy, Japan, Java Sea, Kiribati, Libya, Luxembourg, Malaysia, Malta, Manchukuo, Marshall Islands, Mediterranean Sea, Montenegro, Morocco, Nauru, Netherlands, Norway, Pacific Ocean, Palau, Papua New Guinea, Philippines, Philippine Sea, Poland, Romania, Serbia, Singapore, Slovakia, Solomon Islands, Solomon Sea, South China Sea, Soviet Union, Switzerland, Taiwan, Thailand, Timor-Leste, Tunisia, United States (Alaska, Guam, Hawaii, Midway Atoll, Northern Mariana Islands, Wake Island) Six United States Marines raising the U.S. flag atop Mount Suribachi during the Battle of Iwo Jima, February 1945.	Allies: French Republic; British Empire: United Kingdom; Canada; Australia; New Zealand; India; and others; United States (from 1941); Soviet Union (from 1941); Republic of China (Kingdom of Italy) Kingdom of the South (from 1943); Republic of Poland; Free City of Danzig (Czechoslovakia) Czechoslovak Republic; Kingdom of Yugoslavia; Kingdom of Greece; Denmark; Norway; Netherlands; Belgium; Luxembourg; Republic of Cuba; Turkey (from 1945); Republic of Haiti; Argentina; Brazil; Mexico; Chile; Peru; United States of Venezuela; Liberia; Kingdom of Egypt; Pahlavi Iran (from 1943) (Note: Iran was invaded by Soviet and British forces two months after the Axis invasion of the Soviet Union and the Soviet Union's subsequent alliance with the United Kingdom. Its strategic purpose was to ensure the safety of Allied supply lines to the USSR (see the Persian Corridor), secure Iranian oil fields, limit German influence in Iran (Reza Shah had leveraged Germany to offset the British and Soviet spheres of influence on Iran) and preempt a possible Axis advance from Turkey through Iran toward the Baku oil fields or British India. In 1943 Iran formalized its declaration of war against Germany.); Ethiopian Empire; Union of South Africa; Sultanate of Muscat and Oman; Kingdom of Nepal; Mongolian People's Republic; Tannu Tuva (until 1944) (Note: Tuva underwent intense Russification of social and economic practices, and virtually all remaining opposition to Stalinist policy was eradicated. The Soviets desired the mineral resources of the republic and a permanent end to Mongolian-Chinese geopolitical intrigues in the region. This process culminated in the absorption of Tuva in 1944.); Commonwealth of the Philippines (Korea) Korean Provisional Government	Axis: Nazi Germany; Empire of Japan; Kingdom of Italy (until 1943); Italian Social Republic (from 1943) (Note: The event that later gave rise to the Italian Civil War was the deposition and arrest of Benito Mussolini on 25 July 1943 by King Victor Emmanuel III, after which Italy signed the Armistice of Cassibile on 8 September 1943, ending its war with the Allies. However, German forces began occupying Italy immediately prior to the armistice, through Operation Achse, and then invaded and occupied Italy on a larger scale after the armistice, taking control of northern and central Italy and creating the Italian Social Republic.); Kingdom of Hungary; Kingdom of Romania (until 1944) (Note: A rapid military reversal impelled King Michael I to depose the pro-German dictator Marshal Ion Antonescu, triggering Romania's exit from the Axis.); Slovak Republic; Tsardom of Bulgaria (until 1944) (Note: Encountering itself in a precarious situation wherein it remained in Germany's orbit —politically and militarily— but faced an ever-increasing threat of the approaching Red Army, forces of the communist Fatherland Front staged a coup, overthrowing the pro-German government.); Independent State of Croatia; Finland (until 1944) (Note: Finland engaged in the Continuation War alongside Nazi Germany against the Soviet Union. As the tide of the war shifted to the Allies' side, however, Finland signed the Moscow Armistice, and undertook a military campaign to expel German troops from its territory—what is known as the Lapland War.); French State (until 1944) (Note: After the liberation of France began in 1944, the Free French Provisional Government of the French Republic was installed as the new national government, led by Charles de Gaulle. The last of the Vichy exiles were captured in the Sigmaringen enclave in April 1945.); Hellenic State; Quisling's Norway; Manchukuo; Mengjiang; RNG China; Thailand; Philippine Republic; Empire of Vietnam; Kingdom of Luang Prabang; Kingdom of Kampuchea; State of Burma; Free India; Kingdom of Iraq Non-Axis: Soviet Union (until 1941) (Note: While not formally a member of the Axis powers, the Soviet Union entered into a non-aggression pact with Nazi Germany and maintained a partnership with it from 1939 to 1941 through additional agreements. As part of its effort to carve spheres of influence, the USSR participated in the invasion and partition of Poland, annexed the Baltic States, seized Romanian territories, and fought Finland in the Winter War.); Francoist Spain (Note: Spanish policy towards Nazi Germany in particular —and the Axis in general— oscillated from “strict neutrality” to “non-belligerence”. While Hitler's efforts at the Meeting at Hendaye failed to bring Spain formally into the Axis, Madrid offered military support via the Blue Division and Blue Squadron. Partly because of the collapse of the Axis powers, partly because of Allied pressure, Spain withdrew most of its support from 1944 onwards.); Switzerland (Note: While Switzerland was neutral during the war, allied bombing raids sometimes targeted Swiss targets resulting in fatalities and property damage, The Swiss military, in turn, attacked Allied aircraft overflying Switzerland with fighters and anti-aircraft cannons.)	US-allied victory: The end of America's isolationism after attack on Pearl Harbor in 1941; The United States was first referred to as a superpower in 1944; In July 1945, the United States conducted the first nuclear test, and one month later became the first and only country to use nuclear weapons in war; Collapse of Nazi Germany; The fall of Japanese Empire and Italian Empire; End of Fascism in Europe and Japanese militarism in Asia–Pacific; Emergence of the United States and the Soviet Union as rival superpowers until dissolution of the Soviet Union; The Iron Curtain separated Eastern and Western Europe (1945–1991); Allied Occupation of Germany (1945–1949); American occupation zone in Germany; Allied Occupation of Austria (1945–1955); U.S. Occupation of Japan (1945–1952); U.S. Occupation of Korea (1945–1948); U.S. Army Military Government in Korea; Creation of the United Nations; Creation of the NATO; Creation of the European Coal and Steel Community, which led to the creation of today's European Union; Beginning of the Atomic Age; Beginning of the Cold War (1947–1991)	Franklin D. Roosevelt (March 4, 1933 – April 12, 1945) Harry S. Truman (April 12, 1945 – January 20, 1953)
Operation Beleaguer (1945–1949) Part of the Chinese Civil War and the Cold War Location: Hebei and Shandong provinces, China USS Princeton at anchor in Qingdao during Operation Beleaguer, 1948.	United States; Republic of China	Chinese Communist Party	Inconclusive/Other Result: U.S. withdrawal from China; Japanese and Korean soldiers successfully disarmed and repatriated; Subsequent communist victory	Harry S. Truman (April 12, 1945 – January 20, 1953)
Greek Civil War (1946–1949) Part of the Cold War Location: Greece USS Franklin D. Roosevelt at anchor at Piraeus to support the pro-Western government, September 1946.	Kingdom of Greece Supported by: United Kingdom; United States	Provisional Democratic Government Supported by: Socialist Federal Republic of Yugoslavia; People's Republic of Bulgaria; People's Republic of Albania; Soviet Union	US-allied victory: The Greek government, heavily supported by the United States defeated the communist Democratic Army of Greece, preventing a communist takeover; Indirect U.S. involvement; The U.S., particularly through the CIA, engaged in intelligence gathering and covert efforts to bolster anti-communist forces; American military advisors were sent to Greece to train, reorganize, and provide tactical guidance to the Greek armed forces; The U.S. provided hundreds of millions of dollars in financial assistance and a continuous flow of weapons, aircraft, equipment, and supplies; The war's resolution established the Truman Doctrine as a cornerstone of U.S. foreign policy, marking the beginning of the strategy against global communism; The outcome firmly aligned Greece with the Western sphere of influence, leading to its membership in NATO in 1952	Harry S. Truman (April 12, 1945 – January 20, 1953)
Jeju uprising (U.S. involvement) (1948–1949) Part of the Cold War Location: Jeju Island, South Korea A U.S. military advisor and a military officer discuss anti-guerrilla operations on Jeju, May 15, 1948.	United States; South Korea	Workers' Party of South Korea	Uprising suppressed: The U.S.-backed plan to hold a separate Constitutional Assembly election only in the South of Korea, which many Koreans feared would permanently divide the nation, was a key cause of the rebellion on Jeju island; An estimated 14,000 to 30,000 people were killed, representing about 10% of the island's population; The vast majority of these were civilians killed by South Korean government forces; U.S. military forces had operational control and oversight of South Korean security forces, including the police and military; U.S. officials were aware of and, in some cases authorized the brutal policy that led to the mass killing of civilians; The United States has not officially acknowledged its role or apologized for its involvement in the massacre on Jeju; Establishment of National Committee for Investigation of the Truth about the Jeju 4.3 Events in 2000	Harry S. Truman (April 12, 1945 – January 20, 1953)
Berlin Blockade (1948–1949) Part of the Cold War Location: Germany U.S. Air Force Douglas C-47 transport planes preparing to take off from Berlin Tempelhof Airport during Operation Vittles, August 1948.	United States; United Kingdom; France; Canada; Australia; New Zealand; South Africa	Soviet Union	US-allied victory: The blockade was a Soviet attempt to force the Western Allies out of West Berlin by cutting off all land and water access; Operation Vittles was a massive U.S. humanitarian operation to supply West Berlin; From June 1948 to May 1949, American and British planes flew over 278,000 flights, delivering more than 2.3 million tons of food, fuel, and other goods; 31 American servicemen died during the operation; Successful Berlin Airlift forced the Soviet Union to lift the blockade and reinforced the division of Germany into East and West; The blockade was a key event that worsened tensions between the U.S. and the Soviet Union	Harry S. Truman (April 12, 1945 – January 20, 1953)
Operation Valuable (1949–1956) Part of the Cold War Location: Albania Albanian Sigurimi soldiers with a captured CIA paramilitary soldier during the operation.	United States: CIA; United Kingdom: MI6; France: DGSE; NATO: Italy; West Germany (Note: Formation of the unit Company 4000); Kingdom of Greece; Turkey; Separatists: (Northern Epirus) KEVA Socialist Federal Republic of Yugoslavia Poland	People's Republic of Albania	Communist victory: Failure to overthrow the communist regime of Enver Hoxha in Albania; 300 DGSE, MI6 and CIA agents killed during its duration and another 961 NATO agents and paramilitaries killed or captured	Harry S. Truman (April 12, 1945 – January 20, 1953) Dwight D. Eisenhower (January 20, 1953 – January 20, 1961)
Puerto Rican Nationalist Party insurgency (1950–1954) Part of the Cold War Location: Puerto Rico and Washington, D.C. The 296th Infantry Regiment of the Puerto Rican National Guard occupy Jayuya during the Jayuya uprising.	United States	Puerto Rican Nationalist Party	United States victory: Assassination of Harry S. Truman averted; P-47 Thunderbolts bomb the cities of Jayuya and Utuado; Status referendum vote in 1952 making Puerto Rico a commonwealth; 1954 United States Capitol shooting failed; Insurrection suppressed	Harry S. Truman (April 12, 1945 – January 20, 1953) Dwight D. Eisenhower (January 20, 1953 – January 20, 1961)
Korean War (1950–1953) Part of the Cold War and the Korean conflict Location: Korea U.S. soldier fires a 75mm recoilless rifle, near Oetlook-tong, Korea, in support of infantry units directly across the valley.	South Korea United Nations; United States; United Kingdom; Australia; Belgium; Canada; France; Philippines; Colombia; Ethiopian Empire; Kingdom of Greece; Luxembourg; Netherlands; New Zealand; Spanish State; Union of South Africa; Thailand; Turkey	North Korea China; Soviet Union Supported by: East Germany; Czechoslovak Republic; Hungarian People's Republic; Polish People's Republic; Romanian People's Republic; People's Republic of Bulgaria; Mongolian People's Republic	Inconclusive/Other Result: UNSC Resolution 83 goals achieved; North Korean invasion of South Korea repelled; South Korean statehood preserved; Subsequent United Nations invasion of North Korea repelled; Subsequent Chinese-North Korean invasion of South Korea repelled; Korean Armistice Agreement; Korean Demilitarized Zone established in 1953	Harry S. Truman (April 12, 1945 – January 20, 1953) Dwight D. Eisenhower (January 20, 1953 – January 20, 1961)
Merklín incident (1953) Part of the Cold War Location: Czechoslovakia USAF F-84E Thunderjet used in air battle.	United States	Czechoslovak Republic	Czechoslovak victory: Cold War air-to-air engagement between the air forces of Czechoslovakia and the United States; American F-84 fighter-bomber shot down; The American pilot safely ejected over West Germany	Dwight D. Eisenhower (January 20, 1953 – January 20, 1961)
US aerial operation in the First Indochina War (1954) Part of the Cold War and Indochina Wars Location: French Indochina, modern day Vietnam A painting commemorating the last flight of James B. McGovern Jr. and Wallace Buford's Fairchild C-119 with US Air Force markings painted over with French Air Force roundels, before it was shot down. They were CIA (CAT) contract pilots flying over Diên Biên Phu as part of the CIA air operations.	French Union: France; State of Vietnam; United States: CIA	Democratic Republic of Vietnam: Viet Minh; China	Viet Minh victory: Turning point in the First Indochina War; CIA pilots airdrops of French troops and supplies fail to turn the tide of Dien Bien Phu; French defeat lays the ground work for the more heavily U.S. Involved Second Indochina War/Vietnam War	Dwight D. Eisenhower (January 20, 1953 – January 20, 1961)
First Taiwan Strait Crisis (1954–1955) Part of the Cold War and the Chinese Civil War Location: Taiwan Strait USS Wasp during Operation King Kong, 1955.	Republic of China; United States	People's Republic of China	Inconclusive/Other Result: The crisis began when People's Republic of China began bombarding offshore islands held by the Republic of China; The United States pressured Taiwan to withdraw forces from the strategically difficult-to-defend Dachen Islands; The U.S. Navy assisted in the evacuation of Taiwanese troops and civilians from the islands; The PRC takes control of the Yijiangshan and Dachen Islands; The Eisenhower administration's willingness to consider the use of nuclear weapons played a key role in deterring the PRC and de-escalating the crisis; The crisis led to the formalization of the United States commitment to Taiwan's defense; Formosa Resolution of 1955; Sino-American Mutual Defense Treaty; The crisis ended in a ceasefire, but the fundamental conflict remained unresolved	Dwight D. Eisenhower (January 20, 1953 – January 20, 1961)
Vietnam War (1955–1964 (Note: Advisory role from the forming of the MAAG in Vietnam to the Gulf of Tonkin incident.), 1965–1973 (Note: Direct U.S. involvement ended in 1973 with the Paris Peace Accords. The Paris Peace Accords of January 1973 saw all U.S forces withdrawn; the Case–Church Amendment, passed by the U.S Congress on August 15, 1973, officially ended direct U.S military involvement .), 1974–1975 (Note: The war reignited on December 13, 1974, with offensive operations by North Vietnam, leading to victory over South Vietnam in under five months.)) Part of the Cold War and the Indochina Wars Location: Vietnam, Cambodia, and Laos Bell UH-1 Iroquois flies overhead 1st Cavalry Division during Battle of Ia Drang, 1965.	South Vietnam; United States; South Korea; Australia; New Zealand; Thailand; Philippines; Kingdom of Laos (Cambodia) Khmer Republic	North Vietnam; Viet Cong (Laos) Pathet Lao; Khmer Rouge; China; Soviet Union; North Korea Supported by: East Germany; Czechoslovak Socialist Republic; Hungarian People's Republic; Polish People's Republic; Socialist Republic of Romania; People's Republic of Bulgaria; Cuba	North Vietnam-allied victory: Withdrawal of American forces from Indochina; North Vietnamese victory over South Vietnam; Reunification of North Vietnam and South Vietnam into the communist state Socialist Republic of Vietnam; Communist governments take power also in Laos and Cambodia	Dwight D. Eisenhower (January 20, 1953 – January 20, 1961) John F. Kennedy (January 20, 1961 – November 22, 1963) Lyndon B. Johnson (November 22, 1963 – January 20, 1969) Richard Nixon (January 20, 1969 – August 9, 1974) Gerald Ford (August 9, 1974 – January 20, 1977)
Permesta rebellion (1958–1961) Location: Indonesia The capture of Allen Lawrence Pope.	Permesta; United States	Indonesia	Indonesian government victory: Permesta surrendered to Indonesia government	Dwight D. Eisenhower' (January 20, 1953 – January 20, 1961)
Lebanon crisis (1958) Part of the Cold War Location: Lebanon U.S. Marine sits in a foxhole and points his machine gun toward Beirut, 1958.	Lebanon; United States	(Lebanon) Lebanese opposition: INM; LCP; PSP	US-allied victory: US-Lebanese occupation of the port and international airport of Beirut	Dwight D. Eisenhower (January 20, 1953 – January 20, 1961)
Second Taiwan Strait Crisis (1958) Part of the Cold War and the Chinese Civil War Location: Taiwan Strait Douglas F4D Skyray in flight off Taiwan, 1958.	Republic of China; United States	People's Republic of China	US-allied victory: The crisis was initiated by the People's Republic of China to seize the offshore islands of Kinmen and Matsu; The U.S. deployed additional naval and air forces to the region and supplied the Republic of China with advanced military hardware; The U.S. Navy provided escorts for Republic of China supply convoys, effectively breaking the PRC's naval blockade of Kinmen and Matsu islands; PRC did not fire on them to avoid a direct confrontation with the United States; The Eisenhower administration seriously considered the use of nuclear weapons to defend the islands; The People's Republic of China failed to capture Kinmen and Matsu, and the Republic of China retained control of the islands. The territorial status quo was preserved	Dwight D. Eisenhower (January 20, 1953 – January 20, 1961)
Tibetan uprising (1959) Part of the Cold War and the CIA Tibetan program Location: Tibet Area, China The Dalai Lama with CIA-trained Tibetan guerrillas who protected him during his flight to exile across the Himalayas during Tibetan uprising, March 1959.	Tibetan Army; Chushi Gangdruk Supported by: Republic of China; United States: CIA	People's Republic of China	US-allied defeat: The United States, primarily through the CIA, covertly supported the Tibetan resistance movement by airdropping weapons, ammunition, and supplies to Tibetan fighters; Indirect U.S. involvement; The U.S. trained Tibetan guerrillas in Colorado at a secret facility called Camp Hale; The uprising was suppressed by the Chinese military; Dalai Lama's escape from China to India; The fall of Tibet's government; Tibetan Army dissolved; The United States continued to train agents in the USA and insert them into Tibet until 1972	Dwight D. Eisenhower (January 20, 1953 – January 20, 1961)
Laotian Civil War (1959–1975) Part of the Cold War, the Vietnam War and the Indochina Wars Location: Laos A U.S. Navy McDonnell Douglas F-4 Phantom II in flight over Laos during Operation Barrel Roll, 1966.	Kingdom of Laos; United States; South Vietnam; Thailand; Taiwan	(Laos) Pathet Lao; North Vietnam Supported by: China; Soviet Union; East Germany; Czechoslovak Socialist Republic; Socialist Republic of Romania; Cuba	Pathet Lao-allied victory: The fall of the Kingdom of Laos; Establishment of the communist state Lao People's Democratic Republic	Dwight D. Eisenhower (January 20, 1953 – January 20, 1961) John F. Kennedy (January 20, 1961 – November 22, 1963) Lyndon B. Johnson (November 22, 1963 – January 20, 1969) Richard Nixon (January 20, 1969 – August 9, 1974) Gerald Ford (August 9, 1974 – January 20, 1977)
Guatemalan Civil War (1960–1996) Part of the Cold War and the Central American crisis Location: Guatemala U.S. President Dwight D. Eisenhower (left) with U.S. Secretary of State John Foster Dulles, the advocate of the coup d'état, 1956.	Guatemala Supported by: United States: CIA; Argentina	Guatemalan National Revolutionary Unity; Guatemalan Party of Labour; Revolutionary Movement 13th November; Rebel Armed Forces; Guerrilla Army of the Poor; Revolutionary Organization of Armed People Supported by: Cuba; Farabundo Martí National Liberation Front; Nicaragua	US-allied victory: In 1954, the United States overthrew the democratically elected Guatemalan President Jacobo Árbenz in a CIA-orchestrated coup, ending democracy and installing a military government; Beginning of Civil War in 1960; The U.S. provided significant military aid, weapons, and training to the Guatemalan army throughout the conflict; Indirect U.S. involvement; Guatemalan genocide, committed by U.S.-backed Guatemalan military; The U.S. intervention in Guatemala achieved its geopolitical objectives to prevent the spread of communism	Dwight D. Eisenhower (January 20, 1953 – January 20, 1961) John F. Kennedy (January 20, 1961 – November 22, 1963) Lyndon B. Johnson (November 22, 1963 – January 20, 1969) Richard Nixon (January 20, 1969 – August 9, 1974) Gerald Ford (August 9, 1974 – January 20, 1977) Jimmy Carter (January 20, 1977 – January 20, 1981) Ronald Reagan (January 20, 1981 – January 20, 1989) George H. W. Bush (January 20, 1989 – January 20, 1993) Bill Clinton (January 20, 1993 – January 20, 2001)
Bay of Pigs Invasion (1961) Part of the Cold War and the Consolidation of the Cuban Revolution Location: Cuba A4D-2 Skyhawks in flight over USS Essex during the Bay of Pigs Invasion in April 1961.	(Cuba) CDRF; United States: CIA	Cuba	Cuban government victory: Failure to topple Castro's government; United States sponsored Brigade 2506 (Cuban exiles) defeated; Increased cooperation between Cuba and the Soviet Union	John F. Kennedy (January 20, 1961 – November 22, 1963)
Berlin Crisis (1961) Part of the Cold War Location: Germany U.S. Army M48 tanks face Soviet T-55 tanks at Checkpoint Charlie in Berlin, October 1961.	United States; West Germany Supported by: NATO	Soviet Union; East Germany Supported by: Warsaw Pact	Inconclusive/Other Result: The primary cause was the continuous flow of East Germans, particularly skilled workers and intellectuals, fleeing the communist regime for a better life in West Berlin; Beginning of Operation Stair Step, large-scale mobilization in United States; President John F. Kennedy ordered 148,000 U.S. Guardsmen and Reservists to active duty; 216 aircraft from the tactical fighter units flew to Europe; U.S. Army and Soviet tanks confronted each other at Checkpoint Charlie in Berlin; The crisis culminated in the construction of the Berlin Wall by East Germany, which separated Berlin until the fall of the wall in 1989	John F. Kennedy (January 20, 1961 – November 22, 1963)
Cuban Missile Crisis (1962) Part of the Cold War Location: Cuba U.S. Navy Lockheed P-3A Orion flies over the Soviet ship Metallurg Anosov and destroyer USS Barry, November 1962.	United States; United Kingdom; France; Italy; Turkey	Soviet Union; Cuba	Inconclusive/Other Result: In October 1962, U.S. spy planes discovered that the Soviet Union was secretly installing nuclear missile sites in Cuba, just 90 miles off the coast of Florida; United States implemented a naval blockade of Cuba; U.S. reconnaissance plane was shot down over Cuba; A resolution was reached through a secret agreement between Kennedy and Soviet Premier Nikita Khrushchev; Nuclear war was avoided; Soviet nuclear missiles removed from Cuba; U.S. removed nuclear missiles from Turkey; Establishment of the Moscow–Washington hotline	John F. Kennedy (January 20, 1961 – November 22, 1963)
United States involvement in the Simba rebellion (1964–1966) Part of the Congo Crisis and the Decolonization of Africa during the Cold War Location: First Congolese Republic Belgian paratroopers exiting out of U.S. C-130 Hercules after returning from Operation Dragon Rouge, 1964.	United States: USAF; CIA Operatives; (Cuban exile) "Makasi Pilots; (Cuban exile) Movimiento Recuperación Revolucionaria Belgium Democratic Republic of the Congo; Armed Forces of the Democratic Republic of the Congo; 5 Commando; 6 Commando; 9 Commando; 14 Commando; Codoki Commando; Banyamulenge militias	Simba rebels Cuba; Uganda; Inyenzi movement	US-allied victory Operation Dragon Rouge: Most Hostages rescued; Rebels Defeated; Operation White Giant: Rebel territory captured; Rebel supply routes closed; Operation South: Lake Tanganyika captured; Castro cuts off supplies to Che Guevara; Che Guevara and Cuban forces retreat; Simba rebellion defeated	Lyndon B. Johnson (November 22, 1963 – January 20, 1969)
Dominican Civil War (1965–1966) Part of the Cold War Location: Dominican Republic U.S. soldiers push a child underneath a Jeep to protect him during a firefight in Santo Domingo, 1965.	Dominican Loyalists; United States; IAPF: Brazil; Paraguay; Nicaragua; Costa Rica; El Salvador; Honduras	Dominican Constitutionalists	US-allied victory: The fall of the Bosch regime; Joaquín Balaguer elected as the new president	Lyndon B. Johnson (November 22, 1963 – January 20, 1969)
Korean DMZ Conflict (1966–1969) Part of the Cold War and the Korean conflict Location: Korean Demilitarized Zone ROK and U.S. troop stationed at the DMZ, 1967.	South Korea; United States	North Korea	US-allied victory: North Korean failure to launch an insurgency in South Korea	Lyndon B. Johnson (November 22, 1963 – January 20, 1969) Richard Nixon (January 20, 1969 – August 9, 1974)
Ñancahuazú Guerrilla insurgency (1966–1967) Part of the Cold War Location: Bolivia Che Guevara in Bolivia, 1967.	Bolivia; United States: CIA	National Liberation Army of Bolivia; Cuba	US-allied victory: Che Guevara captured by a U.S.-trained Bolivian special forces and executed; Teoponte Guerrilla established as a successor movement to the National Liberation Army of Bolivia	Lyndon B. Johnson (November 22, 1963 – January 20, 1969)
Cambodian Civil War (1967–1975) Part of the Cold War, the Vietnam War, the Indochina Wars and the Sino-Soviet Split Location: Cambodia Sikorsky CH-53 flies overhead U.S. Marines in Phnom Penh during Operation Eagle Pull, 1975.	Kingdom of Cambodia (1967–1970); Khmer Republic (1970–1975); United States; South Vietnam Supported by: Australia; Canada; France; Thailand	National United Front of Kampuchea; Khmer Rouge; Khmer Rumdo; Khmer Việt Minh; North Vietnam; Việt Cộng Supported by: China; Soviet Union; North Korea; Czechoslovak Socialist Republic; Socialist Republic of Romania; Cuba	Khmer Rouge-allied victory: The fall of the Kingdom of Cambodia; Creation but eventual collapse of the Khmer Republic; Creation of the Democratic Kampuchea; Beginning of the Cambodian genocide	Lyndon B. Johnson (November 22, 1963 – January 20, 1969) Richard Nixon (January 20, 1969 – August 9, 1974) Gerald Ford (August 9, 1974 – January 20, 1977)
US involvement in Angolan Civil War (1975–2002) Part of the Cold War and the Angolan Civil War Location: Angola	Democratic People's Republic of Angola: UNITA; FNLA; South Africa; Zaire; FLEC Supported by: United States: CIA	People's Republic of Angola/Republic of Angola: MPLA; Cuba; SWAPO; ANC; Executive Outcomes; FLNC; Namibia Supported by: Soviet Union; East Germany; North Korea (Note: The North Korean Military Mission in Angola had about 1,500 personnel attached to FAPLA in 1986, most likely advisers, although their exact duties are uncertain. Their presence in Angola may have been indirectly subsidised by the Soviet Union. Up to 3,000 North Korean military personnel served in Angola throughout the 1980s.)	MPLA victory: The Civil War was caused by a violent power struggle between rival liberation movements following the abrupt end of Portuguese colonial rule in 1975; Indirect U.S. involvement; Under Operation IA Feature in 1975, the CIA funneled millions in cash and weapons to rebels, to avoid direct military engagement following the Vietnam War; The U.S. deployed CIA paramilitary experts and funded private contractors to provide training and logistical support; In 1976, American mercenary Daniel Gearhart was captured and executed; In 1976, suspicious of executive overreach, Congress passed the Clark Amendment, which banned all U.S. aid to Angolan factions, halting official involvement for nearly a decade; The Reagan administration resumed massive support for UNITA leader Jonas Savimbi in 1985; Jonas Savimbi killed in 2002; Resistance continue	Gerald Ford (August 9, 1974 – January 20, 1977) Jimmy Carter (January 20, 1977 – January 20, 1981) Ronald Reagan (January 20, 1981 – January 20, 1989) George H. W. Bush (January 20, 1989 – January 20, 1993) Bill Clinton (January 20, 1993 – January 20, 2001) George W. Bush (January 20, 2001 – January 20, 2009)
Mayaguez incident (1975) Part of the aftermath of Cambodian Civil War Location: Cambodia The wreckage of U.S. Air Force CH-53 helicopters lying on Koh Tang's East Beach shortly after the battle.	United States	Democratic Kampuchea	US Victory: Successful release of SS Mayaguez and crew; Captured Marines subsequently executed and bodies not returned	Gerald Ford (August 9, 1974 – January 20, 1977)
Contra War (1979–1990) Part of the Cold War and the Central American crisis Location: Nicaragua USS Saipan underway off the coast of Nicaragua, July 1979.	(Nicaragua) Contras Supported by: United States: CIA; Costa Rica; Israel; Saudi Arabia; Taiwan; Honduras; Panama; Chile; Argentina; Colombia; Imperial State of Iran; Islamic Republic of Iran; Brazil; Brunei; Polish People's Republic; Socialist Republic of Romania; Portugal	Nicaragua: Junta of National Reconstruction; Supported by: Soviet Union; Costa Rica; Libya; Mexico; Cuba; People's Republic of Bulgaria; Czechoslovak Socialist Republic; East Germany; Hungarian People's Republic; Polish People's Republic; North Korea; PLO; Algeria; France; Sweden; Chile; Venezuela; Canada	Inconclusive/Other Result: The United States viewed the socialist Sandinista government, which came to power in 1979, as a Marxist-Leninist threat and a Soviet proxy in Central America; The CIA actively created, funded, and trained the "Contras," a counter-revolutionary rebel group composed of various anti-Sandinista factions, to destabilize the Nicaraguan government; Iran–Contra affair; U.S. mining of Nicaragua's harbors; The International Court of Justice ruled in 1986 that the U.S. had violated international law by funding the Contras and mining Nicaraguan harbors; The removal of the Sandinista government from power in 1990 lasted for 16 years; The war contributed to ongoing poverty, corruption, and instability; The Sandinista National Liberation Front and its leader, Daniel Ortega, returned to power in Nicaragua through the presidential election of 2006	Jimmy Carter (January 20, 1977 – January 20, 1981) Ronald Reagan (January 20, 1981 – January 20, 1989) George H. W. Bush (January 20, 1989 – January 20, 1993)
Salvadoran Civil War (1979–1992) Part of the Cold War and the Central American crisis Location: El Salvador U.S. military adviser Gregory A. Fronius in El Salvador, training a Salvadoran soldier in marksmanship.	El Salvador Supported by: United States: CIA	Farabundo Martí National Liberation Front Supported by: Soviet Union; Cuba (Derg) Ethiopia; Nicaragua	US-allied victory: The United States provided billions of dollars in military hardware, equipment, and funding to the Salvadoran army throughout the 1980s; Hundreds of U.S. military advisers were sent to El Salvador to train the Salvadoran armed forces; The CIA was deeply involved, providing covert support, training, and funding to the U.S.-backed Salvadoran military; A small number of U.S. military advisers and civilians were killed during the conflict; The U.S. successfully prevented a communist takeover in El Salvador	Jimmy Carter (January 20, 1977 – January 20, 1981) Ronald Reagan (January 20, 1981 – January 20, 1989) George H. W. Bush (January 20, 1989 – January 20, 1993)
Operation Cyclone (1979–1992) Part of the Cold War, Soviet–Afghan War, Afghan Civil War (1989–1992), Raids inside the Soviet Union during the Soviet–Afghan War, and the Afghan conflict Location: Afghanistan President Reagan meeting with Afghan Mujahideen leaders in the Oval Office in 1983	Afghan mujahideen Supported by: United States: CIA; Israel: Mossad; United Kingdom: MI6; Switzerland; People's Republic of China; Saudi Arabia; Kuwait; Libya; Egypt; Pakistan; Turkey	Afghanistan; Soviet Union	US-allied victory: The immediate objective of the Operation Cyclone was to make the Soviet-Afghan War as costly as possible for the Soviet Union; Delivery of thousands of tons of weaponry worth several billion U.S. dollars; The CIA was the primary agency responsible for planning, funding, and executing Operation Cyclone, one of its longest and most expensive covert operations; Indirect U.S. involvement, all U.S. support was funneled through Pakistan, allowing the U.S. to maintain deniability; Soviet withdrawal from Afghanistan in February 1989; Soviet defeat helps lead in part to the Revolutions of 1989 and the Dissolution of the Soviet Union; Beginning of Afghan Civil War (1989–1992); The U.S. continued providing aid and training especially for the Battle of Jalalabad, but began to collapse with continued Pakistani Nuclear proliferation; Collapse of the Democratic Republic of Afghanistan in 1992; Aid ends in 1992; Beginning of Afghan Civil War (1992–1996)	Jimmy Carter (January 20, 1977 – January 20, 1981) Ronald Reagan (January 20, 1981 – January 20, 1989) George H. W. Bush (January 20, 1989 – January 20, 1993)
Operation Eagle Claw (1980) Part of the Iran hostage crisis Location: Iran LTV A-7E Corsair II aircraft on the flight deck of the USS Coral Sea with special markings applied for Operation Eagle Claw, 1980.	United States	Iran	Iranian victory: U.S. military rescue mission to free 52 American hostages held at the U.S. Embassy in Tehran, Iran; Mission aborted/rescue mission failed; Helicopter and transport plane crashed killing service members; Intelligence and helicopters abandoned; Jimmy Carter blamed failed mission for loss of election; The American hostages in Iran were not freed until the signing of the Algiers Accords, a series of agreements between the U.S. and Iran in 1981. This agreement officially ended the 444-day Iran hostage crisis.	Jimmy Carter (January 20, 1977 – January 20, 1981)
Gulf of Sidra incident (1981) Part of the Gulf of Sidra incidents and the Cold War Location: Gulf of Sidra, Mediterranean Sea One of the two Grumman F-14 Tomcats on the deck of the USS Nimitz immediately following the incident, 1981.	United States	Libya	US victory: Two Su-22M3 shot down; U.S. Freedom of Navigation asserted	Ronald Reagan (January 20, 1981 – January 20, 1989)
Multinational intervention in Lebanon (1982–1984) Location: Lebanon A U.S. Marine Corps Bell AH-1T Sea Cobra helicopter on patrol outside the city of Beirut, 1982.	Lebanese Armed Forces UNIFIL; Multinational Force in Lebanon: United States; France; United Kingdom; Italy; Israel Lebanese Front; Army of Free Lebanon; SLA	Lebanese National Movement; Jammoul; PLO Amal Movement Iran: Islamic Revolutionary Guard Corps; Hezbollah; Islamic Jihad Organization Islamic Unification Movement Syria Arab Deterrent Force: Saudi Arabia; Sudan; United Arab Emirates; Libya; South Yemen	Syrian-allied victory: Multinational forces fail to prevent collapse of Lebanese Army into Syrian- or Israeli- supported militias; Multinational forces evacuated after the U.S. Embassy and US Marine barracks are bombed by the Islamic Jihad Organization; Multinational forces oversee withdrawal of Palestine Liberation Organization; Humanitarian crisis in Southern Lebanon; Civil war continues until 1990; President Hafez al-Assad continues his occupation of Lebanon until his son and later president Bashar al-Assad orders a withdrawal from the country	Ronald Reagan (January 20, 1981 – January 20, 1989)
United States invasion of Grenada (1983) Part of the Cold War Location: Grenada U.S. soldiers in artillery positions at Grenada during Operation Urgent Fury, 1983.	United States; Barbados; Jamaica; Antigua and Barbuda; Dominica; Saint Kitts and Nevis; Saint Lucia; Saint Vincent and the Grenadines	PRG of Grenada; Cuba; Soviet Union	US-allied victory: Military dictatorship of Hudson Austin deposed; Defeat of Cuban military presence; Restoration of constitutional government	Ronald Reagan (January 20, 1981 – January 20, 1989)
Operation Prairie Fire (1986) Part of the Gulf of Sidra incidents and the Cold War Location: Gulf of Sidra, Mediterranean Sea McDonnell Douglas F/A-18 Hornet lands on USS Coral Sea during Operation Prairie Fire.	United States	Libya	US victory: Several Libyan ships destroyed or damaged; U.S. Freedom of Navigation asserted	Ronald Reagan (January 20, 1981 – January 20, 1989)
Bombing of Libya (1986) Part of the Cold War Location: Libya USS America prepares to launch an Grumman F-14 Tomcat off the coast of Libya during Operation El Dorado Canyon, 1986.	United States	Libya	Inconclusive: Both sides claimed victory; Failed Libyan Scud missile response; Muammar Gaddafi survives; U.S. successfully destroyed Libyan ground targets in response to the West Berlin discotheque bombing	Ronald Reagan (January 20, 1981 – January 20, 1989)
Tanker War (1987–1988) Part of the Iran–Iraq War Location: Persian Gulf, Strait of Hormuz and Sea of Oman LTV A-7E Corsair II is launched from the USS Enterprise during Operation Praying Mantis, 1988.	United States	Iran	US victory: Consisting of several military operations including: Operation Earnest Will, Operation Nimble Archer and Operation Prime Chance; U.S. Navy sinks several ships and damages Iranian military installations used to attack U.S. and U.S. allied civilian shipping; U.S. Navy vessel USS Vincennes shoots down civilian Iran Air Flight 655 killing all 290 passengers, among them 66 children; Iran–Iraq War ends in August 1988 following UN enforcement of the ceasefire	Ronald Reagan (January 20, 1981 – January 20, 1989)
Operation Golden Pheasant (1988) Part of the Cold War and the Contra War Location: Honduras Members of the U.S. Army jump from Lockheed C-141B Starlifter aircraft in Honduras, March 1988.	United States; Honduras	Nicaragua	US-allied victory: The operation took place during the Contra War, where the U.S. was supporting the Contra rebels in their fight against the Sandinista government of Nicaragua; The Sandinista army launched a major offensive, codenamed "Operation Danto 88", to destroy Contra supply depots located in Honduras; Direct U.S. intervention; The deployment of U.S. Army soldiers, ready to fight, forced the Sandinistas to withdraw across their border	Ronald Reagan (January 20, 1981 – January 20, 1989)
Gulf of Sidra Tobruk incident (1989) Part of the Gulf of Sidra incidents and the Cold War Location: Mediterranean Sea Two Grumman F-14 Tomcats used in air battle.	United States	Libya	US victory: Two Libyan MiG-23ML fighters shot down; U.S. Freedom of Navigation asserted	Ronald Reagan (January 20, 1981 – January 20, 1989)
United States invasion of Panama (1989–1990) Part of the Cold War and the war on drugs Location: Panama A U.S. Army M113 armored personnel carrier guards a street near the destroyed Panamanian Defense Force headquarters building during Operation Just Cause, 1989.	United States; Panamanian Opposition	Panama	US-allied victory: United States invaded Panama to capture dictator Manuel Noriega and bring him to the United States to face drug trafficking charges; Dictator Manuel Noriega was captured during Operation Nifty Package by Delta Force and Navy SEALs	George H. W. Bush (January 20, 1989 – January 20, 1993)
Gulf War (1990–1991) Part of the Cold War Location: Iraq, Kuwait, Saudi Arabia, Persian Gulf and Israel M1 Abrams tanks of the 3rd Armored Division advance on Medina Ridge, 1991.	United States; United Kingdom; Kuwait; Saudi Arabia; France; Canada; Egypt; Syria; Qatar; Bahrain; United Arab Emirates; Oman	Iraq	US-allied victory: The Gulf War began with Saddam Hussein's invasion of Kuwait in August 1990; The United States led a massive international coalition to deploy forces in Operation Desert Shield; Operation Desert Storm was the swift, decisive air and 100-hour ground campaign; Iraqi withdrawal from Kuwait; Emir Jaber III restored; Saddam Hussein remained the president of Iraq; Sanctions against Iraq	George H. W. Bush (January 20, 1989 – January 20, 1993)
Iraqi No-Fly Zone Enforcement Operations (1991–2003) Part of the prelude to the Iraq War Location: Iraq A Tomahawk cruise missile is fired from an Arleigh Burke-class destroyer during Operation Desert Fox, 1998.	United States; United Kingdom; France; Australia; Belgium; Netherlands; Saudi Arabia; Turkey; Italy	Iraq	US-allied victory: Periodic depletion of Iraqi air defenses; Operation Provide Comfort, Kurdish refugees successfully defended and the Iraqi Kurdistan Region becomes de facto autonomous	George H. W. Bush (January 20, 1989 – January 20, 1993) Bill Clinton (January 20, 1993 – January 20, 2001) George W. Bush (January 20, 2001 – January 20, 2009)
First U.S. Intervention in the Somali Civil War (1992–1995) Part of the Somali Civil War and the United Nations Operation in Somalia II mission Location: Somalia A U.S. Marine Light Armored Vehicle 25 and Italian Soldiers in a Fiat CM6614 Armored Personnel Carrier (right) on patrol in Mogadishu, 1993.	United States; United Kingdom; Spain; Saudi Arabia; Malaysia; Pakistan; Italy; India; Greece; Germany; France; Canada; Botswana; Belgium; Australia; New Zealand	(Somalia) Somali National Alliance	Somali victory: Failure to capture SNA leader Mohamed Farrah Aidid; specific Aidid lieutenants captured; Withdrawal of U.S. forces 5 months after losses in the Battle of Mogadishu; The UN mandate saved close to 100,000 lives, before and after U.S. withdrawal; Civil war is ongoing	George H. W. Bush (January 20, 1989 – January 20, 1993) Bill Clinton (January 20, 1993 – January 20, 2001)
NATO intervention in Bosnia and Herzegovina (1992–1995) Part of the Bosnian War and Yugoslav Wars Location: Bosnia and Herzegovina A U.S. Army M113 armored personnel carrier prepares to pull an armored Humvee out of the mud in Bosnia and Herzegovina.	Bosnia and Herzegovina NATO: United States; Belgium; Canada; Denmark; France; Germany; Italy; Luxembourg; Netherlands; Norway; Portugal; Spain; Turkey; United Kingdom	Republika Srpska; Republic of Serbian Krajina; Autonomous Province of Western Bosnia	US-allied victory: NATO enforced a UN-sanctioned no-fly zone (Operation Deny Flight) and a naval blockade (Operation Sharp Guard) to enforce sanctions and an arms embargo; NATO jets conducted combat operations, including shooting down planes that violated the no-fly zone; The Operation Deliberate Force air campaign in 1995 targeted Bosnian Serb military positions and was crucial in bringing them to the negotiating table; Dayton Peace Agreement; High Representative for Bosnia and Herzegovina established to implement the peace agreement; International recognition of Bosnia and Herzegovina as a sovereign state; Deployment of NATO-led peace forces; IFOR (1995–1996); SFOR (1996–2004); Deployment of EU-led peace forces; Operation Althea (2004–present); NATO successfully achieved its military and peacekeeping objectives	George H. W. Bush (January 20, 1989 – January 20, 1993) Bill Clinton (January 20, 1993 – January 20, 2001)
Intervention in Haiti (1994–1995) Location: Haiti U.S. Marine guarding an area in Haiti during Operation Uphold Democracy, 1994.	United States; Poland; Argentina	Haiti	US-allied victory: Reinstatement of Jean-Bertrand Aristide as president of Haiti	Bill Clinton (January 20, 1993 – January 20, 2001)
Third Taiwan Strait Crisis (1995–1996) Part of the Chinese Civil War Location: Taiwan Strait USS Independence underway during the Third Taiwan Strait Crisis, March 1996	Republic of China; United States	People's Republic of China	US-allied victory: The crisis was triggered by China's military response to Taiwanese President Lee Teng-hui's visit to the United States in 1995, which China perceived as a significant step toward Taiwanese independence; People's Republic of China conducted a series of large-scale military exercises and ballistic missile tests in the waters surrounding Taiwan; The U.S. deployed two aircraft carrier battle groups, the USS Nimitz and the USS Independence, largest display of U.S. naval power in the region since the Vietnam War; The Crisis ended with the de-escalation of military tensions after the U.S. deployed aircraft carriers	Bill Clinton (January 20, 1993 – January 20, 2001)
Monrovia clashes (1998) Part of the aftermath of the First Liberian Civil War and the build up to the Second Liberian Civil War Location: Liberia The U.S. Embassy in Monrovia.	Liberia: Johnson's forces; Limited involvement: United States; Nigeria: Nigerian ECOMOG peacekeepers	Liberia: Liberian government	US victory for its purposes (Note: The United States was neutral in this conflict, up until Roosevelt Johnson and some of his surviving followers fled to the U.S. Embassy in Monrovia. Its goal after that was to protect the Embassy and the refugees it provided sanctuary for. Its goal was not to win the conflict for Johnson.): Limited U.S. involvement; The U.S. Embassy in Monrovia defended; Most of Johnson's Krahn fighters are killed; Roosevelt Johnson and his surviving followers are evacuated to Ghana; The Killing of the Krahn helped lead to the Second Liberian Civil War	Bill Clinton (January 20, 1993 – January 20, 2001)
Operation Infinite Reach (1998) Part of the Afghan conflict, the Prelude to the War in Afghanistan (2001–2021), and the Second Sudanese Civil War Location: Sudan and Afghanistan The U.S. Embassy in Dar es Salaam, after the al-Qaeda bombing, August 1998.	United States	al-Qaeda Pakistan Sudan	al–Qaeda victory: Incident triggered by the U.S. Embassy bombings in Dar es Salaam, Tanzania and Nairobi, Kenya; Cruise missile strikes in Sudan and Afghanistan; Al-Shifa plant destroyed based on bad intelligence with civilian casualties; Afghan jihadist camp damaged, but repaired in two weeks with light casualties; 5 Pakistani ISI officers killed; Osama bin Laden survived; Taliban refuse to give up bin Laden and made deeper ties with al–Qaeda after the attack; U.S. Pakistan relations worsen	Bill Clinton (January 20, 1993 – January 20, 2001)
NATO intervention in Kosovo War (1999) Part of the Kosovo War and Yugoslav Wars Location: Serbia and Kosovo A U.S. Air Force F-15E Strike Eagle takes off for an air strike mission during Operation Allied Force, 1999.	KLA: (Albania) AFRK; NATO: United States; Belgium; Canada; Denmark; France; Germany; Italy; Netherlands; Norway; Portugal; Spain; Turkey; United Kingdom	Federal Republic of Yugoslavia	US-allied victory: A sustained NATO air campaign targeting Serbian forces and infrastructure to force their withdrawal from Kosovo; The bombing lasted for nearly 3 months before all sides accepted the Kumanovo Treaty which ended the Kosovo War; Deployment of NATO-led peace forces; KFOR (1999–present); Yugoslav forces pull out of Kosovo; De facto separation of Kosovo from FR Yugoslavia under UN administration; Return of Albanian refugees after attempted ethnic cleansing of Albanians; The legitimacy of the NATO air campaign has been questioned, as too was the number of civilian casualties in the operation	Bill Clinton (January 20, 1993 – January 20, 2001)

== See also ==
- List of notable deployments of U.S. military forces overseas
- Timeline of United States military operations
- Military history of the United States
- United States Armed Forces
- List of American military installations
- List of United States drone bases
- Perdicaris affair
- USS Liberty incident
- USS Stark incident
- USS Pueblo incident

== Bibliography ==
- Leonhard, Jörn (2018). Pandora's Box: A History of the First World War. Translated by Camiller, Patrick. Cambridge, Massachusetts: The Belknap press. ISBN 9780674545113.
