= Bombing of Yugoslavia =

Bombing of Yugoslavia may refer to:

- German bombing of Belgrade, by Nazi Germany during the invasion of the Kingdom of Yugoslavia
- Allied bombing of Yugoslavia in World War II, various periods from 1941 to 1945
- NATO bombing of Yugoslavia, 1999
