= Mosquito Down =

- Author: Frank Dell and Brett Piper
- Publisher: Fighting High Publishing

Mosquito Down is a 2014 book by Frank Dell and Brett Piper. It is an account of Dell's time during World War II with Bomber Command of the Royal Air Force flying a de Havilland Mosquito bomber, being shot down over Germany, and his time with the Dutch resistance in 1944–1945.
