= Bomber Command =

Military unit type and size designation

Bomber Command is an organisational military unit, generally subordinate to the air force of a country. The best known were in Britain and the United States. A Bomber Command is generally used for strategic bombing (although at times, e.g. during the Normandy Landings, may be used for tactical bombing), and is composed of bombers (i.e. planes used to bomb targets).

== RAF Bomber Command ==
RAF Bomber Command was formed in 1936 to be responsible for all bombing activities of the RAF. It found especial fame during World War II, when its aircraft were used for devastating night-time air raids on Germany and occupied Europe, principally the former, their bombing raids causing tremendous destruction of urban areas and factories.

Much of its personnel was drawn from outside the United Kingdom, many coming from the British Empire. Under the British Commonwealth Air Training Plan, many Commonwealth countries contributed squadrons or individuals to British air and ground staff. For example, No. 6 Group, which represented about one-sixth of Bomber Command's strength, was a Royal Canadian Air Force unit. Some non-British personnel came from occupied European countries.

At its height, Bomber Command under Air Chief Marshal Sir Arthur "Bomber" Harris could put over 1,000 aircraft into the air over Germany. Over 12,000 Bomber Command aircraft were shot down during World War II, and 55,500 aircrew were killed, the highest attrition rate of any British unit.

Various aircraft were used, from the obsolete and horrendously vulnerable Fairey Battle in 1939 to the command's most numerous and successful aircraft, the Avro Lancaster. Bomber Command used British aircraft and American-built machines such as the Boeing B-17 Flying Fortress and Consolidated B-24 Liberator. Less than 2% of Bomber Command's wartime sorties were flown by US-built aircraft. UK lend-lease B-17s were the first to be put into battle and gave useful information on improvements before the US entered the war.

In 1968, RAF Bomber Command was merged into RAF Strike Command.

== USAAF ==
Whereas the Bomber Command in the RAF was a single organisation, reporting directly to the Chief of the Air Staff, there were many American Bomber Commands. They were subordinate formations, reporting in general to various numbered Air Forces around the world. Out of those organisations, four were tasked with strategic bombing of Germany and Japan. VIII Bomber Command, IX Bomber Command, XX Bomber Command and XXI Bomber Command.

=== VIII Bomber Command ===
VIII Bomber Command was the UK-based strategic bomber arm of the Eighth Air Force and contributed a substantial part of Operation Pointblank, the day-night bombing campaign by the RAF and USAAF to eliminate the Luftwaffe in preparation for the invasion of Europe. Two aircraft, the Boeing B-17 Flying Fortress, and the Consolidated B-24 Liberator, were the mainstays of this command. The B-17 was more highly regarded, but the Liberator had a greater range and a larger bomb load. VIII Bomber Command, known as "Pinetree", began strategic operations in Europe on 17 August 1942, with daylight missions on the precept that daylight attacks were more accurate than night attacks.

The RAF and the Luftwaffe had both tried daylight bombing early in the war and abandoned it in the face of serious losses. Until June, 1943, VIII Bomber Command could not mount missions of more than 100 aircraft and consequently limited targets to those in Occupied France and the Low Countries, and to shallow penetrations of Germany. Attempts to attack the German aircraft industry during the summer and fall of 1943, beyond the range of escort fighters, resulted in critical losses of aircrew.

Daylight bombing became effective when long range escort fighters such as the North American P-51 Mustang became available in sizeable numbers. In January 1944, VIII Bomber Command was re-designated the 8th Air Force when the United States Strategic Air Forces came into being to coordinate the combined efforts of the 8th and the 15th Air Force in Italy.

=== IX Bomber Command ===
IX Bomber Command was part of the Ninth Air Force and had started life as the heavy bomber unit contingent of the U.S. Army Forces in the Middle East (USAFIME) fighting in the Egypt-Libya Campaign during 1942. When in 1943, the Ninth Air Force moved from the Mediterranean Theater of Operations to the United Kingdom to become a tactical air force in the European Theater of Operations, the B-24s transferred to Twelfth Air Force, then to the newly created Fifteenth. IX Bomber Command equipped with Martin B-26 medium bombers and Douglas A-20 light bombers in preparation for the Normandy Invasion.

=== XX Bomber Command ===
XX Bomber Command was part of the Twentieth Air Force and flew missions from China against mainland Japan in Operation Matterhorn.

The forward airbases in China were supplied out of India by the flying supplies over the Hump from India.

The key development for bombing Japan was the Boeing B-29, with an operational range of 1,500 miles (2,400 km); almost 90% of the bombs dropped on Japan's Home Islands (147,000 tons) were delivered by B-29s. The first mission from China was on June 15, 1944, from Chengdu, over 1,500 miles away. This first attack was not particularly damaging to Japan. Forty-seven of the sixty-eight B–29s airborne hit the target area in Tokyo. Four aborted with mechanical problems, four crashed, six jettisoned their bombs because of mechanical difficulties. Others bombed secondary targets or targets of opportunity. One B–29 was lost to enemy aircraft.

Bombing from China was never a satisfactory arrangement because not only were the Chinese forward airbases difficult to supply via "The Hump" (as the Himalayas' foothills were called), but the B-29s operating from them could only reach Japan if they substituted some of the bomb load for extra fuel tanks in the bomb-bays. When Admiral Chester Nimitz's island-hopping campaign captured islands close enough to Japan to be within the range of B-29s, XXI Bomber Command commanded Twentieth Air Force units flying from the islands in a much more effective bombing campaign of the Japanese home islands.

=== XXI Bomber Command ===
In the Pacific, XXI Bomber Command was also part of the Twentieth Air Force. It was the main instrument of destruction used against Japan. Its B-29 Superfortresses, operating from the Marianas, were the longest range and most modern bomber in service in the world at the time, although not developed until almost the end of the war. As in Europe, the USAAF tried daylight precision bombing. It proved inconclusive because of poor weather conditions, jet stream over Japan that severely affected both aircraft and bomb drops, and inadequately trained crews.

Twentieth Air Force commander and AAF Commanding General Henry H. Arnold grew impatient with a lack of discernible results, and replaced General Haywood S. Hansell with General Curtis LeMay as commander of XXI Bomber Command on January 21, 1945. After six weeks of further attempts at precision bombing, LeMay acceded to command pressures for area bombing and switched in March to mass firebombing attacks by night from low level. The Japanese economy was uniquely vulnerable to this sort of attack, the cities being closely packed and largely built of wood, and manufacturing being 90% cottage industry.

The air attacks on Japan included the most devastating single air raid in history. It was not, as some might think, the result of dropping the atomic bombs on Hiroshima and Nagasaki. It was a firebombing of Tokyo on the night of 9–10 March 1945, which created a conflagration and killed 100,000 people and destroyed 16 square miles of the city, far more damage and deaths than either the atomic bombing of Hiroshima or of Nagasaki.
