= Bombing of Belgrade (1944) =

Part of World War II

- Part of the Allied bombing of Yugoslavia in World War II
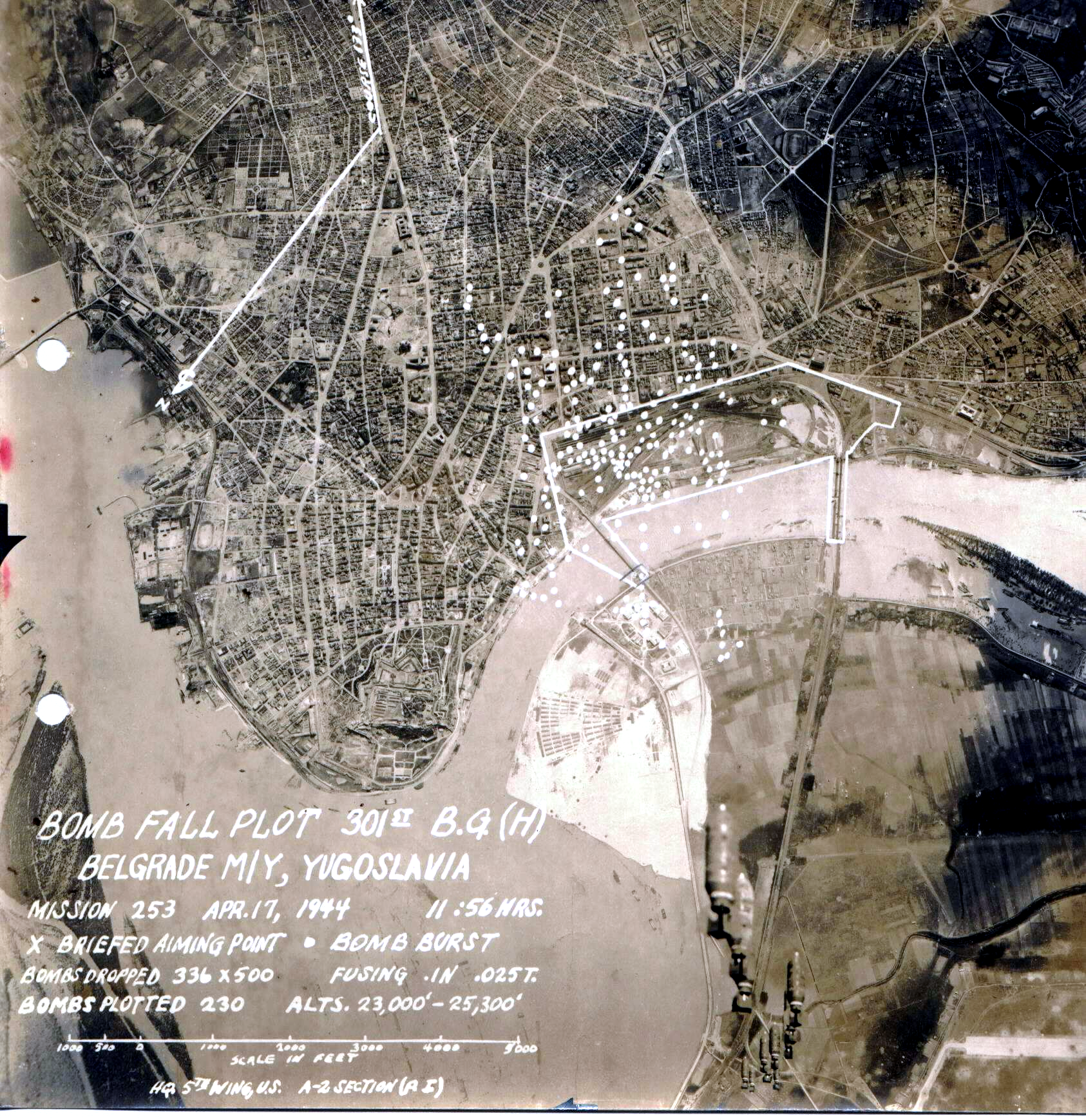
- Map of 17 April 1944 bombing of Belgrade
Date	16 April – 6 September 1944 (4 months and 3 weeks)
Location	Belgrade, German-occupied Serbia 44°49′04″N 20°27′25″E
Result	Widespread destruction and civilian casualties

Belligerents
Allies; United States; United Kingdom	Axis; Germany: Government of National Salvation; Italian Social Republic

Units involved
Fifteenth Air Force	

Strength
600 bombers	

Casualties and losses
None	343 German and 96 Italian soldiers killed
- 2,271 – 4,700 civilians killed

The Allies carried out an aerial bombing campaign against the Axis in Belgrade during the Allied bombing of Yugoslavia in World War II. The air strikes lasted from 16 April 1944 to 6 September 1944.

Belgrade was bombed eleven times by the Anglo–American air force. Infrastructure in Belgrade was bombed three times in April, twice in May, once in June and July and four times in September 1944. The heaviest casualties were recorded during the April bombing on 16 April and 17 April 1944, which coincided with the first and second days of Orthodox Easter that year. The main unit in this action was the American Fifteenth Air Force, with a base in Foggia in the south of Italy. 600 bombers took part, dropping carpet bombs from 3,000 – 5,000 metres. There was no anti-aircraft defense. Several people died on 16 April. The population of Belgrade at the time believed that the bombing was an introduction to an Allied military invasion. The bombing continued with greater intensity on 17 April, when the Sajmište concentration camp was hit where 60 detainees were killed and about 150 wounded in the camp.

Belgrade was bombed again by the Allies on 21 April, 24 April, 18 May, 6 June, 8 July, and 6 September 1944.

== Bombing ==
Belgrade was bombed by the Royal Air Force and United States Army Air Forces between 16 and 17 April 1944, on the Orthodox Easter Day. The largest unit that took part was the American Fifteenth Air Force, based in Foggia in the south of Italy. This carpet bombing raid was executed by 600 aircraft flying at high altitude. Civilian casualties were as many as 1,160, while German military losses were 18, or some 1,200 killed in total. 5,000 people were wounded.

Though officially only military and industrial targets were picked – factories, bridges, airport, ammunition depots, Axis barracks and garrisons - the precision of bombing was notoriously bad. Areas in the city centre hit by bombs on 16 April included the Palace Albanija, the National Theater in Belgrade, Terazije, the area around the Belgrade Main railway station and the Krunski Venac neighborhood. Bombed areas of the wider Belgrade metropolis included Dorćol, which was mostly destroyed, together with parts of Vračar, Pašino Brdo, and Dušanovac, all suburbs at the time, which contained no factories or military targets.

When the bombing was continued the next day, the remains of the King Alexander Bridge, partially destroyed in April 1941, were bombed. Bombs were mostly concentrated on the bank areas of the city, including the Sajmište concentration camp, which was part of the Independent State of Croatia at the time; approximately 100 prisoners were killed in the bombing. Some citizens went to air raid shelters but others fled the city, hiding in the woods or surrounding villages. Some 1,500 tons of bombs were used in the bombing.

Other locations hit in the bombing raids Kalenić market, the Central hygienic institute, the Hospital for infectious diseases, the Home for the blind, the Labor market, the Orthopedic institute, both state orphanages (for boys and for girls), two homes for the children of refugees from other parts of Yugoslavia, the Children's hospital, and the Children's dispensary. All bridges were damaged again, as were the railway stations in Topčider and Rakovica, Post Office No. 2, the fabrics factory of Vlada Ilić in Karaburma, the faculty of technical engineering, Vajfert's brewery, and the University campus.

== See also ==
- Air warfare in Yugoslavia (1941–1945)
- Operation Ratweek (1944)
