= Allied bombing of Yugoslavia in World War II =

Allied bombing of Yugoslavia
- Part of World War II in Yugoslavia
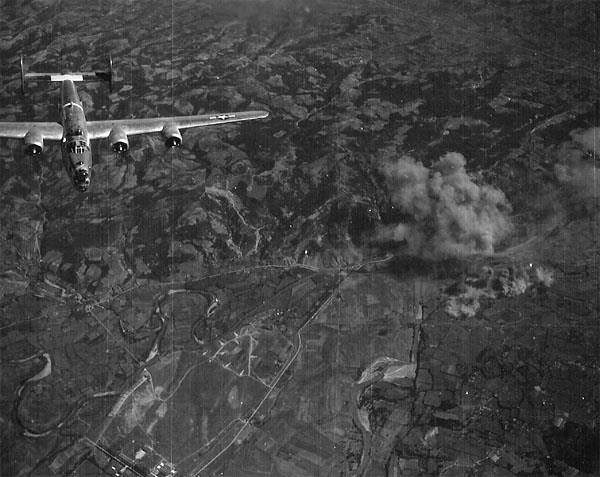
Date	20 October 1943 – 18 September 1944
Location	Kingdom of Yugoslavia 44°49′N 20°28′E

Belligerents
Allies; United States; United Kingdom; Soviet Union; Italy	Axis; Germany: Government of National Salvation; Independent State of Croatia

Units involved
United States Air Force; Royal Air Force; Balkan Air Force; Italian Co-belligerent Air Force	Luftwaffe

The Allied bombing of Yugoslavia in World War II involved air attacks on cities and towns in the Kingdom of Yugoslavia by the United States Army Air Force (USAAF) and Royal Air Force (RAF), including the Balkan Air Force (BAF), between 1941 and 1945, during which period the entire country was occupied by the Axis powers. Dozens of Yugoslav cities and towns were bombed, many repeatedly. These attacks included intensive air support for Yugoslav Partisan operations in May–June 1944, and a bombing campaign against transport infrastructure in September 1944 as the German Wehrmacht withdrew from Greece and Yugoslavia. This latter operation was known as Operation Ratweek. Some of the attacks caused significant civilian casualties.

== First bombings ==
The bombings of Serbia and Montenegro lasted from 20 October 1943 to 18 September 1944. Especially hit was the industrial town of Niš in south Serbia. The bombing began on 20 October 1943, instantly killing 250 people. German forces in town were barely affected. Niš was bombed 15 times in total. The greatest devastation was in the most destitute parts of the town, along the railroad.

== Easter bombings ==
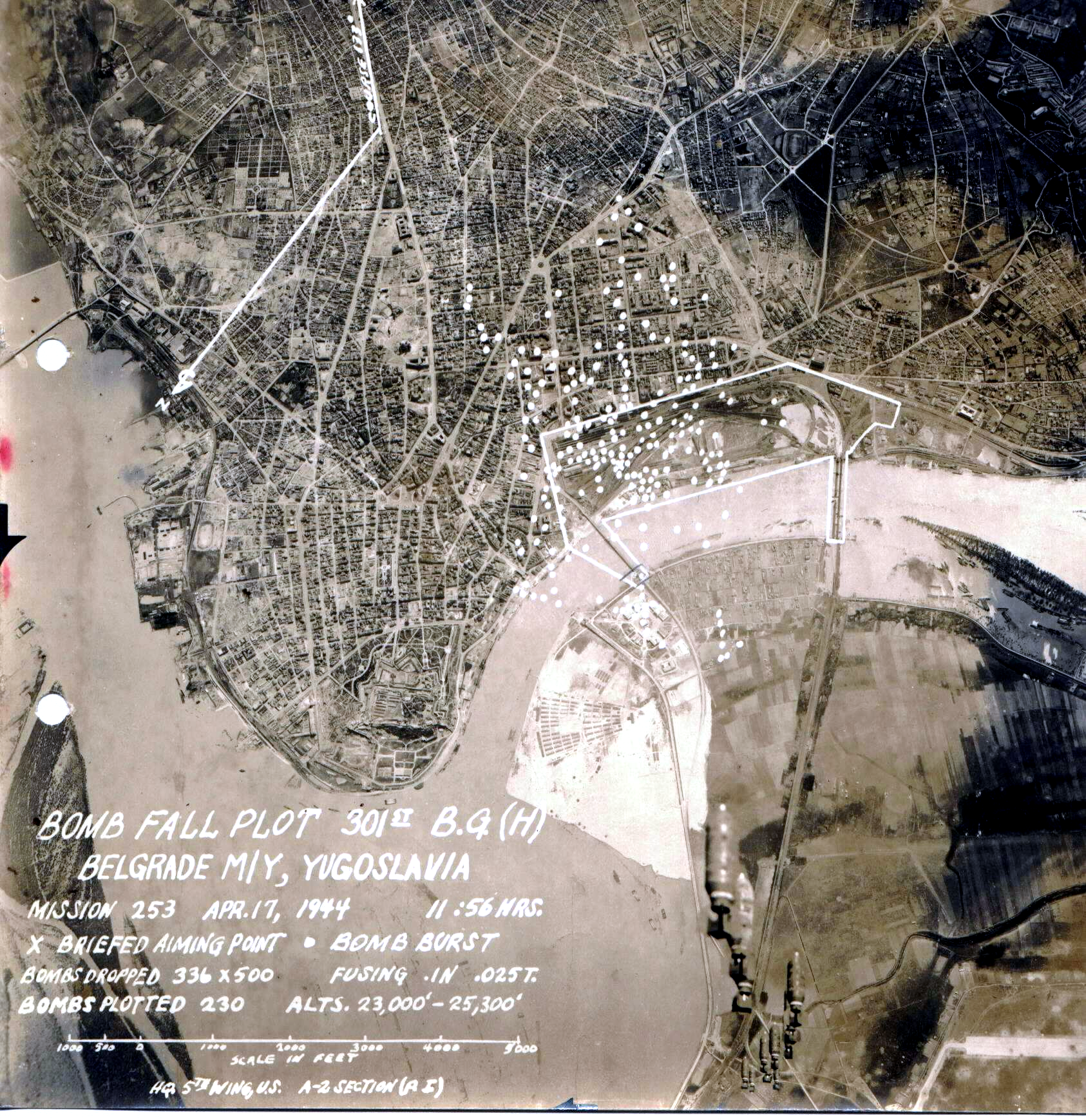
Map of 17 April 1944 bombing of Belgrade

Belgrade was bombed by British and American air forces on 16–17 April 1944, which was Orthodox Easter Day. The largest unit that took part was the American 15th Air Force, based in Foggia in the south of Italy. This carpet bombing raid was executed by 600 aircraft flying at high altitude. Civilian casualties were as many as 1,160, while German military losses were 18, or some 1,200 killed in total. 5,000 people were wounded. Among the sites in downtown Belgrade which were struck on 16 April were Palace Albanija, the National Theater in Belgrade, the Terazije square, the Bajloni market, the area around the Belgrade Main railway station, Krunski Venac (including the maternity hospital where several mothers who had just given birth were killed with their babies), a large number of hospitals, schools and kindergartens. Bombed areas of central Belgrade also included Dorćol, which was heavily destroyed, parts of Vračar and Pašino Brdo and Dušanovac, suburbs at the time, which contained no factories or military targets.

When the bombing was continued the next day, the remains of the King Alexander Bridge, partially destroyed in April 1941, were bombed. Hits were mostly concentrated on the bank areas of the city, including the Sajmište concentration camp, part of the Independent State of Croatia at the time. Some 100 prisoners were killed in the bombing. Some citizens hid in bomb shelters whilst others fled the city, seeking refuge in surrounding villages and forests. Some 1,500 tons of bombs were used in the bombing.

Other targets included Kalenić market, Central hygienic institute, Hospital for infectious diseases, Home for the blind, Labor market, Orthopedic institute, both state orphanages, for boys and girls, two homes for the children of the refugees from other parts of Yugoslavia, Children's hospital, Children's dispensary, all bridges were damaged again, railway stations in Topčider and Rakovica, Post Office No. 2, Fabrics factory of Vlada Ilić in Karaburma, Faculty of technical engineering, Vajfert's brewery, University campus. The city was crippled, yet German military objects were almost unharmed and they made only 1.5% of the fatalities.

One epitaph on the tombstone on Belgrade New Cemetery says: "They hoped to get freedom from the English, not knowing that hope leads them directly into death".

Part of the Easter raid were also numerous towns in Montenegro and Herzegovina: Cetinje, Žabljak, Šavnik, Kolašin, Andrijevica, Gacko and Bileća.

== Later bombings ==
From April to September 1944, Belgrade was bombed 11 times. In this period, a number of other Serbian towns including some quite small, were bombed: Kraljevo (6 times), Zemun (4 times), Alibunar (4 times), Novi Sad (3 times), Smederevo (2 times), Ćuprija (2 times), Popovac (2 times), Leskovac, Kragujevac, Kruševac, Smederevska Palanka, Gornji Milanovac, Sremska Mitrovica, Ruma, Veliki Bečkerek, Peć, Kovin, Pančevo, Velika Plana, Prijepolje, Kuršumlija, Prokuplje, Vučje, Lebane, Grdelica, Podujevo, Raška, Stalać, Kosovska Mitrovica, Priština. Belgrade was bombed again on 6 and 8 September 1944 with about 120 Flying Fortresses, also from the US 15th Air Force, which were accompanied by fighter planes.

Niš was bombed again on 30 March 1944. It took six days to find all the wounded and killed and remove them from the rubble. Town was bombed again on 5 April. This time, the Allies used 248 bombs, killed 88 and wounded 184 people. Cathedral church was hit and the bombs destroyed the city cemetery, blowing up the collective tombs of the previous victims of the bombing. Leskovac was bombed on 6 September. Described as "day of hell", the post-attack situation was described as "if the entire Leskovac lifted up in the whirlwind of dust, smoke and rubble".

Allied aircraft bombed Maribor, present day Slovenia on some 50 occasions. American 15th Air Force twice bombed German facilities in Maribor, where aircraft engines were manufactured. Those attacks were conducted on 7 January and 6 November 1944.

In 1944, town of Nikšić in Montenegro was bombed. 500 people were killed in the first attack. Radio London reported: "During the attack on Nikšić, block bombs of 2 tons were used. Half of the town was demolished or damaged. Nikšić was bombed on the request of Marshall Tito." On 5 May Podgorica was bombed again (in total, 4 times). One sixth of the population was killed while 4,500 were wounded. Other towns in Montenegro and surrounding areas of Serbia and Herzegovina which were bombed included Sjenica and Bijelo Polje.

In late 1944, as the Soviet 3rd Ukrainian Front entered Yugoslavia from Bulgaria to conduct Belgrade Offensive alongside Yugoslav and Bulgarian formations its 17th Air Army conducted numerous ground attacks on many German-held targets in the occupied Yugoslavia in support of the operation. At one point, in a case of friendly fire, a unit of marauding US P-38 fighter-bombers attacked an advancing Soviet column mistaking it for retreating Germans, with the Soviets requesting fighter cover form their own air force - resulting in Air battle over Niš.

== Assessment ==
Official Yugoslav historiography did not explore the Allied bombings after 1945, but the official stand was that it had to happen, in order to destroy the remaining occupational forces. Modern historians tend to disagree, giving a number of reasons: in that particular period of the World War II, Yugoslav front was not a location of important military operations, number of German forces was not high and they mostly consisted of Third Call regiments, Italy had already switched to Allies' side and Yugoslav Partisans were still concentrated outside of all major urban centers where majority of firefights in the country took place.

Josip Broz Tito was declared a marshal in November 1943, Churchill and Stalin agreed on division of the zones of interest while Serbia was for the most part Partisan free, with sizeable presence of the Četniks. It is believed that the combined effect of all these reasons was behind the bombing. Tito and his General Staff were sending targets to the Allied command. Lawyer Smilja Avramov discovered documents in Berlin which showed that the targets, for which Tito asked to be bombed, included purely civilian objects, like hospitals, schools, faculties and graveyards. Some of the targets were in very small settlements. Request for bombing of Nikšić, for example, originally came from Peko Dapčević, on 30 March 1944. On 19 April, Dapčević and Mitar Bakić also asked Tito for the bombing of towns of Sjenica, Bijelo Polje and Podgorica.

The chain of command behind the requests for bombings is unclear. The campaign was constantly prolonged, even though the results showed that German troops were almost unharmed, while the civilian fatalities numbered in thousands. On 5 February 1944, Tito sent a dispatch to his representatives in Serbia, which was discovered and made public over 50 years later. In it, Tito notifies them that he is sending British major John Henniker-Major on a special mission, and then instructs them that all wishes concerning the "help of the Allied airforce" will be sent to the Allied mission at the Partisan General Staff, but that the "General Staff will decide if the suggested target will be bombed".

As a proof that the highest Communist leadership was aware of the minimal military benefit of the bombings, but also of the enormous civilian casualties, a letter from Tito's aide, Slovene Edvard Kardelj is often cited. He writes to the Central Committee of Slovenia, concerning the request from the General Staff of Slovenia for Ljubljana to be bombed: I don't understand what prompts you to this and who would have benefits from it. There is no doubt that there will be thousands of our dead people in Ljubljana, but the enemy wouldn't suffer almost any casualties. We have such experience from all over Yugoslavia.

== See also ==
- Air warfare in Yugoslavia (1941–45)
- Allied bombing of Belgrade in World War II
- Bombing of Podgorica in World War II
- Bombing of Zadar in World War II
- Bombing of Zagreb in World War II
- Bombing of Sarajevo in World War II
- Bombing of Leskovac in World War II
- Bombing of Split in World War II
- Bombing of Slavonski Brod in World War II
