= Air warfare in Yugoslavia (1941–1945) =

Air warfare during World War II in Yugoslavia pitted the Yugoslav Air Force, both Royal and NOVJ, United States Army Air Force (USAAF), the Royal Air Force (RAF), including the Balkan Air Force, and Soviet Air Forces against the German Luftwaffe, the Italian Regia Aeronautica and the Air Force of the Independent State of Croatia (Zrakoplovstvo Nezavisne Države Hrvatske, ZNDH). The latter provided the majority of the support for the ground operations against the Partisans. The Allied forces engaged in an extensive bombing campaign in an effort to weaken the Axis hold on the country.

== Operations ==
=== Invasion of Yugoslavia ===
Royal Yugoslav Air Force in April 1941 consisted of Operational Air Force (Serbo-Croatian: Operativno vazduhoplovstvo), Army Air Force for close support of land-based Army, and Naval Air Force, in early stage of organization. Operational Air Force consisted of 4 fighter, and 4 bomber brigades, one independent bomber group of two squadrons, one independent reconnaissance group of two squadrons, and one independent fighter squadron. In total it numbered 300 airplanes of different types (61 Bf 109 E, 8 IK-2, 6 IK-3, 25 Hawker Hurricane, 30 Hawker Fury, 60 Dornier Do 17, 40 Savoia-Marchetti SM.79, 58 Bristol Blenheim). Army Air Force was equipped with 150 outdated reconnaissance airplanes Breguet 19 and Potez 25. Naval Air Force units were equipped with 150 seaplanes.

Operational Air Force suffered heavy losses during the invasion of Yugoslavia. 49 planes were shot down by enemy, 42 were damaged, 85 were destroyed on the ground by enemy, 75 were destroyed on the ground by Yugoslav personnel in order to avoid enemy seizure, 21 broken or damaged on takeoff or landing, 6 were shot down by friendly fire, and only 23 machines continued the fighting: 11 flew to Soviet Union, and 12 to Greece.

=== 1942 ===
The ZNDH flew many missions in support of Army troops in limited scale operations against the Partisans mostly over eastern and western Bosnia, as well as over Croatia using biplane Breguet 19 and Potez 25 aircraft. By September 1941, the ZNDH introduced larger aircraft for bombing Partisan forces and territory. Visual reconnaissance missions using hand-held cameras were also flown. Aerial reconnaissance supplied the Croatian Army with vital data about Partisan movements and positions and about the situation in Partisan territory in general. This was all the more important because the Croatian Army desperately lacked radio equipment of all kinds. Light aircraft were frequently used for liaison duties, particularly connecting the surrounding NDH garrisons and higher command. Often the Army requested one or two aircraft to be temporarily attached to particular Army units to closely co-operate with ground troops.

In 1942 the ZNDH participated in a large German offensive against the Partisan forces in eastern Bosnia. Initially, the Regia Aeronautica also participated in this campaign, but after a tragic incident where an Italian bomber mistakenly attacked German positions near Vlasenica, the German command assigned the ZNDH the responsibility for providing the entire aerial support mission for formations on the ground. At this time there were no significant Luftwaffe forces based in Yugoslavia.

Aside from constant bombing sorties, Potez 25 and Breguet 19 aircraft were also used for daily supply missions to the besieged Croatian Army garrison at Rogatica. They would land under fire at a small improvised grass landing strip, unloading ammunition and other supplies while keeping their engines running and taking off as soon as was possible. Most of the missions were performed by the 2nd and 3rd Group's squadrons based at Sarajevo, which was the strongest operational base at that time. The Zagreb air base was principally employed in attacking Partisan positions in western Slavonia and Bosnia. Not only did this medium bomber force fly reconnaissance and bombing missions against Partisan forces, but also flew deep into territory under Partisan control and attacked railway stations, road traffic, agricultural depots and food stocks.

The Yugoslav Partisan forces were aware of the threat to their operations that the ZNDH provided and were constantly trying to improve their anti-aircraft defence, which relied mainly on machine guns.

December 1942 also saw the return of the Croatian Air Force Legion (HZL) bomber squadron to Croatia from service on the Eastern Front. Upon its return the Legion's bomber squadron was redesignated 1./(Kroat.)KG after having flown its 9 Dornier Do 17Z bombers from Russia back to Croatia. The Dorniers proved a welcome addition to the strike power of the Axis forces fighting the Yugoslav Partisans right up to the end of 1944.

=== 1943 ===
On 20 January 1943, the German HQ in Yugoslavia launched an offensive codenamed "Fall Weiss" (Case White), intending to regain the lost territory. The attack was supported by aircraft from the Luftwaffe, Regia Aeronautica and the ZNDH. Aircraft from the 2nd and 3rd Groups from Sarajevo and the 6th Group from Banja Luka were involved in bombing raids as well as leaflet dropping missions.

By mid-1943, following the capture of southern Italy, Allied aircraft started to appear over the Balkans. NDH military command was aware of this danger and was trying to persuade the Germans to provide at least two squadrons of Messerschmitt Bf 109 fighters to the ZNDH. However, instead of Messerschmitts, the only reinforcement fighters that came from Germany were the first of a batch of 36 overhauled captured French Morane-Saulnier M.S.406 fighters in October, plus another dozen which arrived in December. The Germans also supplied 25 Beneš-Mráz Beta-Minor sporting two seater monoplanes, which were dispatched between the squadrons for liaison duty, as the lack of radio communications equipment at squadron level was still evident.

Attacks on Yugoslav Partisan forces continued however, and on 3 October 1943 seven ZNDH Dornier Do 17Zs caught 2. bataljon of Brigada Braća Radić (2nd battalion of the Radić Brothers Brigade) on the move at Šemovac, on the Varaždin-Ludbreg road. In over one hour's concentrated aerial bombardment, the battalion sustained some sixty casualties, including 42 dead.

=== 1944/1945 ===
Allied aircraft specifically started targeting ZNDH and Luftwaffe bases and aircraft for the first time as a result of the Seventh anti-Partisan Offensive, including Operation Rösselsprung in late May 1944. Up until then Axis aircraft could fly inland almost at will as long as they remained at low altitude. Yugoslav Partisan units on the ground frequently complained about enemy aircraft attacking them while hundreds of Allied aircraft flew above at higher altitude. This changed during Rösselsprung as Allied fighter-bombers went low en-masse for the first time, establishing full aerial superiority. Consequently, both the ZNDH and Luftwaffe were forced to limit their operations in clear weather to early morning and late afternoon hours.

==== Balkan Air Force ====
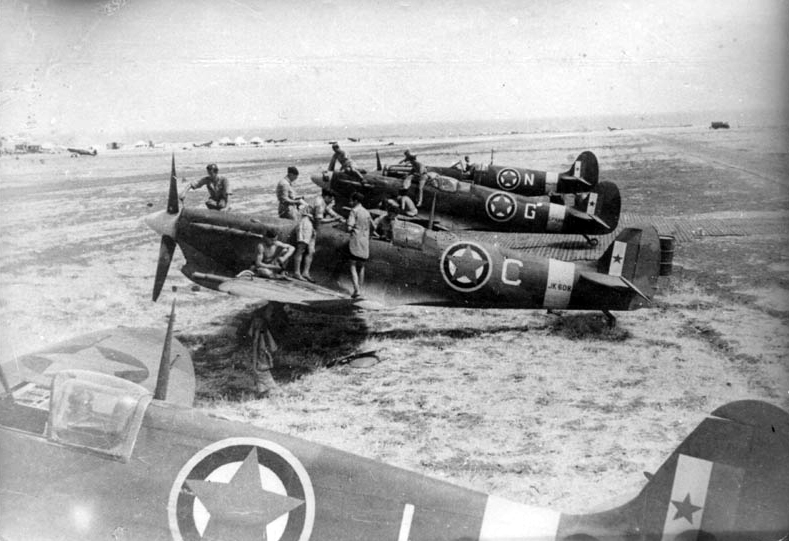
Spitfires of No. 352 (Jugoslav) Squadron RAF (as it was known), before the unit's first mission on 18 August 1944. The squadron was based in Canne, Apulia, Italy. (Source: Yugoslav Aeronautical Museum.)

The Allied Balkan Air Force (BAF) was based at Bari in Italy, and activated on 7 June 1944 to take command of operations in the area separately from the Italian campaign. It mainly supported the operations of the Partisans, led by Josip Broz Tito, against German and Independent State of Croatia (NDH) forces in Yugoslavia. It transported supplies to the partisans, evacuated wounded, dropped agents to help them, and provided air support in their operations against German and NDH troops. In this it was decisive in enabling the Partisans to withstand the Raid on Drvar (Seventh Offensive).

The Allies had begun limited air operations in the Balkans in late 1943 to protect its flank. Aircraft flew anti-shipping missions against the Adriatic coast. This was followed by attacks on strategic facilities.

The Balkan Air Force was a multinational unit, with 15 types of aircraft and men from eight nations: Greece, Co-belligerent Italy, Poland, South Africa, Yugoslavia (two squadrons of fighters), the UK, USA and USSR (a transport squadron). Between its inception and May 1945 the BAF flew 38,340 sorties, dropped 6,650 tons of bombs, delivered 16,440 tons of supplies and flew 2,500 individuals into Yugoslavia and 19,000 (mostly wounded) out.

The Dornier Do 17 medium bombers of the ZNDH were still hitting back when and where they could and on 31 December 1944 a Dornier Do 17E attacked an RAF 148 Squadron Handley Page Halifax bomber on the ground at the Partisan airfield at Grabovnica near Čazma, destroying it with bombs. On 10 February 1945, a single ZNDH Dornier Do 17Z caught 1. Zagorska Brigada (1st Zagorje Brigade) marching in the open near Daruvar. The Yugoslav Partisan unit suffered some two dozen casualties. On 15 April 1945, a force made up of a Dornier Do 17Z, escorted by two Messerschmitt 109Gs destroyed two aircraft of the Yugoslav Partisans at their airfield at Sanski Most.

Towards the end of its existence, the BAF operated a small number of units from Yugoslav soil to harass the retreating Germans. However, disagreements with Tito (particularly the arrest of members of the Special Boat Squadron on 13 April 1945, although they were quickly released) meant that all British ground forces were withdrawn, although BAF aircraft operating from Zadar continued to support the Partisan offensive. Between 19 March and 3 May they flew 2,727 sorties, attacking the German withdrawal route from Sarajevo to Zagreb and supporting the Fourth Yugoslav Army advancing from Bihać to Fiume (Rijeka).

On 16 May 1945 351 and 352 Squadron RAF were administratively transferred to Yugoslav Air Force.

== See also ==
- Royal Yugoslav Air Force
- Croatian Air Force Legion
- Yugoslav Air Force

== Sources ==
- Ciglic, B. and Savic, D., Dornier Do 17 The Yugoslav story, Operational Record 1937-1947. Jeroplan, Belgrade, 2007. ISBN 978-86-909727-0-8
- Dimitrijević, Bojan (2012). Jugoslovensko ratno vazduhoplovstvo. Beograd: Institut za savremenu istoriju. ISBN 978-8674031636.
- Frka, D., "Croatian Air Force in World War II", in Scale Models International, May and June 1993, Argus, London
- Kovačević, Miloš, ed. (1965). Vazduhoplovstvo u narodnooslobodilačkom ratu Jugoslavije (PDF). Zemun: Komanda Ratnog vazduhoplovstva.
- Lazarević, Božo (1972). VAZDUHOPLOVSTVO U NOR-u 1941-1945. Beograd: Vojnoizdavački zavod.
- Likso, T. and Canak, D., Hrvatsko Ratno Zrakoplovstvo u Drugome Svejetskom Ratu (The Croatian Airforce in the Second World War). Zagreb, 1998. ISBN 953-97698-0-9
- Neulen, H.W., In the Skies of Europe – Air Forces allied to the Luftwaffe 1939-1945. Crowood Press, Wiltshire, 2000. ISBN 1-86126-326-0
- Savic, D. and Ciglic, B. Croatian Aces of World War II, Osprey Aircraft of the Aces - 49, Oxford, 2002. ISBN 1-84176-435-3.
- Shaw, L., Trial by Slander: A background to the Independent State of Croatia, Harp Books, Canberra, 1973. ISBN 0-909432-00-7
- The Oxford Companion to World War II
- Terzić, Velimir (1982). SLOM KRALJEVINE JUGOSLAVIJE; uzroci i posledice poraza - book 2. Beograd - Ljubljana - Podgorica: Narodna Knjiga - Partizanska knjiga - Pobjeda.
- Thomas, N., Mikulan, K. and Pavelic, D. Axis Forces in Yugoslavia 1941-45 Osprey, London, 1995. ISBN 1-85532-473-3
- Thomas, N., Abbot, P. and Chappell, M. Partisan Warfare 1941-45 Osprey, London, 2000. ISBN 0-85045-513-8
- Tomasevich, J. War and Revolution in Yugoslavia 1941-1945: Occupation and Collaboration Stanford, Cal., Stanford University Press, 2001. ISBN 0-8047-3615-4
