= United States during the Turkish War of Independence =

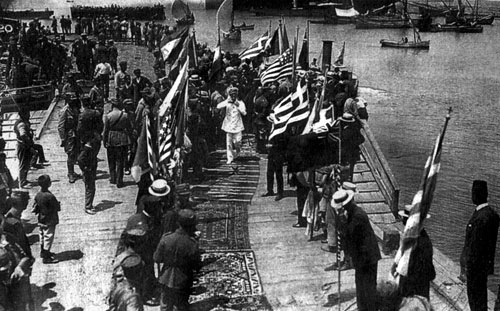
A ceremony in Bandırma displaying Greek and American flags (July 1920)

During World War I, the Ottoman Empire and the United States fought from opposite sides, but they never officially declared war on each other. However, American ships carried weapons for the Triple Entente during the Gallipoli campaign.

The Ottoman Empire and its allies were eventually defeated in late 1918 and the Armistice of Mudros was signed. The Entente requested that Istanbul, the Marmara Region and Greater Armenia be under the control of an American mandate. Some Turkish communities even defended the idea of the whole of Anatolia being controlled by the United States.

The United States reportedly helped the Entente during the Turkish War of Independence; American aid included but wasn't limited to logistical support. The United States helped with the Occupation of Constantinople. USS Arizona and 3 other American warships provided protection to the Greeks during the Greek landing at Smyrna. On 7 June 1922, Greek warships (including the cruiser Georgios Averof) and the American destroyers USS Sands, USS McFarland, and USS Sturtevant were present for the bombardment of the port city of Samsun to help the Pontic Greek rebels in the region. Four civilians were killed and 3 others were injured in the bombardment, and the assault also caused large scale damage in the city, destroying dozens of buildings.

== List of warships ==
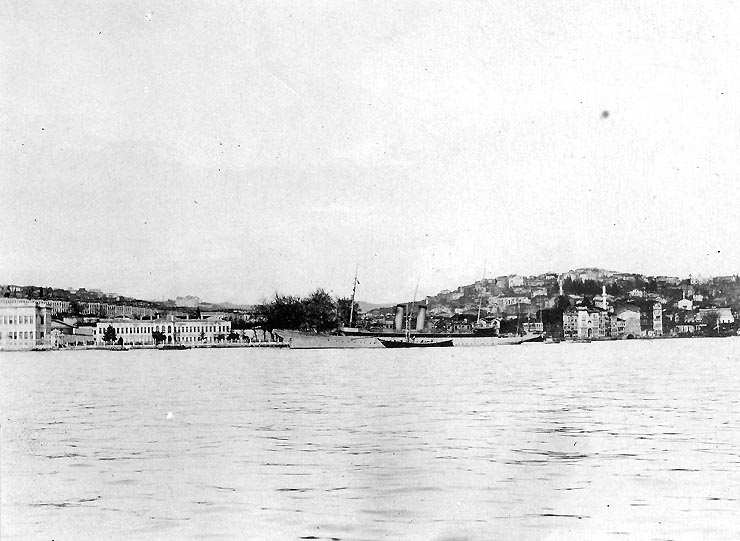
USS Noma in front of Dolmabahçe

Many American warships served in Turkish territorial waters between 1908 and 1923. The most important ones can be listed as;

- USS Scorpion (PY-3)
- USS Alden (DD-211)
- USS Arizona (BB-39)
- USS Noma (SP-131)
- USS Martha Washington (ID-3019)
- USS Dyer (DD-84)
- USS Du Pont (DD-152)
- USS Whipple (DD-217)
- USS Roper (DD-147)
- USS Gregory (DD-82)
- USS Luce (DD-99)
- USS Manley (DD-74)
- USS Tattnall (DD-125)
- USS Humphreys (DD-236)
- USS Sands (DD-243)
- USS Sturtevant (DD-240)
- USS Fox (DD-234)
- USS McFarland (DD-237)
- USS Kane (DD-235)
- USS Hatfield (DD-231)
- USS Gilmer (DD-233)
- USS Hopkins (DD-249)
- USS Overton (DD-239)
- USS King (DD-242)
- USS Barry (DD-248)
- USS Goff (DD-247)
- USS Bainbridge (DD-246)
- USS Bridge (AF-1)
