= Gulf of Sidra incident =

Gulf of Sidra incident or Gulf of Sidra incidents may refer to:

- Gulf of Sidra incident (1981), US-Libyan air engagement over territorial claim, two Russian-made Libyan jets shot down by F-14 Tomcats from USS Nimitz
- Gulf of Sidra incident (1989), US-Libyan air engagement over territorial claim, two Russian-made Libyan jets shot down by F-14 Tomcats from USS John F. Kennedy

== See also ==
- Action in the Gulf of Sidra (1986), US-Libyan naval engagement
