= Bombing of Sarajevo in World War II =

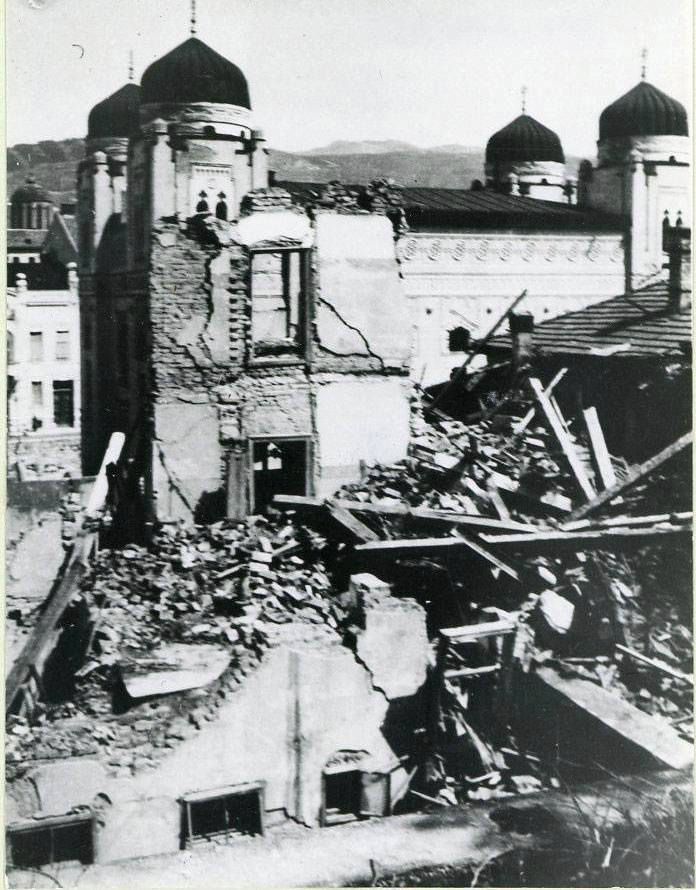
Damaged houses near the synagogue in Sarajevo (April 1941)

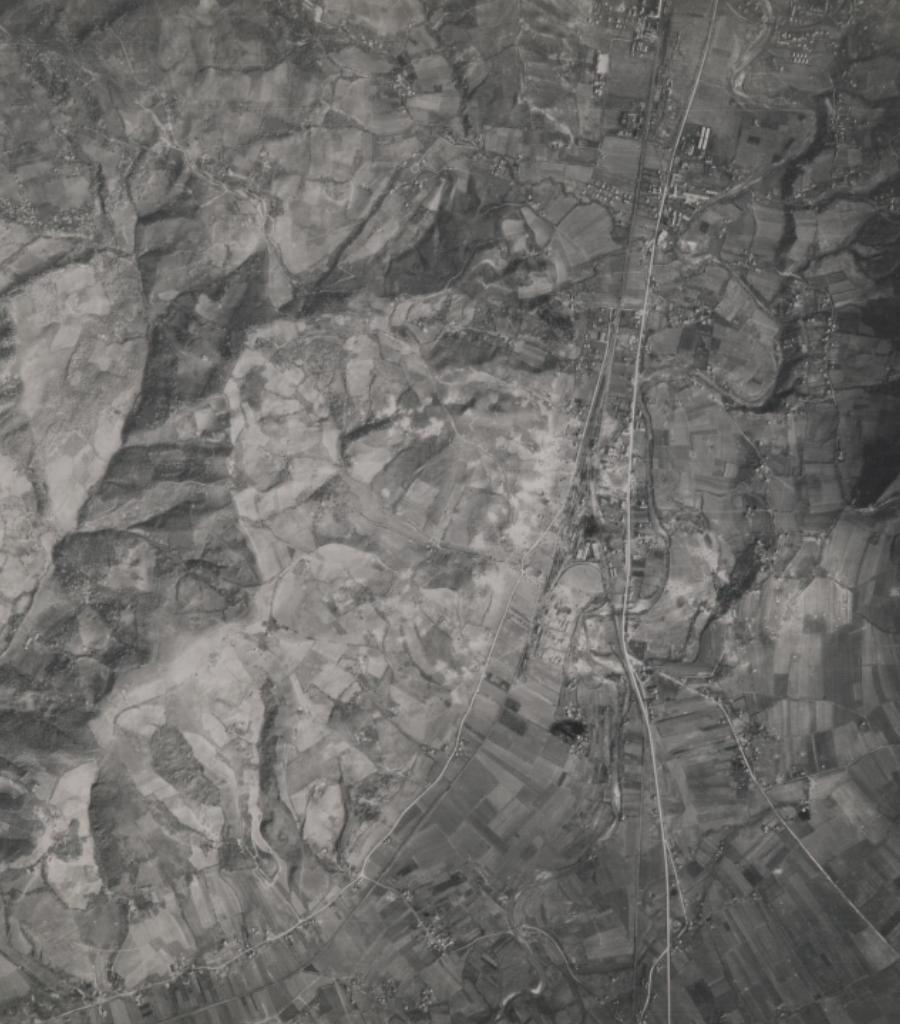
Aerial photo of Sarajevo during an Allied bombing mission (November 1944)

The bombing of Sarajevo in the Second World War occurred first in April 1941 then it was followed by a series of Allied bombings between November 1943 until the end of 1944. Between 1943 and 1944, a total of 1,013 tons of bombs were dropped in Sarajevo. More than 170 American and more than 150 British bombers participated during these missions.

== Timeline ==
- April 6-7, 1941 - First bombing of Sarajevo. Airport damaged. Part of the Axis bombing campaign in Yugoslavia.
- April 12-13, 1941 - Second bombing of Sarajevo. Courthouse, post office and many other locations damaged. 90 lives lost.
- November 14-29, 1943 - First Allied bombing mission in Sarajevo, occurred first on November 14, and then on November 25. Last mission on November 29. Bombing was carried out by 12th American Air Force. 173 lives lost in the first two bombings while 105 people died in the third bombing.
- June 27, 1944 - Two American planes drop five tons of bombs on the airport.
- July 28, 1944 - Military command was bombed.
- September 8, 1944 - 69 bomber planes with a total of 184 tons of bombs attacked two railway hubs.
- November 7, 1944 - Ali-pasha bridge was bombed.
- November 18, 1944 - 10th Allied bombing of Sarajevo.
- November 21, 1944 - 12th Allied bombing of Sarajevo.
- December 3, 1944 - 13th Allied bombing of Sarajevo.
- December 19, 1944 - Last known Allied bombing of Sarajevo. North part of Koševo, Hrasno and Ali-pasha bridge were damaged.
