= Bombing of Zagreb in World War II =

The bombing of Zagreb in World War II was carried out by the Allies from 1944 until 1945. According to a 1950 census of war victims, a total of 327 people were killed by bombing.

Over the course of the bombing, the areas of Črnomerec, Borongaj and Pleso were hit the hardest. Borongaj was targeted as a location of a military airfield.

On February 22, 1944, a Dominican monastery was hit by the bombing, resulting in the deaths of eight theology students. In response to these deaths, archbishop of Zagreb Aloysius Stepinac sent a letter to the British ambassador to the Holy See.

On May 30, 1944, 100 bombs were dropped on Borongaj, each weighing 250 kg.

In 2007 and 2008, unexploded ordnance was found in Maksimir during construction. In 2008 a bomb was found in the nearby town of Sveta Nedelja.

== Timeline ==
- February 22, 1944 – Fifteenth Air Force attacked.
- April 6, 1944 – Fifteenth Air Force attacked, six US aircraft downed.
- May 24, 1944 – Fifteenth Air Force attacked.
- May 30, 1944 – Fifteenth Air Force attacked.
- June 30, 1944 – Fifteenth Air Force attacked.
- July 7, 1944 – Fifteenth Air Force attacked.
- January 5, 1945 – Fifteenth Air Force attacked.
- January 19, 1945 – Fifteenth Air Force attacked.
- February 13, 1945 – Fifteenth Air Force attacked.
- March 4, 1945 – Fifteenth Air Force attacked.
- March 12, 1945 – Twelfth and Fifteenth Air Force attacked.
- March 14, 1945 – Fifteenth Air Force attacked.

== Bibliography ==
- Karakaš Obradov, Marica (2007). "Žrtve saveznickih bombardiranja Nezavisne Države Hrvatske u jugoslavenskim popisma žrtava rata (1947., 1950. i 1964.) i hrvatskim žrtvoslovima (1991.-2005.)" (PDF). Polemos (in Croatian). X (20). Croatian Sociological Association and Naklada Jesenski i Turk: 73–83.
