= Egypt–Libya Campaign =

US contribution to WWII Allied Western Desert Campaign

The Egypt–Libya Campaign is the name used by the United States military for the US contribution to the Allied Western Desert Campaign, during World War II. From 1942, U.S. forces assisted the British Empire in fighting Axis forces in Egypt and Libya. The U.S. Egypt–Libya Campaign was part of what the US military called the Mediterranean Theater of Operations.

== Air Force Operations ==
In June 1942 the United States Army Forces in the Middle East (USAFIME) was created to replace both the North African Mission in Cairo and the Iranian Mission in the Persian Corridor. On June 16 the War Department named Army General Russell L. Maxwell as the first commander of USAFIME. An Army general, rather than an Army Air Corps general, was named because at the time it was still expected that there would be a large U.S. Army land force contribution to the campaign. The next day the War Department informed Maxwell that the Halverson Detachment would remain in Egypt as a part of USAFIME.

In anticipation of the arrival of the American air groups, the War Department sent Maj. Gen. Lewis H Brereton, commander of the U.S. Tenth Air Force in India, to Cairo for temporary duty to assist the Commonwealth forces. He arrived in Cairo on June 25, along with nine B-17 Flying Fortresses.

On June 30, Brereton had directed the B-17s which he had brought from India to move their operations to Palestine. The B-24s of the Halverson Detachment joined them at Lydda, Palestine. Both units flew day and night bombing missions against the Axis' increasingly inadequate supply lines, concentrating their efforts against the port of Tobruk.

The heavy bombers of the Brereton and Halverson detachments (now combined into the 1st Provisional Group under Halverson's command) had been flying with the Commonwealth air forces for some time, and drawing on that experience, the 98th Bombardment Group (Heavy) which arrived in mid-August, was able to go directly into action. The 1st Provisional Group provided the nucleus of the 376th Bomb Group in October, 1942.

When the 12th Bombardment Group (Medium) and the 57th Fighter Group arrived in the theater of operations, they entered a highly cooperative type of air warfare in an unfamiliar desert environment. Initially, they were integrated into comparable RAF formations, allowing them to observe firsthand the complex techniques of air-ground coordination that the Commonwealth forces had developed during their years of fighting in the Western Desert.

To co-ordinate the growing American presence the US Army Middle East Air Force had established the IX Bomber Command and IX Fighter Command.

In November, Lt. Gen. Frank M. Andrews assumed command of USAFIME, replacing Maxwell. Andrews was an experienced airman, and one of his first acts was to establish the Ninth Air Force to replace USAMEAF. Brereton assumed command of the new organization and established the IX Air Service Command, which joined the IX Bomber Command and the IX Fighter Command as the major subordinate headquarters. The 376th Bombardment Group, originally organized to support Soviet forces, became part of the IX Bomber Command and flew its first combat missions over the deserts of North Africa.

The U.S. Army's Egypt–Libya Campaign ended on 12 February 1943, when the Allied forces finally succeeded in driving all Axis forces out of Libya.

In the final analysis, although the U.S. Army provided no ground combat troops to the Egypt-Libya Campaign, the close cooperation between American and British [Commonwealth] staffs set the tone for Anglo-American cooperation for the rest of the war in the Mediterranean and European Theaters of Operations. American leaders had agreed that the Middle East was a British responsibility but that American support was essential for it to remain in Allied hands. Both parties clearly understood and followed through on the necessity to work together to defeat a common foe in a theater critical to Allied worldwide goals.
