= United States military deployments =

Domestic and international deployments of U.S. military personnel

The military of the United States is deployed in most countries around the world, with more than 160,000 of its active-duty personnel stationed outside the United States and its territories. This list consists of deployments excepting active combat deployments.

Outside of active combat, U.S. personnel are typically deployed as part of several peacekeeping and classified missions, military attachés, or are part of embassy and consulate security.

== Rationale ==
=== Statements by U.S. military and government ===
A longstanding justification for maintaining military installations worldwide for the United States is that a military presence abroad by the U.S. promotes and strengthens democracy.

When asked about the reason behind U.S. military presence in Germany, former Supreme Allied Commander Europe Alexander Haig said that "the presence of U.S. troops keeps European markets open to us. If those troops weren't there, those markets would probably be more difficult to access." Adding, "On occasion, even with our presence, we have confronted protectionism in a number of industries, such as automotive and aerospace. In addition to economic benefits derived from our presence in Europe, there is perhaps an even more important diplomatic and political benefit."

=== Statements by others ===
According to Hermann and Kegley, military interventions have boosted democracy in other nations. The majority of academics, however, concur with professor of international politics Abraham Lowenthal that American efforts to spread democracy have been "negligible, often counterproductive, and only occasionally positive."

JoAnn Chirico believes that, as of 2014, the U.S. military presence and installations are often considered responsible for suppressing democracy in countries such as Cameroon, Chad, Ethiopia, Jordan, Kuwait, Niger, Oman, Qatar, Saudi Arabia, and United Arab Emirates.

In her 1979 essay, "Dictatorships and Double Standards", Jeane Kirkpatrick argued that although the United States should encourage democracy, it should be understood that premature reforms may cause a backlash that could give the Communists an opportunity to take over. For this reason, she considered it legitimate to support non-communist dictatorships, adding that a successful and sustainable democratic process is likely to be a long-term process in many cases in the Third World. The essence of the so-called Kirkpatrick Doctrine is the use of selective methods to advance democracy in order to contain the wave of communism.

== Current deployments ==
The following tables detail the approximate numbers of personnel from six branches of the U.S. military which are currently deployed based on the geographic unified combatant commands. These numbers do not include any military or civilian contractors or their dependents. Additionally, countries in which U.S. military are engaged in active combat operations are not included. The numbers are based on the most recent United States Department of Defense statistics as of August 31, 2026.

=== Northern and Southern Commands (Americas) ===
Jurisdiction	Total	Army	Navy	USAF	USMC	USCG	USSF
United States (contiguous)	1,105,298	366,494	297,195	252,281	141,147	38,545	9,636
Alaska	20,963	10,403	38	8,565	13	1,917	27
Puerto Rico	807	114	40	24	10	618	1
Guantanamo Bay	570	119	427	–	19	5	–
Honduras	357	212	2	135	7	1	–
Canada	163	26	39	75	15	5	3
Greenland	142	–	–	120	–	–	22
Mexico	98	17	6	5	67	3	–
other	624	139	145	67	207	63	3
Total	1,129,022	377,524	297,892	261,272	141,485	41,157	9,692

=== Indo-Pacific Command ===
Jurisdiction	Total	Army	Navy	USAF	USMC	USCG	USSF
Japan	56,122	2,748	21,973	12,661	18,580	27	133
Hawaii	48,755	21,444	13,032	5,291	7,200	1,568	220
South Korea	22,574	15,064	379	6,875	171	1	84
Guam	7,466	394	4,030	2,452	201	389	–
Australia	320	50	100	137	25	3	5
Diego Garcia	278	–	278	–	–	–	–
Singapore	268	14	210	25	9	10	–
Thailand	105	33	11	17	44	–	–
other	468	133	61	41	214	19	–
Total	136,356	39,880	40,074	27,499	26,444	2,017	442

=== European Command ===
US military bases in Germany in 2014

Jurisdiction	Total	Army	Navy	USAF	USMC	USCG	USSF
Germany	37,561	23,735	460	12,734	391	9	232
Italy	12,903	4,230	3,705	4,878	65	1	24
United Kingdom	10,317	213	304	9,672	60	13	55
Spain	3,972	26	3,494	416	34	1	1
Turkey	1,637	100	6	1,504	27	–	–
Belgium	1,119	618	86	378	33	–	4
Greece	477	10	436	22	8	–	1
Netherlands	413	113	29	220	14	35	2
Poland	390	255	94	31	10	–	–
Portugal	248	7	51	173	17	–	–
Romania	128	18	91	10	9	–	–
other	697	164	69	181	269	11	3
Total	69,862	29,489	8,825	30,219	937	70	322

=== Central and African commands ===
Jurisdiction	Total	Army	Navy	USAF	USMC	USCG	USSF
Bahrain	2,871	21	2,326	14	203	307	–
Kuwait	432	394	3	25	10	–	–
Saudi Arabia	261	161	20	58	22	–	–
Egypt	159	115	7	18	19	–	–
Qatar	150	50	5	73	7	–	15
United Arab Emirates	125	21	25	32	47	–	–
Israel	96	53	6	12	25	–	–
other	927	241	64	100	521	1	–
Total	5,021	1,056	2,456	332	854	308	15

=== Unspecified ===
Jurisdiction	Total	Army	Navy	USAF	USMC	USCG	USSF
Overseas	11,687	7,448	10	1,258	2,938	–	33

== See also ==
- List of notable deployments of U.S. military forces overseas since 1798
- List of United States overseas military bases
- List of United States military bases
- Marine Security Guard
- Military Assistance Advisory Group
- Military Assistance Command, Vietnam
- United States Taiwan Defense Command
- Status of forces agreement
- United States foreign aid
- United States militarism
