= Donald McHenry =

American diplomat

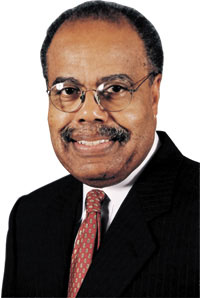

15th United States Ambassador to the United Nations
- In office September 23, 1979 – January 20, 1981
- President: Jimmy Carter
- Preceded by: Andrew Young
- Succeeded by: Jeane Kirkpatrick

Personal details
- Born: October 13, 1936 (age 89) St. Louis, Missouri, U.S.
- Party: Democratic
- Education: Illinois State University (BS); Southern Illinois University, Carbondale (MS); Georgetown University (attended)

Donald Franchot McHenry (born October 13, 1936) is an American former diplomat. He was the United States Ambassador and Permanent Representative to the United Nations from September 1979 until January 20, 1981.

== Biography ==
McHenry was born to parents from East St. Louis, Illinois at a hospital across the river in St. Louis, Missouri, due to the hospitals being segregated in his hometown. He grew up across the river in East St. Louis, Illinois. He attended Illinois State University, graduating with a BS in 1957. He then continued on to earn a master's degree from Southern Illinois University Carbondale in 1959 and began a doctoral program at Georgetown University.

McHenry spent much of his career working in foreign diplomacy. He began working with the United States Department of State in 1963, and spent eight years there. From 1971 to 1976, he worked for a series of private think-tanks - the Brookings Institution, the Council on Foreign Relations, and the Carnegie Endowment for International Peace - writing about foreign policy.

In 1976, McHenry served as a member of President Carter's transition staff at the State Department before joining the U.S. Mission to the United Nations. In March 1977, he was appointed as the U.S. Deputy Representative to the United Nations Security Council.

In August 1979, McHenry was the principal negotiator for the United States when a Soviet airliner carrying Russian ballerina Lyudmila Vlasova was prevented from taking off by Port Authority Police. Acting Secretary of State Warren Christopher had ordered the interception because Vlasova's husband, Alexander Godunov, who had defected two days earlier, had expressed his belief that his wife was returning to the Soviet Union against her will. Vlasova steadily maintained that she was returning voluntarily, but the U.S. representation was unwilling to accept her statement unless they could speak with her in the absence of Soviet officials. This request was denied.

Eventually Soviet officials allowed Vlasova to speak with U.S. representatives in a mobile lounge that was brought up to the plane. She convinced them that she was not returning under coercion, and the plane took off with Vlasova on board.

The timing of the Vlasova incident drew attention to McHenry at a critical time. Earlier that year, Andrew Young had been made to resign his post as U.S. Ambassador to the U.N. after meeting with a representative of the Palestine Liberation Organization, against U.S. policy, and making controversial remarks on political prisoners in the U.S. In September 1979, McHenry was appointed Ambassador and U.S. Permanent Representative to the U.N. by President Jimmy Carter.

In 1986 McHenry received a L.H.D. from Bates College. He has served on the board of directors of several multi-national corporations and is a Fellow of the American Academy of Arts and Sciences. He is currently Professor of Diplomacy and International Affairs at Georgetown University. He has also been a director of The Coca-Cola Company since 1981, as well as a former director of AT&T Corporation and International Paper. McHenry is an Advisory Board member for the Partnership for a Secure America, a not-for-profit organization dedicated to recreating the bipartisan center in American national security and foreign policy.

Donald McHenry is a member of the Global Leadership Foundation, an organization which works to support democratic leadership, prevent and resolve conflict through mediation and promote good governance in the form of democratic institutions, open markets, human rights and the rule of law. It does so by making available, discreetly and in confidence, the experience of former leaders to today’s national leaders. It is a not-for-profit organization composed of former heads of government, senior governmental and international organization officials who work closely with Heads of Government on governance-related issues of concern to them.

In 2004, McHenry was among 27 retired diplomats and military commanders who publicly said the administration of President George W. Bush did not understand the world and was unable to handle "in either style or substance" the responsibilities of global leadership. On June 16, 2004 the Diplomats and Military Commanders for Change issued a statement against the Iraq War.

== Awards and honors ==
- McHenry was inducted as a Laureate of The Lincoln Academy of Illinois and awarded the Order of Lincoln (the State’s highest honor) by the Governor of Illinois on June 19, 2021.

Diplomatic posts
Preceded by Andrew Young	United States Ambassador to the United Nations; 1979–1981	Succeeded by Jeane Kirkpatrick
