= Jean Kirkpatrick =

Jean Kirkpatrick may refer to:

- Jeane Kirkpatrick (1926–2006), American diplomat
- Jean Kirkpatrick (sociologist) (1926–2006), who founded Women For Sobriety
