= U.S. policy towards authoritarianism =

United States foreign policy regarding authoritarian governments

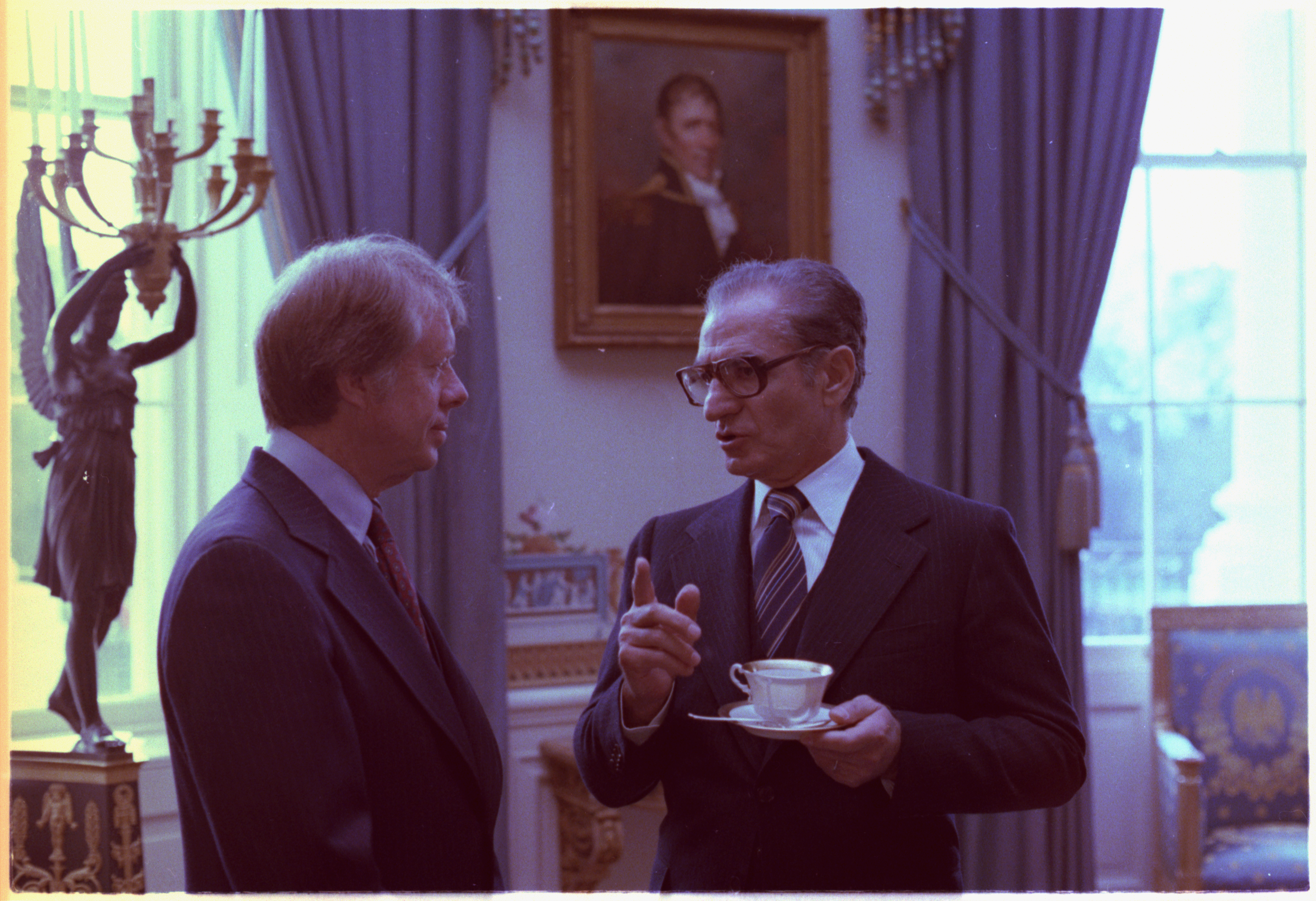
U.S. President Jimmy Carter meeting with Iranian Shah Mohammad Reza Pahlavi at the White House in November 1977

Throughout its history and up to the present day, the United States has had close ties with authoritarian governments. During the Cold War, the U.S. backed anti-communist governments that were authoritarian, and were often unable or unwilling to promote modernization. U.S. officials have been accused of collaborating with oppressive and anti-democratic governments to secure their military bases in Central America, Africa, Asia, and the Middle East. The Economist Democracy Index classifies many of the forty-five currently non-democratic U.S. military base host countries as "authoritarian governments".

During the Cold War, the U.S. provided support for state terrorism and anti-communist mass killings, including Operation Condor in South America and the Indonesian mass killings of 1965–66. In cases like the 1953 Iranian, 1954 Guatemalan, and 1973 Chilean coup d'états, the United States participated in the overthrow of democratically elected governments in favor of dictators who aligned with the United States. The U.S.' claimed justification for support of authoritarian right-wing governments was the resulting stability that would facilitate economic progress and the idea that democratic institutions could be encouraged and built. Some critical scholars and journalists argue that it was intended to reinforce American business interests and to expand capitalism into countries of the Global South who were attempting to pursue alternative paths.

== Background ==
During the Cold War, leaders of developing countries received political and economic benefits, such as financial support and military assistance, in exchange for their alliance with either the United States or the Soviet Union. As a result, some dictators amassed fortunes at the expense of their nations and were able to maintain their rule by building substantial militaries. The Soviet Union and the United States gained access to markets for their manufactured goods, and locations for their military bases and missile stations. According to Chirico, the two superpowers supplied weapons to dictators, which strengthened their armies and helped quell uprisings. According to a 2017 blogpost by anthropologist David Vine, the U.S. often rationalized the siting of its military bases in non-democratic nations as a necessary but undesirable product of defending against the communist threat posed by the Soviet Union. Few of these bases have been abandoned since the end of the Cold War and the collapse of the Soviet Union.

In The Jakarta Method, Vincent Bevins writes that the Cold War violence of the United States, in particular coups and the propping up of pro-capitalist military despots throughout the Global South, has deeply shaped the world we live in today, a "worldwide capitalist order with the United States as its leading military power and center of cultural production." Much of this violence was not directed against governments and movements aligned with the Soviet Union, but the Third World movements which were attempting to build something different, and thereby "destroyed a number of alternative possibilities for world development." He argues that contrary to the popular notion that much of the developing world peacefully and willingly adopted the capitalist system advocated by the United States and its allies, it's possible that without this violence, "many of these countries would not be capitalist at all," or at the very least would have banded together to "insist on changing the rules of global capitalism."

Ruth J Blakeley argues that the U.S. justification given for facilitating state terrorism and coups and installing military dictators, the containment and defeat of Communism, paints a distorted picture as it was also a means by which to buttress the interests of US business elites and to promote the expansion of capitalism and neoliberalism in the Global South.

Mark Aarons posits that right-wing authoritarian regimes and dictatorships backed by Western powers committed atrocities and mass killings that rival the Communist world. According to Latin Americanist John Henry Coatsworth, the number of repression victims in Latin America alone far surpassed that of the U.S.S.R. and its East European satellites between 1960 and 1990.

== Examples ==
The U.S. government provided military, logistical and other aid to the Chinese government led by Chiang Kai-shek's Kuomintang (KMT) in its civil war against the indigenous Chinese Communist Party (CCP) led by Mao Zedong. Both the KMT and the CCP were fighting against invading Japanese forces, until the Japanese surrender to the United States in August 1945. This surrender brought to an end the Japanese Puppet state of Manchukuo and the Japanese-dominated Wang Jingwei regime.

After the Japanese surrender, the US continued to support the KMT against the CCP. The US airlifted many KMT troops from central China to Manchuria. Approximately 50,000 U.S. troops were sent to guard strategic sites in Hubei and Shandong. The U.S. trained and equipped KMT troops, and also transported Korean troops and even former Imperial Japanese Army troops back to help KMT forces fight, and ultimately lose, against the People's Liberation Army. In his memoirs, President Harry Truman justified deploying Japanese troops against the CCP: "It was perfectly clear to us that if we told the Japanese to lay down their arms immediately and march to the seaboard, the entire country would be taken over by the Communists. We therefore had to take the unusual step of using the enemy as a garrison until we could airlift Chinese National troops to South China and send Marines to guard the seaports." Within less than two years after the Second Sino-Japanese War, the KMT had received $4.43 billion from the United States—most of which was military aid.

After World War II, the United States was in opposition to the Soviet Union, which it regarded as totalitarian and expansionist. During the U.S.'s global effort to organize the Western Bloc and oppose communist expansion, the People's Republic of China was also seen as an expansionist, totalitarian dictatorship.

In the Middle East, Asia, Latin America and Africa, the U.S. supported authoritarian governments such as those of the Shah of Iran, Ferdinand Marcos of the Philippines, the Somoza dynasty of Nicaragua, Fulgencio Batista of Cuba, Mobutu Sese Seko of Zaire, and Emperor Haile Selassie of Ethiopia.

American diplomat Henry Kissinger initiated the U.S.'s arms-for-petrodollars program for the autocratic governments of Saudi Arabia and pre-1979 Iran, supported coups and death squads throughout Latin America, and supported Indonesian dictator and close U.S. ally Suharto. Jeane Kirkpatrick, the U.S. ambassador to the United Nations (U.N.) under President Ronald Reagan, was praised for her open support of pro-Western and right-wing oppressors including the Shah of Iran and Nicaragua's military dictator Anastasio Somoza, both of whom "were positively friendly to the U.S., sending their sons and others to be educated in our universities, voting with us in the United Nations, and regularly supporting American interests and positions even when these entailed personal and political cost".

Nigerian political scientist Claude Ake stated that while the U.S. continued to present itself as the leader of the free world in the 1990s, it sold more weapons to developing countries than all other arms traders combined. According to U.S. Representative Cynthia McKinney and Senator John Kerry; "[d]espite rhetorical pledges to promote democracy and constrain the spread of weaponry worldwide, the Clinton administration has continued the Cold War and Bush administration policy of providing substantial amounts of weapons and training to the armed forces of non-democratic governments". (Note: Cynthia McKinney and John Kerry, Foreword: The Arms Transfer Code of Conduct, in Demilitarization for Democracy, Dictators or Democracies?: U.S. Transfers of Weapons and Military Training to the DEVELOPING World During President Clinton's First Term, Third Annual Edition, (Washington D.C., 1997), pp. I-ii.) In a 1997 report, Demilitarization for Democracy (DFD) said while democratic governments received 18 percent ($8 billion), non-democratic governments received 82 percent ($36 billion) of the $44.0 billion in arms and training provided to countries with U.S. Government approval during Bill Clinton's first four years in office. The authors concluded; "[t]he United States is increasingly dependent on the developing nations to keep its high share of the global arms market".

After International Criminal Court issued arrest warrants for Israeli Prime Minister Benjamin Netanyahu and his former defense minister, Yoav Gallant, over suspected war crimes in Gaza, American politicians have threatened to impose sanctions on officials at the ICC.

=== Table of authoritarian governments supported by the United States ===
Country	Regime or leader	Time period	See also or notes	Ref
Argentina	National Reorganization Process	1976–1978, 1981–1982	Argentina–United States relations	
Azerbaijan	Various	1991–present	United States–Azerbaijan relations	
Uruguay	Civic-military dictatorship of Uruguay	1973–1985	Operation Condor, Dan Mitrione	
Brazil	Getúlio Vargas	1937–1945	Brazil–United States relations	
Brazil	Military dictatorship in Brazil	1964–1985	Brazil–United States relations	
Bolivia	René Barrientos	1964–1969	Bolivia–United States relations	
Bolivia	Hugo Banzer	1971–1978	Bolivia–United States relations	
Chile	Military dictatorship of Chile	1973–1976	Chile–United States relations	
Nicaragua	Somoza dictatorship	1961–1977	Nicaragua–United States relations	
Greece	Greek Junta	1967–1974	Greece–United States relations	
Pakistan	Mohammed Ayub Khan	1958–1969	Pakistan–United States relations The authoritarian regime of Ayub Khan was backed by the United States as a bulwark against the influence of the Soviet Union in South Asia. Henry Kissinger, a powerful US diplomat, was wary of the left-wing sympathies of the Indian government, and exploited the historic tension between Pakistan and India for American interests.	
Pakistan	Yahya Khan	1969–1971		
Pakistan	Zia-ul-Haq	1978–1988		
Cambodia	Lon Nol Pol Pot	1970–1975	Cambodia–United States relations Allegations of United States support for the Khmer Rouge	
China	Deng Xiaoping	1980–1989	China–United States relations. In 1980 the US government opened listening posts in Xinjiang to monitor the Soviet Union during the Soviet–Afghan War. After the 1989 Tiananmen square massacre, the US imposed an arms embargo on China.	
Cuba	Gerardo Machado	1925–1933	Dictator supported by the United States until his removal with the involvement of Franklin D. Roosevelt.	
Cuba	Fulgencio Batista	1952–1958	Cuba–United States relations. The US government has been accused of supporting Batista's 1952 coup to become president again and his subsequent government to remain in control Cuba. The US has rejected these arguments.	
Cameroon	Ahmadou Ahidjo, Paul Biya	1966–present	Cameroon–United States relations	
Uganda	Yoweri Museveni	1986–present	Uganda–United States relations	
Dominican Republic	Rafael Trujillo	1930–1960	The United States supported Trujillo's dictatorship until facilitating a coup that overthrew his regime in 1961.	
Laos	Phoui Sananikone, Phoumi Nosavan,Souvanna Phouma	1954–1975	United States–Laos relations	
Iran	Mohammad Reza Pahlavi	1953–1979	1953 Iranian coup d'état	
Iran	Ruhollah Khomeini	1981–1986	The United States gave arms to Iran in secrecy during the Iran-Contra affair. This was done to contain both sides economically and militarily.	
Iraq	Abdul Salam Arif, Abdul Rahman Arif	1963–1967	Iraq–United States relations	
Iraq	Saddam Hussein	1982–1988	Iraq–United States relations and United States support for Iraq during the Iran–Iraq War. The U.S. military provided aid and support to Saddam Hussein's troops at the request of the then U.S. government. The US later fought Saddam Hussein's Iraq in the 1990 Gulf War and ousted him in the 2003 Iraq War.	
Ethiopia	Haile Selassie	1953–1976	Ethiopian–United States relations	
Ethiopia	Various	1991–present	Ethiopian–United States relations	
Oman	Qaboos bin Said and Haitham bin Tariq	1970–present	Oman–United States relations.	
Thailand	Phibun Songkhram, Sarit Thanarat, Thanom Kittikachorn, Praphas Charusathien	1948–1973		
Libya	King Idris I	1951–1969	Libya-United States relations	
Libya	Muammar Gaddafi	2002–2011	Despite maintaining general hostility with Gaddafi following his 1969 coup, following the 9/11 attacks the two nations improved relations, with the US extraditing terrorism suspects to Libya, lifting sanctions on the country, and removing the country from the United States list of terrorism sponsors. Libya dismantled their WMDs program. This relation would fall apart with the NATO intervention in the Libyan civil war.	
Rwanda	Paul Kagame	2000–present	Rwanda–United Stares relations	
Kazakhstan	Various	1991–present		
Philippines	Ferdinand Marcos	1973–1986	Philippines–United States relations.	
Philippines	Rodrigo Duterte	2016–2022	Philippines–United States relations and United States bases in the Philippines	
South Korea	Syngman Rhee, Park Chung-hee and Chun Doo-hwan	1950–1988	South Korea–United States relations and Truth and Reconciliation Commission (South Korea)	
South Korea	Yoon Suk Yeol	2022–2024	South Korea–United States relations	
South Vietnam	Ngô Đình Diệm	1955–1963	The U.S. government supported President Ngo Dinh Diem throughout his time in power until Diem was assassinated in a US-backed coup.	
Soviet Union	Joseph Stalin	1941–1945	The Soviet Union and USA formed an alliance during World War II to combat Nazi Germany. The end of the war led to the Cold War between the two superpowers.	
Yemen	Ali Abdullah Saleh	1990–2012	United States–Yemen relations.	
Equatorial Guinea	Teodoro Obiang Nguema Mbasogo	1979–present	Equatorial Guinea–United States relations	
Gabon	Omar Bongo, Ali Bongo, and Brice Oligui Nguema	1967–present	Gabon–United States relations	
Egypt	Gamal Abdel Nasser	1952–1956	Egypt–United States relations	
Egypt	Hosni Mubarak	1989–2011	Egypt–United States relations	
Egypt	Abdel Fattah el-Sisi	2014–present	Egypt–United States relations	
Turkey	Kenan Evren and Recep Tayyip Erdoğan	1952–present	Turkey–United States relations and Turkey in NATO	
Saudi Arabia	House of Saud	1945–present	Saudi Arabia–United States relations	
Qatar	House of Thani	1971–present	Qatar–United States relations	
Bahrain	House of Khalifa	1971–present	Bahrain–United States relations	
United Arab Emirates	Royal families of the United Arab Emirates	1971–present	United Arab Emirates–United States relations	
Indonesia	Suharto	1967–1998	Indonesia–United States relations Indonesian mass killings of 1965–66	
Taiwan	Dang Guo regime	1937–1987	Taiwan–United States relations and White Terror (Taiwan)	
El Salvador	Military dictatorship in El Salvador	1931–1979	El Salvador–United States relations and Salvadoran Civil War	
Paraguay	Dictatorship of Alfredo Stroessner	1954–1989	Archives of Terror	
Guatemala	Manuel Estrada Cabrera	1898–1920		
Guatemala	Jorge Ubico	1931–1944		
Guatemala	Military governments	1954–1996	1954 Guatemalan coup d'état and Guatemalan Civil War	
Haiti	Duvalier dynasty	1957–1986	Haiti–United States relations and Haitian National Truth and Justice Commission	
Jordan	House of Hashim	1994–present	Jordan–United States relations	
Senegal	Léopold Sédar Senghor	1960–1980	Senegal–United States relations	
Kingdom of Yugoslavia	King Peter II	1941–1943	United States–Yugoslavia relations	
Yugoslavia	Josip Broz Tito	1948–1980	United States–Yugoslavia relations	
Zaire	Mobutu Sese Seko	1965–1997	CIA activities in the Democratic Republic of the Congo	
Democratic Republic of the Congo	Laurent Kabila, Joseph Kabila, Félix Tshisekedi	1997–present		
Venezuela	Juan Vicente Gómez	1908–1935	United States–Venezuelan relations	
Venezuela	Marcos Pérez Jiménez	1948–1958	United States–Venezuelan relations	
Venezuela	Delcy Rodríguez	2026–present	Following the abduction of Nicolas Maduro, Rodríguez has maintained economic collaboration and sharing of intelligence with Donald Trump's administration.	
Honduras	Tiburcio Carías Andino	1933–1949	Honduras–United States relations	
Honduras	Various	1963–1982	Honduras–United States relations	
Sudan	Gaafar Nimeiry	1976–1985	Sudan–United States relations	
Chad	Hissène Habré, Idriss Déby, Mahamat Déby	1982–present	CIA activities in Chad	
El Salvador	Nayib Bukele	2024–present	El Salvador–United States relations and foreign prisoners at the Terrorism Confinement Center	
Spain	Francisco Franco	1953–1975	Pact of Madrid	
Portugal	António de Oliveira Salazar	1949–1974	Estado Novo and North Atlantic Treaty	
Panama	Omar Torrijos	1968–1981	United States–Panama relations	
Panama	Manuel Noriega	1983–1988	Noriega, a military officer with connections to the Central Intelligence Agency, and maintained a cooperative relationship between the US and Panama from 1983 to 1988. The relationship deteriorated in the late 1980s, and resulted in the United States forcibly removing him from power in the United States invasion of Panama in 1989.	
Peru	Manuel Odría	1948–1956	United States–Peru relations	
Peru	Alberto Fujimori	1992–2000	United States–Peru relations	
South Africa	Apartheid	1948–1994	South Africa–United States relations and History of South Africa (1948–1994)	
India	Narendra Modi	2014–present	India–United States relations	
Singapore	Various	1965–present		
Turkmenistan	Various	1991–present		
Tunisia	Zine El Abidine Ben Ali	1987–2011		
Vietnam	Various	1994–present	United States–Vietnam relations	
Somalia	Siad Barre	1978–1990	Somalia–United States relations	
Syria	Husni al-Za'im	1949	Syria–United States relations	
Syria	Bashar al-Assad	2001–2005	The Syrian government provided the US government with intel on al-Qaeda following the 9/11 attacks. The US transferred several terrorism suspects to Syria, where they were tortured.	
Kyrgyzstan	Various	1991–present	Kyrgyzstan–United States relations	
Uzbekistan	Various	1992–present	Uzbekistan–United States relations	
Romania	Nicolae Ceaușescu	1969–1989	Romania–United States relations	
Liberia	Samuel Doe	1980–1989	Liberia–United States relations	
Tajikistan	Various	1997–present	Tajikistan–United States relations	
Morocco	Various	1956–present	Morocco–United States relations	
Djibouti	Ismaïl Omar Guelleh	1999–present	Djibouti–United States relations	
Brunei	Hassanal Bolkiah	1984–present	Brunei–United States relations	
Mexico	Porfirio Díaz	1876–1911	Mexico–United States relations	
Mexico	Institutional Revolutionary Party	1929–2000	Mexico–United States relations	

== Rationale ==
According to Los Angeles Times, American authorities believe assisting authoritarian or "friendly" governments benefits the U.S. and other nations. According to Glenn Greenwald, the strategic justification for American support of dictatorships has remained constant even before and since World War II:

In a world where anti-American sentiment is prevalent, democracy often produces leaders who impede rather than serve U.S. interests ... None of this is remotely controversial or even debatable. U.S. support for tyrants has largely been conducted out in the open, and has been expressly defended and affirmed for decades by the most mainstream and influential U.S. policy experts and media outlets.

In her essay "Dictatorships and Double Standards", Kirkpatrick says although the U.S. should encourage democracy, it should be understood premature reforms may cause a backlash that could give communists an opportunity to take over. For this reason, she considered it legitimate to support non-communist dictatorships, saying a successful, sustainable democratic process is likely to be a long-term process in many cases in the Third World. The essence of the Kirkpatrick Doctrine is the use of selective methods to advance democracy and contain the wave of communism.

David Vine believe locating military bases in repressive nations is critical to deterring "bad actors" and advancing U.S. interests. According to Andrew Yeo, foreign bases contribute to the general good by ensuring security or financial stability, and support local economies by creating jobs. Bradley Bowman, a former professor at the United States Military Academy, said these facilities and the forces stationed there serve as a "major catalyst for anti-Americanism and radicalization". Other studies have found a link between the presence of the U.S. bases and al-Qaeda recruitment. Opponents of repressive governments often cite these bases to provoke anger, protest, and nationalistic fervor against the ruling class and the U.S. This, according to JoAnn Chirico, raises concerns in Washington a democratic transition could lead to the closure of bases, which often encourages the U.S. to extend its support for authoritarian leaders. This study says the outcome could be an intensifying cycle of protest and repression supported by the U.S., according to David Vine.

Dwight D. Eisenhower discussed the "campaign of hatred against us" in the Arab world "not by the governments but by the people". The Wall Street Journal reached a similar conclusion after surveying the views of wealthy and Western Muslims after September 11 attacks. The head of the Council of Foreign Relations terrorism program said that American support for repressive regimes such as Egypt and Saudi Arabia is a major factor in anti-American sentiment in the Arab world.

According to Afoaku, the Cold War provided much justification for U.S. arms transfers to developing countries in the 1970s and 1980s. Proponents of the traditional paradigm assumed a rapid decline in U.S. arms and training transfers to these countries after the collapse of the Soviet Union. U.S. arms transfers have doubled to an average of $15 billion per year, 85 percent of which has gone to non-democratic governments since 1990. This doubling of arms transfers, in the absence of a compelling strategic rationale, was the result of determined, costly lobbying by arms manufacturers, who wanted to replace their small U.S. military orders with foreign orders. The Aerospace Industries Association (AIA), a Washington, D.C.-based association representing more than 50 major manufacturers, coordinated the lobbying and successfully pressured President Bush to approve the sale of F-15E fighter jets to Saudi Arabia. As a result of Israel's agreement to the contract, it also received the F-14E. AIA companies have succeeded in subverting U.S. policy of linking arms sales to human-rights improvements.

According to an April 2025 survey, known as Bright Line Watch, of more than 500 U.S.-based political scientists shows that the vast majority think the United States is moving from liberal democracy to a form of authoritarianism.

== See also ==
- Criticism of United States foreign policy
- Dan Mitrione
- Operation Condor
- United States and state-sponsored terrorism
- United States atrocity crimes
- United States involvement in regime change
- Democratic backsliding in the United States
- Sphere of influence

== Bibliography ==
- Afoaku, Osita G. (2000). "U.S. Foreign Policy and Authoritarian Regimes: Change and Continuity in International Clientelism". Journal of Third World Studies. 17 (2). University Press of Florida: 13–40. JSTOR 45198191.
- Bevins, Vincent (2020). The Jakarta Method: Washington's Anticommunist Crusade and the Mass Murder Program that Shaped Our World. PublicAffairs. ISBN 978-1541742406.
- Blakeley, Ruth (2009). State Terrorism and Neoliberalism: The North in the South. Routledge. ISBN 978-0415686174.
- Greenwald, Glenn (May 2, 2017). "Trump's Support and Praise of Despots Is Central to the U.S. Tradition, Not a Deviation From It". The Intercept.
- Chirico, JoAnn (2014). Globalization: Prospects and Problems. SAGE Publication Ltd. p. 71. ISBN 9781483315447.
- Vine, David (May 16, 2017). "How U.S. Military Bases Back Dictators, Autocrats, And Military Regimes". HuffPost.
- Wright, Steven (2007). The United States and Persian Gulf Security. Ithaca Press. ISBN 978-0-86372-321-6.
- Chomsky, Noam (2001). 9-11: Was There an Alternative?. The Open Media. ISBN 9781609803438.
- Chomsky, Noam (2003). Hegemony or Survival: America's Quest for Global Dominance. Henry Holt and Company, LLC. ISBN 0-8050-7400-7.
