= List of deployments of the United States military forces overseas =

The Congressional Research Service (CRS) of the United States Congress provides a list of "notable deployments of the United States military forces overseas" from 1798 through April 2023. The CRS report is updated approximately annually.

The report explains, "The instances vary greatly in size of operation, [duration,] legal authorization, and significance. ... [I]nclusion in this list does not connote either the legality or the level of significance of the instance described. ... Because of differing judgments ..., other lists may include more or fewer instances." Footnote 1 of the report cites three sources of alternative lists, as well as a source for a discussion of the evolution of such lists. The data in this article are from version 41, published on June 7, 2023.

- 481 "instances in which the United States has used military forces abroad in situations of military conflict or potential conflict to protect U.S. citizens or promote U.S. interests."
- It does not include "covert actions or the many occurrences in which U.S. forces have been stationed abroad since World War II in occupation forces or for participation in mutual security organizations, base agreements, or routine military assistance or training operations."
- Of the 226 years from 1798 through 2023, deployments occurred in 207 (all but 1811, 1826, 1828 to 30, 1834, 1837, 1845, 1850, 1861, 1862, 1869, 1872, 1897, 1947, 1957, 1961, 1977, and 1979).

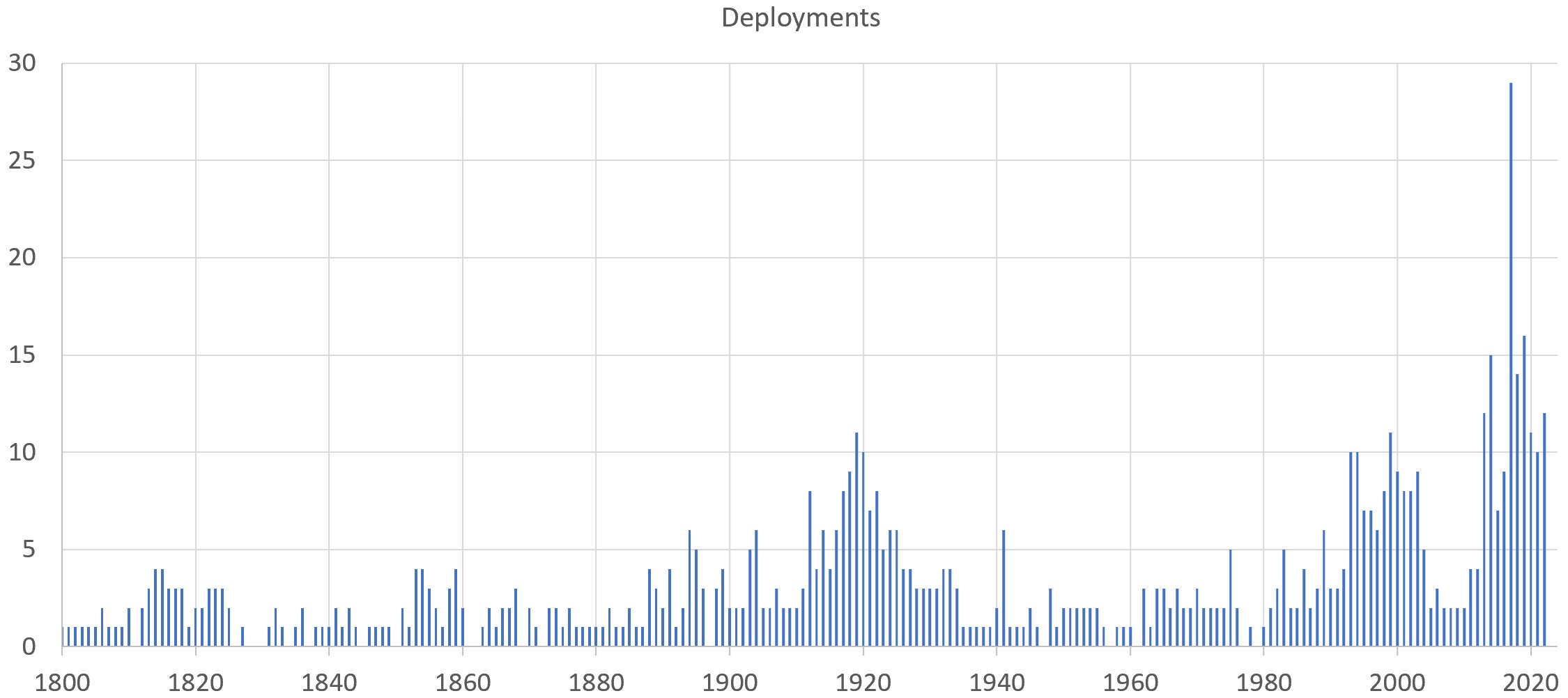
Graph of US military deployments per year

- The largest number of deployments in any one year was 29 in 2017, followed by 16 in 2019, 15 in 2014, and 14 in 2018.
- A few deployments were not for combat, including three evacuations in 1974 and 75 and typhoon relief in 2012 and 13.
- From the descriptions (See report; full descriptions not included in table below.)
  - Some of the descriptions start with more details about the timeframe of the deployments, as shown in column "Time preface" below.
  - For 47 deployments, the descriptions state specifically that they were "to protect American interests [or property]," as indicated by "Y" in column "US interest" below.)
- Of the 481 deployments, five were declared wars. The column "Decl'ns" below indicates how many war declarations were made in each of those five, totaling eleven.
- The report cites sources for some of its data with 157 footnotes, as indicated in the "Footnotes" column below (mostly for deployments after 2013).

== List of deployments ==
Listing of Notable Deployments of U.S. Military Forces Overseas, 1798-April 2023
#	Start	End	Deployment	Time preface	US Interest	Decl'ns	Footnotes	Related article
1	1798	1800	Undeclared naval war with France					Quasi-War
2	1801	1805	Tripoli, Libya					First Barbary War
3	1806		Mexico (Spanish territory)					
4	1806	1810	Gulf of Mexico					
5	1810		West Florida (Spanish territory)					West Florida Controversy
6	1812		Amelia Island and other parts of east Florida, then under Spain					Patriot War (Florida)
7	1812	1815	War of 1812	On June 18, 1812,		1		War of 1812
8	1813		West Florida (Spanish territory)					
9	1813	1814	Marquesas Islands					Nuku Hiva Campaign
10	1814		Spanish Florida					
11	1814	1825	Caribbean					West Indies anti-piracy operations of the United States
12	1815		Algiers					Second Barbary War
13	1815		Tripoli, Libya					
14	1816		Spanish Florida					
15	1816	1818	Spanish Florida—First Seminole War					
16	1817		Amelia Island (Spanish territory off northeast Florida)					
17	1818		Oregon					
18	1820	1823	Africa					
19	1822		Cuba					
20	1823		Cuba					
21	1824		Cuba	In October 1824,				
22	1824		Puerto Rico (Spanish territory)					
23	1825		Cuba	In March 1825,				
24	1827		Greece	In October and November 1827,				Aegean Sea anti-piracy operations
25	1831	1832	Falkland Islands/Malvinas, Argentina		Y		2	
26	1832		Sumatra	From February 6 to 9, 1832,				
27	1833		Argentina	From October 31 to November 15, 1833,				
28	1835	1836	Peru	December 10, 1835, to January 24, 1836, and August 31 to December 7, 1836.	Y			
29	1836		Mexico					
30	1838	1839	Sumatra	December 24, 1838, to January 4, 1839.				
31	1840		Fiji Islands	July.				
32	1841		Taputeoiea (Tabiteuea) or Drummond's Island, Kingsmill Group					
33	1841		Samoa	February 24, 1841,				
34	1842		Mexico					
35	1843		China					
36	1843		Africa	From November 29 to December 16, 1843,				
37	1844		Mexico					
38	1846	1848	Mexican War	On May 13, 1846,		1		Mexican–American War
39	1849		Smyrna (İzmir, Turkey)	In July,				
40	1851		Turkey					
41	1851		Johanns Island (east of Africa)	August.				
42	1852	1853	Argentina	February 3 to 12, 1852; September 17, 1852, to April 1853.	Y			
43	1853		Nicaragua	From March 11 to 13, 1853,	Y			
44	1853	1854	Japan					
45	1853	1854	Ryukyu and Bonin Islands					
46	1854		China	April 4 to June 15 to 17, 1854.	Y			
47	1854		Nicaragua	July 9 to 15.				
48	1855		China	May 19 to 21, 1855.	Y			
49	1855		Fiji Islands	September 12 to November 4, 1855.				1855 Fiji expedition
50	1855		Uruguay	November 25 to 29, 1855.	Y			
51	1856		Panama, Republic of New Grenada	September 19 to 22, 1856.	Y			
52	1856		China	October 22 to December 6, 1856.	Y			Second Opium War
53	1857		Nicaragua	April to May, November to December 1857.				Filibuster War
54	1858		Uruguay	January 2 to 27, 1858.	Y			
55	1858		Fiji Islands	October 6 to 16, 1858.				1858 Fiji expedition
56	1858	1859	Turkey					
57	1859		Paraguay					
58	1859		Mexico					
59	1859		China	July 31 to August 2, 1859.	Y			Second Opium War
60	1860		Angola, Portuguese West Africa	March 1, 1860.				
61	1860		Colombia (Bay of Panama)	September 27 to October 8, 1860.	Y			
62	1863		Japan	July 16.				Battle of Shimonoseki Straits
63	1864		Japan	July 14 to August 3, 1864.				Shimonoseki Campaign
64	1864		Japan	September 4 to 14, 1864.				
65	1865		Panama	March 9 and 10, 1865.				
66	1866		China	From June 20 to July 7, 1866,				
67	1866		Mexico					
68	1867		Nicaragua					
69	1867		Formosa	June 13, 1867.				
70	1868		Japan (Osaka, Hiolo, Nagasaki, Yokohama, and Negata)	February 4 to 8, April 4 to May 12, June 12 and 13, 1868.	Y			
71	1868		Uruguay	February 7 and 8, 19 to 26, 1868.				
72	1868		Colombia	April.				
73	1870		Mexico	June 17 and 18, 1870.				
74	1870		Hawaiian Islands	September 21.				
75	1871		Korea	June 10 to 12, 1871.				US expedition to Korea
76	1873		Colombia (Bay of Panama)	May 7 to 22, September 23 to October 9, 1873.	Y			
77	1873	1896	Mexico					
78	1874		Hawaiian Islands	February 12 to 20, 1874.	Y			
79	1876		Mexico	May 18, 1876.	Y			
80	1882		Egypt	July 14 to 18, 1882.	Y			
81	1885		Panama (Colón)	January 18 and 19, 1885.				
82	1888		Korea	June.				
83	1888		Haiti	December 20, 1888.				
84	1888	1889	Samoa	November 14, 1888, to March 20, 1889.				
85	1889		Hawaiian Islands	July 30 and 31, 1889.	Y			Hawaiian rebellions
86	1890		Argentina					
87	1891		Haiti		Y			
88	1891		Bering Strait	June 22 to October 5, 1891.				
89	1891		Chile	August 28 to 30.				
90	1893		Hawaii	January 16 to April 1, 1893.	Y			
91	1894		Brazil	January.				
92	1894		Nicaragua	July 6 to August 7, 1894.	Y			
93	1894	1895	China	In March 1894,				
94	1894	1895	China					
95	1894	1896	Korea	July 24, 1894, to April 3, 1896.	Y			
96	1895		Colombia	March 8 to 9, 1895.	Y			
97	1896		Nicaragua	May 2 to 4, 1896.	Y			
98	1898		Nicaragua	February 7 and 8, 1898.	Y			
99	1898		The Spanish-American War	On April 25, 1898,		1		Spanish–American War
100	1898	1899	China	November 5, 1898, to March 15, 1899.				
101	1899		Nicaragua					
102	1899		Samoa	February-May 15, 1899.				
103	1899	1901	Philippine Islands		Y			Philippine–American War
104	1900		China	May 24 to September 28, 1900.				Boxer Rebellion
105	1901		Colombia (State of Panama)	November 20 to December 4, 1901.	Y			
106	1902		Colombia	April 16 to 23, 1902.	Y			
107	1902		Colombia (State of Panama)	September 17 to November 18, 1902.				
108	1903		Honduras	March 23 to 30 or 31, 1903.				
109	1903		Dominican Republic	March 30 to April 21, 1903.	Y			
110	1903		Syria	September 7 to 12, 1903.				
111	1903	1904	Abyssinia					
112	1903	1914	Panama		Y			
113	1904		Dominican Republic	January 2 to February 11, 1904.	Y			
114	1904		Tangier, Morocco					
115	1904		Panama	November 17 to 24, 1904.	Y			
116	1904	1905	Korea	January 5, 1904, to November 11, 1905.				
117	1906	1909	Cuba	September 1906 to January 23, 1909.				
118	1907		Honduras	March 18 to June 8, 1907.	Y			
119	1910		Nicaragua	May 19 to September 4, 1910.	Y			
120	1911		Honduras	January 26, 1911.	Y			
121	1911		China					
122	1912		Honduras					
123	1912		Panama					
124	1912		Cuba	June 5 to August 5, 1912.	Y			Negro Rebellion
125	1912		China	August 24 to 26, 1912.	Y			
126	1912		Turkey	November 18 to December 3, 1912.				
127	1912	1925	Nicaragua	August to November 1912.	Y			US occupation of Nicaragua
128	1912	1941	China					
129	1913		Mexico	September 5 to 7, 1913.				Mexican Border War
130	1914		Haiti	January 29 to February 9, February 20 to 21, October 19, 1914.				
131	1914		Dominican Republic	June and July 1914.				
132	1914	1917	Mexico					US occupation of Veracruz
133	1915	1934	Haiti	July 28, 1915, to August 15, 1934.				US occupation of Haiti
134	1916		China					
135	1916	1924	Dominican Republic	May 1916 to September 1924.				US occupation of the Dominican Republic
136	1917		China					
137	1917	1918	World War I	On April 6, 1917,		2		World War I
138	1917	1922	Cuba		Y			Cuban Civil War
139	1918	1919	Mexico					Mexican Border War
140	1918	1920	Panama					
141	1918	1920	Soviet Russia					Russian Civil War
142	1919		Dalmatia					
143	1919		Turkey					
144	1919		Honduras	September 8 to 12, 1919.				
145	1920		China	March 14, 1920.				
146	1920		Guatemala	April 9 to 27, 1920.	Y			
147	1920	1922	Russia (Siberia)	February 16, 1920, to November 19, 1922.				
148	1921		Panama-Costa Rica					
149	1922		Turkey	September and October 1922.	Y			
150	1922	1923	China					
151	1924		Honduras	February 28 to March 31, September 10 to 15, 1924.	Y			
152	1924		China	September.				
153	1925		China	January 15 to August 29, 1925.				
154	1925		Honduras	April 19 to 21, 1925.				
155	1925		Panama	October 12 to 23, 1925.	Y			
156	1926	1933	Nicaragua	May 7 to June 5, 1926; August 27, 1926, to January 3, 1933.				US occupation of Nicaragua
157	1926		China	August and September 1926.				
158	1927		China	February 1927.				
159	1932		China		Y			
160	1933		Cuba					
161	1934		China					
162	1940		Newfoundland, Bermuda, St. Lucia, Bahamas, Jamaica, Antigua, Trinidad, and British Guiana					
163	1941		Greenland					World War II
164	1941		Netherlands (Dutch Guiana)	In November,				
165	1941		Iceland					
166	1941		Germany	In spring 1941,				
167	1941	1945	World War II	On December 8, 1941,		6		World War II
168	1945		China	In October 1945,				Chinese Civil War
169	1946		Trieste, Italy					
170	1948		Palestine					
171	1948		Berlin, Germany					
172	1948	1949	China					
173	1950	1953	Korean War					Korean War
174	1950	1955	Formosa (Taiwan)	In June 1950				
175	1954	1955	China					First Taiwan Strait Crisis
176	1956		Egypt					
177	1958		Lebanon					
178	1959	1960	The Caribbean					
179	1962		Thailand					
180	1962		Cuba	On October 22, 1962,				
181	1962	1975	Laos	From October 1962 until 1975,				Laotian Civil War
182	1964		Congo					Congo Crisis
183	1964	1973	Vietnam War					Vietnam War
184	1965		Dominican Republic					US intervention in Dominican Civil War
185	1967		Congo					
186	1970		Cambodia					Cambodian Civil War
187	1974		Evacuation from Cyprus					
188	1975		Evacuation from Vietnam	On April 3, 1975,			3	
189	1975		Evacuation from Cambodia	On April 12, 1975,				
190	1975		South Vietnam	On April 30, 1975,				
191	1975		Mayaguez incident	On May 15, 1975,				
192	1976		Lebanon	On July 22 and 23, 1974,				
193	1976		Korea					
194	1978		Zaire	From May 19 through June 1978,				Shaba II
195	1980		Iran	On April 26, 1980,				
196	1981		El Salvador					Salvadoran Civil War
197	1981		Libya	On August 19, 1981,				
198	1982		Sinai, Egypt	On March 19, 1982,				
199	1982		Lebanon	On August 21, 1982,				
200	1982	1983	Lebanon	On September 29, 1982,				
201	1983		Egypt					
202	1983	1989	Honduras	In July 1983				
203	1983		Chad	On August 8, 1983,				
204	1983		Grenada	On October 25, 1983,				US invasion of Grenada
205	1984		Persian Gulf	On June 5, 1984,				
206	1985		Italy	On October 10, 1985,				US bombing of Libya
207	1986		Libya	On March 26, 1986,				
208	1986		Libya	On April 16, 1986,				
209	1986		Bolivia					
210	1987	1988	Persian Gulf					
211	1988		Panama	In mid-March and April 1988,				
212	1989		Libya	On January 4, 1989,				
213	1989		Panama	On May 11, 1989,				
214	1989		Andean Initiative in War on Drugs	On September 15, 1989,				
215	1989		Philippines	On December 2, 1989,				
216	1989	1990	Panama	On December 21, 1989,				US invasion of Panama
217	1990		Liberia	On August 6, 1990,				First Liberian Civil War
218	1990		Saudi Arabia	On August 9, 1990,				Gulf War
219	1991		Iraq	On January 18, 1991,				
220	1991		Iraq	On May 17, 1991,				
221	1991		Zaire (now DRC)	On September 25-27, 1991,				
222	1992		Sierra Leone	On May 3, 1992,				
223	1992		Kuwait	On August 3, 1992,				
224	1992		Iraq	On September 16, 1992,				
225	1992		Somalia	On December 10, 1992,				Somali Civil War
226	1993		Iraq	On January 19, 1993,				
227	1993		Iraq	On January 21, 1993,				
228	1993		Bosnia	On February 28, 1993,				
229	1993		Bosnia	On April 13, 1993,				
230	1993		Iraq					
231	1993		Somalia	On June 10, 1993,				Somali Civil War
232	1993		Iraq	On June 28, 1993,				
233	1993		Iraq					
234	1993		Former Yugoslav Republic of Macedonia	On July 9, 1993,			4	
235	1993		Haiti	On October 20, 1993,				
236	1994		Bosnia	On February 17, 1994,				
237	1994		Bosnia	On March 1, 1994,				
238	1994		Bosnia	On April 12, 1994,				
239	1994		Rwanda	On April 12, 1994,				
240	1994		FYROM	On April 19, 1994,				
241	1994		Haiti	On April 20, 1994,				
242	1994		Bosnia	On August 22, 1994,				
243	1994		Haiti	On September 21, 1994,				
244	1994		Bosnia	On November 22, 1994,				
245	1994		FYROM	On December 22, 1994,				
246	1995		Somalia	On March 1, 1995,				Somali Civil War
247	1995		Haiti	On March 21, 1995,				
248	1995		Bosnia	On May 24, 1995,				
249	1995		Bosnia	On September 1, 1995,				
250	1995		Haiti	On September 21, 1995,				
251	1995		Bosnia	On December 6, 1995,				
252	1995		Bosnia	On December 21, 1995,				
253	1996		Haiti	On March 21, 1996,				
254	1996		Liberia	On April 11, 1996,				
255	1996		Liberia	On May 20, 1996,				
256	1996		Central African Republic	On May 23, 1996,				
257	1996		Bosnia	On June 21, 1996,				
258	1996		Rwanda and Zaire (now DRC)	On December 2, 1996,				
259	1996		Bosnia	On December 20, 1996,				
260	1997		Albania	On March 15, 1997,				
261	1997		Congo and Gabon	On March 27, 1997,				
262	1997		Sierra Leone	On May 30, 1997,				
263	1997		Bosnia	On June 20, 1997,				
264	1997		Cambodia	On July 11, 1997,				
265	1997		Bosnia	On December 19, 1997,				
266	1998		Guinea-Bissau	On June 12, 1998,				
267	1998		Bosnia	On June 19, 1998,				
268	1998		Kenya and Tanzania	On August 10, 1998,				
269	1998		Albania	On August 18, 1998,				
270	1998		Afghanistan and Sudan	On August 21, 1998,				
271	1998		Liberia	On September 29, 1998,				
272	1998		Iraq					
273	1998	1999	Iraq					
274	1999		Bosnia	On January 19, 1999,				
275	1999		Kenya	On February 25, 1999,				
276	1999		Yugoslavia	On March 26, 1999,				
277	1999		Yugoslavia/Albania	On April 7, 1999,				
278	1999		Yugoslavia/Albania	On May 25, 1999,				
279	1999		Yugoslavia/Kosovo	On June 12, 1999,				
280	1999		Bosnia	On July 19, 1999,				
281	1999		East Timor	On October 8, 1999,				
282	1999		Yugoslavia/Kosovo	On December 15, 1999,				
283	1999	2000	Iraq					
284	2000		Bosnia	On January 25, 2000,				
285	2000		East Timor	On February 25, 2000,				
286	2000		Sierra Leone	On May 12, 2000,				
287	2000		Yugoslavia/Kosovo	On June 16, 2000,				
288	2000		Bosnia	On July 25, 2000,				
289	2000		East Timor	On August 25, 2000,				
290	2000		Yemen	On October 14, 2000,				
291	2000		Yugoslavia/Kosovo	On December 18, 2000,				
292	2001		East Timor	On March 2, 2001,				
293	2001		Yugoslavia/Kosovo	On May 18, 2001,				
294	2001		Bosnia	On July 25, 2001,				
295	2001		Iraq					
296	2001		East Timor	On August 31, 2001,				
297	2001		Terrorism threat	On September 24, 2001,				
298	2001		Afghanistan	On October 9, 2001,				
299	2001		Yugoslavia/Kosovo	On November 19, 2001,				
300	2002		Bosnia	On January 21, 2002,				
301	2002		East Timor	On February 28, 2002,				
302	2002		Terrorism threat	On March 20, 2002,				
303	2002		Yugoslavia/Kosovo	On May 17, 2002,				
304	2002		Bosnia	On July 22, 2002,				
305	2002		Terrorism threat	On September 20, 2002,				
306	2002		Cote d'Ivoire	On September 26, 2002,				
307	2002		Yugoslavia/Kosovo	On November 15, 2002,				
308	2003		Bosnia	On January 21, 2003,				
309	2003		Terrorism threat	On March 20, 2003,				
310	2003		Iraq War	On March 21, 2003,				
311	2003		Yugoslavia/Kosovo	On May 14, 2003,				
312	2003		Liberia	On June 9, 2003,				
313	2003		Bosnia	On July 22, 2003,				
314	2003		Liberia	On August 13, 2003,				
315	2003		Terrorism threat	On September 19, 2003,				
316	2003		Yugoslavia/Kosovo	On November 14, 2003,				
317	2004		Bosnia	On January 22, 2004,				
318	2004		Haiti	On February 25, 2004,	Y			
319	2004		Haiti	On March 2, 2004,				
320	2004		Terrorism/Bosnia and Haiti	On March 20, 2004,				
321	2004		Terrorism threat/Horn of Africa/Kosovo/Bosnia/Iraq	On November 4, 2004,				
322	2005		Terrorism threat/Horn of Africa/Kosovo/Bosnia	On May 20, 2005,				
323	2005		Terrorism threat/Horn of Africa/Kosovo/Bosnia/Iraq	On December 7, 2005,				
324	2006		Terrorism threat/Kosovo/Bosnia/Iraq	On June 15, 2006,				
325	2006		Lebanon	On July 18, 2006,				
326	2006		Terrorism threat/Horn of Africa/Kosovo/Bosnia	On December 15, 2006,				
327	2007		Terrorism threat/Kosovo/Afghanistan	On June 15, 2007,				
328	2007		Terrorism threat/Kosovo/Afghanistan	On December 14, 2007,				
329	2008		Terrorism threat/Kosovo/Afghanistan	On June 13, 2008,				
330	2008		Terrorism threat/Kosovo/Afghanistan	On December 16, 2008,				
331	2009		Terrorism threat/Afghanistan/Iraq/Kosovo	On June 15, 2009,				
332	2009		Terrorism threat/Afghanistan/Iraq/Kosovo	On December 5, 2009,				
333	2010		Terrorism threat/Afghanistan/Iraq/Kosovo	On June 15, 2010,				
334	2010		Terrorism threat/Afghanistan/Iraq/Kosovo	On December 15, 2010,				
335	2011		Terrorism threat/Afghanistan/Libya/Kosovo	On June 15, 2011,	Y			
336	2011		Libya	On March 21, 2011,				
337	2011		Central Africa	On October 14, 2011,				
338	2011		Terrorism threat/Afghanistan/Libya/Iraq/Kosovo	On December 15, 2011,				
339	2012		Somalia	On January 26, 2012,				Somali Civil War
340	2012		Terrorism threat/Afghanistan/Somalia/Yemen/Central Africa/Kosovo	On June 15, 2012,				
341	2012		Libya/Yemen	On September 14, 2012,	Y			
342	2012		Southern Philippines Humanitarian Assistance for Typhoon Bopha	On December 17, 2012,				Typhoon Bopha
343	2013		Afghanistan	On January 31, 2013,				
344	2013		Niger	On February 22, 2013,				
345	2013		Afghanistan	On April 10, 2013,				
346	2013		Jordan					
347	2013		Terrorism threat/Afghanistan/Somalia/Yemen/Central Africa	On June 14, 2013,				Somali Civil War
348	2013		Jordan					
349	2013		Afghanistan	On July 11, 2013,				
350	2013		Afghanistan	On September 24, 2013,				
351	2013		Leyte, Philippines Humanitarian Assistance for Typhoon Haiyan	On November 9, 2013,				Typhoon Haiyan
352	2013		Burundi and Central African Republic					
353	2013		Afghanistan	On December 13, 2013,				
354	2013		South Sudan	On December 18, 2013,				
355	2014		South Korea	On January 7, 2014,				
356	2014		Uganda, South Sudan, the Democratic Republic of the Congo, and the Central African Republic				5	
357	2014		Iraq	On June 19, 2014,			6	
358	2014		Iraq	June 30, 2014,			7	
359	2014		Ukraine	On August 6, 2014,			8	
360	2014		Iraq	On August 13, 2014,			9	
361	2014		Poland				10	
362	2014		Iraq	On September 2, 2014,			11, 12	
363	2014		Liberia, West Africa				13, 14	
364	2014		Liberia and Senegal, West Africa	On October 1, 2014,			15, 16	
365	2014		Iraq	On November 7, 2014,			17	
366	2014		Dakar, Senegal	On November 10, 2014,			18	
367	2014		Senegal and Liberia, West Africa	On November 14, 2014,			19	
368	2014		Vilnius, Lithuania	On November 24, 2014,			20	
369	2014		Iraq	On December 19, 2014,			21	
370	2015		Liberia and Senegal, West Africa	On January 8, 2015,			22	
371	2015		Korea	On March 20, 2015,			23	
372	2015		Iraq	On June 10, 2015,			24, 25	
373	2015		Iraq, Afghanistan, and Middle East	On August 5, 2015,			26, 27	
374	2015		Kuwait	On September 24, 2015,			28	
375	2015		Cameroon	On October 14, 2015,			29	
376	2015		Republic of Korea	On November 30, 2015,			30	
377	2016		Iraq	On June 11, 2016,			31	
378	2016		Afghanistan, Iraq, Syria, Turkey, Somalia, Yemen, Djibouti, Libya, Cuba, Central Africa, Egypt, Jordan, and NATO/Kosovo	On June 13, 2016,			32	Somali Civil War
379	2016		South Sudan				33, 34	
380	2016		Afghanistan	On August 5, 2016,			35	
381	2016		Afghanistan				36	
382	2016		Iraq				37, 38	
383	2016		Haiti	On October 7, 2016,			39	
384	2016		Yemen	On October 14, 2016,			40	
385	2016		Afghanistan	On December 8, 2016,			41	
386	2017		Europe	On January 5, 2017,			42	
387	2017		Iraq				43	
388	2017		Guatemala				44	
389	2017		Korea				45	
390	2017		Germany				46	
391	2017		Romania	On February 16, 2017,			47	
392	2017		Honduras				48	
393	2017		Germany	On February 22, 2017,			49	
394	2017		Germany	On February 24, 2017,			50	
395	2017		Greece				51	
396	2017		Syria	On March 10, 2017,			52, 53	
397	2017		Peru	On March 30, 2017,			54	
398	2017		Afghanistan				55	
399	2017		Uruguay	On April 6, 2017,			56	
400	2017		Korea	On May 19, 2017,			57	
401	2017		Iraq and Kuwait				58	
402	2017		Egypt	In late May,			59	
403	2017		England				60	
404	2017		Sri Lanka				61	
405	2017		England				62	
406	2017		Southwest Asia	On September 5,			63	
407	2017		Caribbean				64	
408	2017		Afghanistan	In September 2017,			65	
409	2017		Dominica				66	
410	2017		Niger				67, 68	
411	2017		Afghanistan, Syria, Africa, and elsewhere	On October 10, 2017,			69	
412	2017		Haiti	On November 18,			70	
413	2017		Poland				71	
414	2017		Iraq and Syria	on December 6, 2017,			72	
415	2018		Afghanistan	In February 2018,			73	
416	2018		Syria	On April 13, 2018,			74	
417	2018		Tanzania	From May to July 2018,			75	
418	2018		Central and South America				76	
419	2018		Thailand				77	
420	2018		Ukraine	On July 20, 2018,			78	
421	2018		Iceland				79	
422	2018		Europe and Africa				80, 81	
423	2018		Central and South America	On October 20, 2018,			82	
424	2018		Afghanistan	On October 18, 2018,			83, 84	
425	2018		Yemen				85	
426	2018		Africa	On November 15, 2018,			86	
427	2018		Syria				87	
428	2018		Honduras	On December 10, 2018,			88	
429	2019		Syria	In early January 2019,			89	
430	2019		South Korea				90	
431	2019		Iraq	On March 29, 2019,			91, 92	
432	2019		Afghanistan	On March 29, 2019,			93, 94	
433	2019		Japan	From April 9 to April 17,			95, 96	
434	2019		Lithuania				97	
435	2019		Japan				98	
436	2019		Indo-Pacific	On May 1, 2019,			99	
437	2019		Middle East	On May 10, 2019,			100, 101, 102, 103, 104	
438	2019		Venezuela				105	
439	2019		Poland	On June 12, 2019,			106	
440	2019		Saudi Arabia	On September 26, 2019,			107	
441	2019		Europe	On October 4, 2019,			108	
442	2019		Saudi Arabia	On October 11, 2019,			109	
443	2019		Afghanistan and South Korea	On December 5, 2019,			110	
444	2019		Middle East	On Dec. 31, 2019,			111, 112, 113	
445	2020		Kuwait	In early January 2020,			114	
446	2020		Africa	On February 12, 2020,			115	
447	2020		International	On March 25, 2020,			116	
448	2020		Afghanistan	On April 23, 2020,			117, 118, 119	
449	2020		Europe	On April 23, 2000,			120, 121	
450	2020		Iraq				122	
451	2020		Italy				123	
452	2020		Germany	On July 1, 2020,			124, 125	
453	2020		Europe	On September 24, 2020,			126	
454	2020		Central America	On November 12, 2020,			127	
455	2020		INDOPACOM region	On December 17, 2020,			128	
456	2021		Afghanistan and Iraq	On January 15, 2021,			129	
457	2021		Korea	On March 25, 2021,			130	
458	2021		Afghanistan	On April 15, 2021,			131	
459	2021		Europe	On July 6, 2021,			132	
460	2021		Haiti	On August 15, 2021,			133	
461	2021		Afghanistan	On August 15, 2021,				
462	2021		Afghanistan	On August 30, 2021,			134	
463	2021		Europe	On October 8, 2021,			135, 136	
464	2021		Europe	On December 16, 2021,			137	
465	2021		South Korea	On December 16, 2021,			138	
466	2022		Tonga				139, 140	
467	2022		Romania, Poland, and Germany	On February 2, 2022,			141, 142	
468	2022		Poland, Europe	On February 11, 2022,			143	
469	2022		Poland, Europe				144	
470	2022		Europe	On March 5, 2022,			145	
471	2022		Europe				146	
472	2022		Somalia	In May,			147	Somali Civil War
473	2022		Europe	On June 29, 2022,			148	
474	2022		Europe	On August 12, 2022,			149	
475	2022		Europe	On September 2, 2022,			150	
476	2022		Korea	On September 2, 2022,			151	
477	2022		Latin America and the Caribbean	On December 21, 2022,			152	
478	2023		Europe				153	
479	2023		Europe	On March 7, 2023,			154, 155	
480	2023		Korea	On March 8, 2023,			156	
481	2023		Sudan	On April 22, 2023,			157, 158	Evacuation from Sudan

== See also ==
- Military history of the United States
- United States militarism
- United States military deployments
