= Flight 222 =

Flight 222 may refer to:

- Flight 222 (film), 1986 Soviet film
- TANS Perú Flight 222, crashed on 9 January 2003
- TransAsia Airways Flight 222, crashed on 23 July 2014
