= Bonus (film) =

1975 Soviet film

- Directed by: Sergey Mikaelyan
- Written by: Alexander Gelman
- Starring: Yevgeny Leonov; Vladimir Samoilov; Oleg Yankovsky; Mikhail Gluzsky; Armen Dzhigarkhanyan
- Cinematography: Vladimir Chumak
- Production company: Lenfilm
- Release date: September 22, 1975
- Running time: 83 minutes
- Country: Soviet Union
- Language: Russian

Bonus (Russian: Премия, romanized: Premija) is a 1975 Soviet drama film directed by Sergey Mikaelyan. The film is based on the novel of the same name by Alexander Gelman.

== Plot ==
At a meeting of the Communist Party committee of a construction trust (Russian: строительного треста), one of the supervisors, Vasily Potapov, makes a surprise announcement. He and his team refuse to receive the bonus awarded for the alleged overfulfillment of plan targets. According to Potapov, the trust’s management routinely lowers targets so that the trust appears to exceed them easily. Potapov supports his argument with compelling economic data, gathered in collaboration with planner Dina Milenina, showing that the real issue lies with inefficient internal organization, not the uncontrollable factors that management blames.

Initially, the trust’s director, Batarcev, dismisses Potapov’s claims and tries to brand him as a "troublemaker" to deflect from the scandal. However, the Party Secretary Solomakhin unexpectedly sides with Potapov, sparking a debate among the committee members about the ethics of keeping the bonus. Just as Potapov’s argument gains traction, a phone call reveals that some of his team members have already accepted the bonus, leaving Potapov disillusioned. Nevertheless, Solomakhin insists that Potapov’s exit does not erase the issue. Ultimately, he calls for a vote, leading the committee, including the resistant Batarcev, to adopt Potapov’s proposal and reject the bonus, marking a collective stand for integrity over convenience.

== Cast ==
- Yevgeny Leonov as Vasilij Potapov, Supervisor
- Vladimir Samoilov as Pavel Batarcev, Trust Director
- Oleg Yankovsky as Lev . Solomahin, local Communist Party Secretary
- Mikhail Gluzsky as Boris Shatunov, Head of the Planning Department
- Armen Dzhigarkhanyan as Grigorij Frolovski, Chief Manager
- Leonid D'jachkov as Viktor Chernikov, Head of the Construction Department
- Aleksandr Pashutin as Oleg Kachnov, Supervisor
- Viktor Sergachjov as Roman Lyubaev, Safety Engineer
- Boryslav Brondukov as Aleksandr Zyubin, Foreman
- Svetlana Kryuchkova as Aleksandra Mikhajlovna, Crane Driver
- Mikhail Semyonov as Anatolij Zharikov, Secretary of the local Komsomol branch
- Nina Urgant as Dina Milenina, Economist

== Awards ==
- Grand prix of All-Union Film Festival (1975)
- Critics Award International Film Festival "Man-Work-Creation" in Poland (1975)
- USSR State Prize (1976)
- Gold Medal at the Avellino International Film Festival (Laceno d'oro - Festival del cinema neorealistico) (1976)
- Award at the Karlovy Vary International Film Festival (1976)
- Honorary award and diploma Barcelona International Film Festival (1976)
- Award at the Chicago International Film Festival (1976)
