= Grandmaster (1972 film) =

- Russian: Гроссмейстер
- Directed by: Sergey Mikaelyan
- Written by: Leonid Zorin
- Starring: Andrey Myagkov; Larisa Malevannaya; Emmanuil Vitorgan; Lyudmila Kasatkina; Mikhail Kozakov; Yefim Kopelyan
- Cinematography: Yevgeni Mezentsev
- Music by: Veniamin Basner
- Production company: Lenfilm
- Release date: 1972
- Running time: 87 min.
- Country: Soviet Union
- Language: Russian

Grandmaster (Russian: Гроссмейстер, romanized: Grossmeyster) is a 1972 Soviet sports drama film directed by Sergey Mikaelyan.

The film tells about a chess prodigy’s obsessive pursuit of brilliance which propels him to the pinnacle of his career but costs him love and connection, culminating in a high-stakes match that intertwines his triumph and personal longing.

== Plot ==
The film begins with a chess game being broadcast to an audience, among whom is young Sergey Khlebnikov and his father. Engrossed in the analysis of the match, Sergey’s father is hit by a car and dies on their way home. Even at the funeral, Sergey is absorbed in solving a chess problem. Left with his mother, Sergey dedicates himself entirely to chess. In childhood, he was close with a girl named Lena, and years later, they meet again, sparking a romantic connection. However, Lena's move to a different city separates them.

Years later, during a simultaneous chess exhibition, Sergey notices Lena among the players; she is now Elena Andreevna Dontsova, a translator. They rekindle their relationship and marry, but their life together suffers as Sergey’s dedication to chess eclipses his marriage, leading to their separation. Four years pass, during which Sergey’s coach, Viktor, advises him to focus more on results than on the aesthetic beauty of the game. Sergey achieves the grandmaster title and excels in tournaments. His old friend, Gena Orlov, follows his career and encourages him to reach out to Lena. Returning from an international competition, Sergey visits her, but they struggle to reconnect and part ways. Sergey advances to the final round of the Candidates Tournament for the World Championship title in Moscow. The entire country watches the match with bated breath. Lena tries to attend but ends up following from outside. In a tense final game, playing with the black pieces and under time pressure, Sergey skillfully sacrifices material to deliver a checkmate against an opponent with a substantial material advantage. The film concludes with Sergey and Viktor passionately analyzing the accuracy of the sacrifice on the street, as Lena watches them from afar.

== Cast ==
- Andrey Myagkov as Sergey Khlebnikov
- Viktor Korchnoi as Khlebnikov's coach
- Larisa Malevannaya as Elena Dontsova, Khlebnikov's wife
- Emmanuil Vitorgan as Orlov
- Lyudmila Kasatkina as Sergey's mother
- Mikhail Kozakov as Vladimir
- Yefim Kopelyan as Pavel Maksimovich
- Nikolay Volkov Sr. as old man from chess pavilion
- Tamara Sovchi as Anya
- Anatoliy Solonitsyn as Sergey's father
- Vladimir Tatosov as Sergey Aleksandrovich
- Petr Shelokhonov as Fyodor Matveyevich
- Mikhail Tal, Tigran Petrosian, Yuri Averbakh, Mark Taimanov, Paul Keres, Alexander Kotov, Mikael Tariverdiev as cameo
