= Lyudmila Vlasova =

Soviet ballet dancer (born 1942)

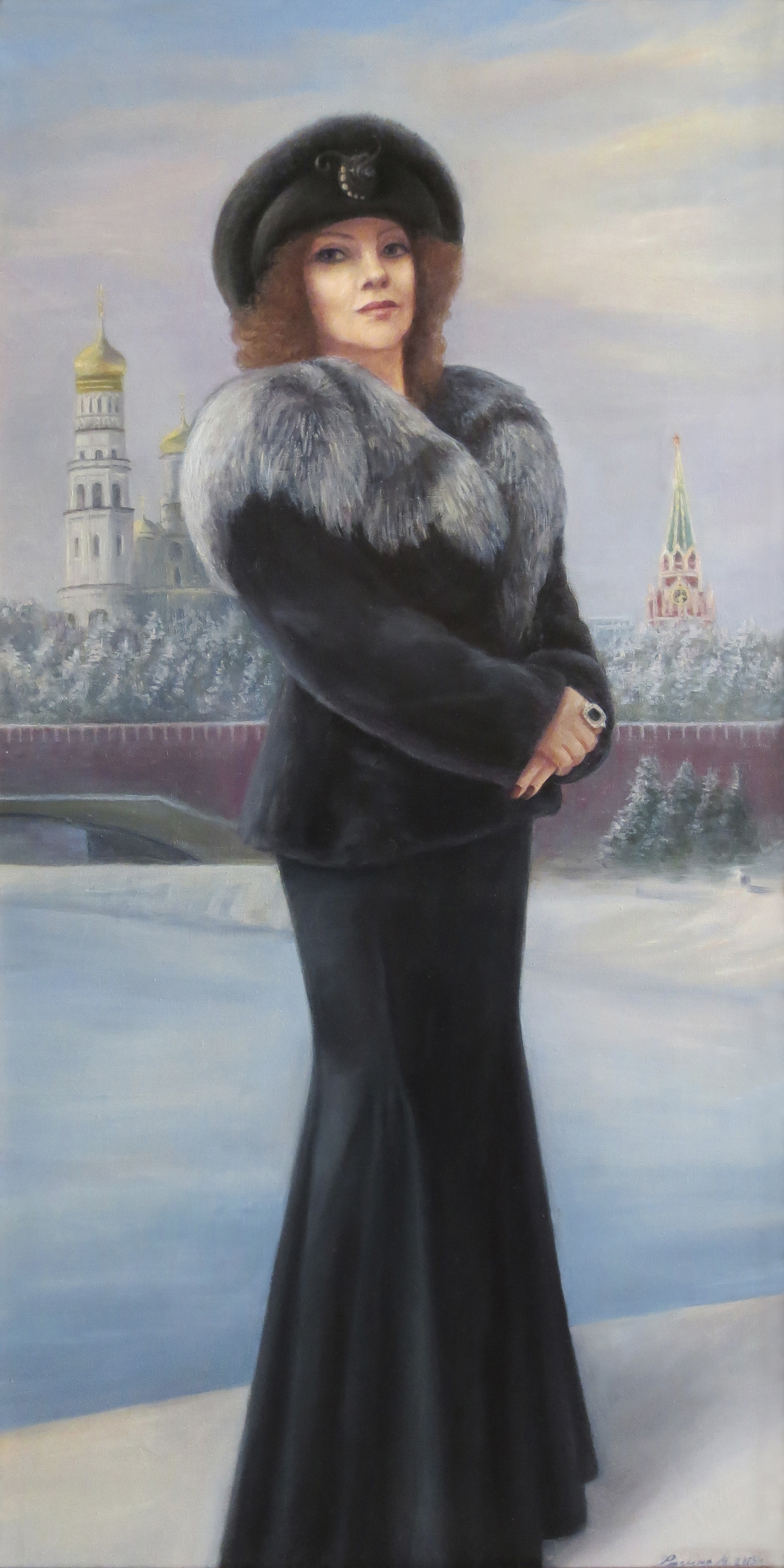
- Born: Lyudmila Iosifovna Vlasova; 2 March 1942 (age 83); Moscow, Russian Soviet Federative Socialist Republic, Soviet Union
- Occupation(s): Ballet dancer, choreographer, actress
- Spouses: Stanislav Vlasov (divorced) Alexander Godunov (m. 1971; div. 1982) Yury Statnik (m. 1981)

Lyudmila Iosifovna Vlasova (Russian: Людмила Иосифовна Власова; born 2 March 1942) is a Russian ballet dancer. She was a soloist of the Bolshoi Theatre (1961–1982), an actress, and at the present time is a choreographer of dance on ice.

== Early life ==
Vlasova was born in 1942 in Moscow, Soviet Union to Iosif Markov, a musician. Her mother worked in Red Army Theatre, but after marriage to Markov left the scene for the family life. After the war, her mother broke up with her father, and raised her by herself. Her mother realized the daughter's potential of becoming a ballerina, and turned her to choreography school.

== Career ==
Following graduation, Lyudmila Vlasova joined Bolshoi Theatre with which she performed in London and USA and danced with such greats as Maya Plisetskaya, Ekaterina Maximova, Natalia Bessmertnova and many others.

Lyudmila Vlasova was the leading ballerina of the Bolshoi Theatre, where in 1971, acting in the movies Naughty Limericks and Keystone, she met with Alexander Godunov. Soon they began to meet regularly and Lyudmila left her wealthy husband for him. They were one of the most beautiful couples in the Bolshoi Theatre of the 1970s.

The couple headlined foreign tours as well as the domestic productions of Swan Lake, Spartacus, Ivan the Terrible, Anna Karenina, The Rite of Spring, Love for Love, and Romeo and Juliet.

On 19 August 1979, after the last performance of their Romeo and Juliet tour in the New York Metropolitan Opera, Vlasova and Godunov returned to their New York hotel. The day after, however, the New York Post published a picture of Alexander Godunov with a headline: "After Baryshnikov, Nureyev, and Makarova, another star of Soviet ballet remained in the West". A few days later, Godunov contacted the US authorities with a request for political asylum. After news of his request reached the Soviet authorities, Lyudmila Vlasova was asked to board a flight to Moscow alone. However, the aircraft was detained by U.S. authorities just before take-off as the State Department verified that the Vlasova was returning to the Soviet Union voluntarily. This created an international incident, requiring the involvement of Leonid Brezhnev and Jimmy Carter, leaders of the USSR and the U.S., respectively. After three days of negotiation, Vlasova was allowed to fly back home. The incident was dramatized in a 1985 movie, Flight 222.

After returning to Moscow, Vlasova continued to dance at the Bolshoi Theater until her retirement. After two years, Vlasov and Godunov officially got divorced through the embassy.

After Vlasova's ballet career, she became a sought-after choreographer in ice skating. In this capacity, she worked with prominent skaters such as:

- Irina Lobacheva / Ilia Averbukh
- Anna Semenovich / Vladimir Fedorov
- Barbara Fusar-Poli / Maurizio Margaglio
- Federica Faiella / Massimo Scali
- Elena Ilinykh / Nikita Katsalapov
- Anna Cappellini / Luca Lanotte

== Family ==
- Her first husband – Stanislav Vlasov, ballet
- The second – Alexander Godunov, ballet.
- Third (since 1981) – singer Yury Statnik (1947). The soloist (since 1976) of the Bolshoi Theatre, Honored Artist of the Moldavian SSR (1976)
