= Sergey Mikaelyan =

Russian film director

- Сергей Микаэлян
- Born: Sergey Gerasimovich Mikaelyan; 1 November 1923; Moscow, Russian SFSR; Soviet Union
- Died: 10 December 2016 (aged 93)
- Occupations: Film director Screenwriter
- Years active: 1965-1986

Sergey Gerasimovich Mikaelyan (Russian: Серге́й Гера́симович Микаэля́н; 1 November 1923 – 10 December 2016) was a Soviet film director and winner of the USSR State Prize (1976). He directed ten films between 1965 and 1986. His 1983 film Love by Request was entered into the 33rd Berlin International Film Festival.

== Biography ==
Sergey Mikaelyan was born on 1 November 1923 in Moscow.

When he was seventeen he voluntarily served in the Great Patriotic War and was wounded at Rzhev. In 2015 he published a novella titled "Not Killed at Rzhev" (Russian: Не убит подо Ржевом) about his experiences in the war.

In 1951 he graduated from the directing department of GITIS (workshop of Boris Zakhava, Maria Knebel, A. Popov), and then, in 1959, the director's course at the Mosfilm.

Sergey Mikaelyan staged performances in the Saratov, Gorky, Moscow, and Leningrad theaters. He also worked as the chief director of the Tashkent Russian Theatre named after M. Gorky (1954-1956). Since 1956 served as director of the film studio Lenfilm. From 1959 to 1961 was director at the Gorky Film Studio.

Since 1989, Mikaelyan was the artistic director of the "Petropolis" studio. He died on 10 December 2016 in St. Petersburg and was buried in the Serafimovskoe Cemetery.

== Awards ==
- USSR State Prize (1976) for the film "Bonus" (1974)
- Honored Artist of the RSFSR (1976)
- All-Union Film Festival prize (1983) for the film "Love by Request" (1982)
- People’s Artist of the RSFSR (1983)

== Selected filmography ==
- Going Inside a Storm (1965)
- Bare et liv – Historien om Fridtjof Nansen (1968)
- Grandmaster (1972)
- Bonus (1974)
- Widows (1975)
- Love by Request (1983)
- Flight 222 (1986)
