= Jean Kirkpatrick (sociologist) =

American sociologist (1923–2000)

Jean Kirkpatrick (March 2, 1923 - June 19, 2000) was an American sociologist, researcher, and visionary leader whose work fundamentally reshaped addiction recovery for women. Drawing from both her academic expertise and her lived experience with alcoholism, she founded Women for Sobriety in 1975., establishing one of the first gender responsive recovery programs in the world.

At the time, the dominant recovery framework was the Twelve Steps model, which emphasized surrender, powerlessness, and moral inventory. While transformative for many, Kirkpatrick recognized a critical gap. Women often entered recovery already burdened by low self esteem, shame, and societal conditioning that reinforced self-doubt. Through five years of rigorous research and observation, she developed a fundamentally different approach rooted in empowerment, self efficacy, emotional growth, and cognitive transformation.

Her groundbreaking model introduced the Thirteen Acceptance Statements, a framework designed to help women actively reshape their thinking, build self worth, and reclaim agency in their lives. Rather than focusing on deficits, Women for Sobriety centers on strengths, encouraging women to see themselves as capable, competent, caring, and compassionate. Kirkpatrick argued that women did not need another system reinforcing learned helplessness, but rather one that restored confidence, autonomy, and inner strength.

At a time when few programs addressed the unique psychological and social realities women faced, Women for Sobriety created a space where women could recover without reinforcing negative narratives. The impact was immediate and far reaching. In just over a decade, the program expanded to approximately 250 self-help groups across the United States and internationally, including Australia, Africa, England, and Germany. It introduced a new paradigm in recovery, one that validated women’s experiences and demonstrated that empowerment-based models could be effective and transformative.

Kirkpatrick’s personal journey was foundational for her work. She began drinking in high school, and alcohol use continued to create significant challenges throughout her early academic life. Although she struggled during her college years, she ultimately graduated from Moravian College at age 27. She went on to earn a master’s degree from Lehigh University four years later.

After participating in a Twelve Step program during a period of sobriety, she enrolled in a Ph.D. program in sociology at the University of Pennsylvania. However, like many navigating recovery, she experienced relapse and stepped away before completing the degree. She ultimately completed her Ph.D. in 1971, sixteen years after she first began the program. Her academic journey, marked by disruption and determination, deeply informed her understanding of recovery as a nonlinear but achievable process.

Kirkpatrick’s contributions to the field of addiction recovery have been widely recognized. In 1978, she received the Raymond Haupert Humanitarian Award from Moravian College. for her pioneering efforts to support women struggling with alcoholism. Through her writing, speaking, and program development, she helped shift the conversation around recovery to include gender responsive and psychologically informed approaches.

== Publications ==
Kirkpatrick authored several influential works that extended the reach of her philosophy and program. Her publications include A Fresh Start (1977), a biographical account of her journey; Turnabout: Help for a New Life (1978); Goodbye Hangovers, Hello Life Self Help for Women (1986); and On the Road to Sell Recovery (1991).
