= Dictatorships and Double Standards =

1979 essay by Jeane Kirkpatrick

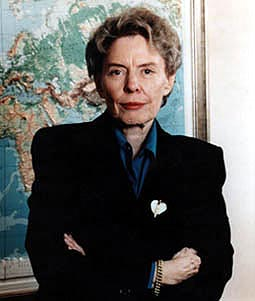
Jeane Kirkpatrick

"Dictatorships and Double Standards" is an essay by Jeane Kirkpatrick published in the November 1979 issue of Commentary magazine, which criticized the foreign policy of the Carter administration. It is also the title of a 270-page book written by Kirkpatrick in 1982.

The article in Commentary magazine in 1979 is credited with leading directly to Kirkpatrick's becoming an adviser to Ronald Reagan and thus her appointment as United States Ambassador to the United Nations. Hence, the views expressed in Kirkpatrick's essay influenced the foreign policy of the Reagan administration, particularly with regard to Latin America.

Kirkpatrick argued that by demanding rapid liberalization in traditionally autocratic countries, the Carter administration and previous administrations had delivered those countries to anti-American opposition groups that proved more repressive than the governments they overthrew. She further accused the administration of a "double standard" in that it had never applied its rhetoric on the necessity of liberalization to the affairs of communist governments.

The essay compares traditional autocracies and Communist regimes:

[Traditional autocrats] do not disturb the habitual rhythms of work and leisure, habitual places of residence, habitual patterns of family and personal relations. Because the miseries of traditional life are familiar, they are bearable to ordinary people who, growing up in the society, learn to cope.... [Revolutionary Communist regimes] claim jurisdiction over the whole life of the society and make demands for change that so violate internalized values and habits that inhabitants flee by the tens of thousands.

Kirkpatrick concluded that while the United States should encourage liberalization and democracy in autocratic countries, it should not do so when the government is facing violent overthrow and should expect gradual change rather than immediate transformation.

== Criticism ==
AFL–CIO's Tom Kahn criticized conceptual problems and strategic consequences in Kirkpatrick's analysis. In particular, Kahn suggested that policy should promote democracy even in the countries dominated by Soviet communism. Kahn argued that the Polish labor-union Solidarity deserved United States support and even in its first years demonstrated that civil society could expand and that free labor unions could be organized despite Communist regimes. Kirkpatrick's analysis of Communism underestimated the democratic potential of the working class.

Ted Galen Carpenter of the Cato Institute noted that while Communist movements tend to depose rival authoritarians, the traditional authoritarian regimes supported by the United States came to power by overthrowing democracies. Thus, he concludes that while Communist regimes are more difficult to eradicate, traditional autocratic regimes "pose the more lethal threat to functioning democracies".

== See also ==
- Authoritarian conservatism
- Kirkpatrick Doctrine
- U.S. policy towards authoritarianism
