= Alexander Godunov =

Soviet and American ballet dancer and film actor (1949–1995)

- Александр Годунов
- Born: Alexander Borisovich Godunov; November 28, 1949; Yuzhno-Sakhalinsk, Sakhalin Oblast, Russian SFSR
- Died: May 1995 (aged 45) (Note: Godunov's precise date of death is uncertain, and has been listed as early as May 13 in some biographical material.); West Hollywood, California, U.S.
- Citizenship: Soviet (1949–1982); United States (1987–1995)
- Occupations: Ballet dancer; actor; ballet coach
- Years active: 1958–1995
- Spouse: Lyudmila Vlasova (m. 1971; div. 1982)
- Partner(s): Jacqueline Bisset (1981–1988)

Alexander Borisovich Godunov (Russian: Александр Борисович Годунов; November 28, 1949 – May 1995) was a Soviet and American ballet dancer and film actor. A member of the Bolshoi Ballet, he became the troupe's premier danseur, and received the title of Honored Artist of the RSFSR in 1976. Three years later, he defected to the United States. While continuing to dance, he also began working as a supporting actor in Hollywood films. He had prominent roles in films such as Witness (1985) and Die Hard (1988).

== Early life ==
Godunov was born to Russian parents in Yuzhno-Sakhalinsk, Sakhalin Oblast in the Russian Far East. He began his ballet studies at the age of nine in Riga in 1958 in the same class as Mikhail Baryshnikov. He said his mother put him in ballet to prevent him from becoming "a hooligan". He and Baryshnikov became friends and helped each other throughout their years there.

== Career ==
=== Dance ===
Godunov joined the Bolshoi Ballet in 1971 and rose to become Premier danseur. His teachers there included Aleksey Yermolayev.

In 1973, Godunov won a gold medal at the Moscow International Ballet Competition. He received the title of Honored Artist of the RSFSR in 1976. After playing Vronsky in 1975's Anna Karenina and Lemisson, the Royal minstrel, in the 1978 film version of J. B. Priestley's 31 June, he became well-known in the Soviet Union as a movie actor.

=== Defection ===
On August 21, 1979, while on a tour with the Bolshoi Ballet in New York City, Godunov contacted authorities and asked for political asylum. After discovering his absence, the KGB responded by putting his wife, Lyudmila Vlasova, a soloist with the company, on a plane to Moscow, but the flight was stopped before takeoff. After three days, with involvement by President Jimmy Carter and Soviet leader Leonid Brezhnev, the U.S. State Department was satisfied that Vlasova had chosen to return to the Soviet Union of her own free will and allowed the plane to depart. The incident was dramatized in the Soviet docudrama film Flight 222 (1985). Vlasova later said that while Godunov loved American culture and had long desired to live in the United States, she felt she was "too Russian" to live in the United States. The couple divorced in 1982.

=== In the United States ===
Godunov joined American Ballet Theatre and danced as a principal dancer until 1982, when he had a falling-out with his old friend Baryshnikov, the director of the company. A press release for American Ballet Theatre stated a change in the troupe's repertoire did not provide Godunov with sufficient roles. Following his release, he traveled with his own troupe and danced as a guest artist around the world with a number of prominent ballet troupes. He became a naturalized citizen of the United States in 1987.

Godunov also began working in Hollywood as a film actor. In 1985, he played a prominent supporting role as Daniel Hochleitner, an Amish farmer and romantic rival to Harrison Ford's character in the Oscar-winning film Witness. His other acting roles included a comically narcissistic symphony conductor in The Money Pit (1986), and the imposing henchman Karl in Die Hard (1988). He declined roles that typecast him as a dancer or as an action villain, as in Die Hard. This may have hampered his career. In 1992, he played the main villain in the horror-comedy Waxwork II: Lost in Time (1992). In the mid-1990s, he appeared in Canadian television commercials for Labatt Ice beer.

His last acting role was in the action film The Dogfighters, with Robert Davi and Ben Gazzara. The film premiered posthumously in November 1995, several months after Godunov's death that May.

== Personal life ==
Godunov married Lyudmila Vlasova, a soloist with the Bolshoi Ballet, in 1971. The couple had no children and divorced in 1982 after a long separation.

In 1981, Godunov began dating actress Jacqueline Bisset after meeting her at a party in New York City. They broke up in 1988.

=== Death ===
Godunov drank alcohol to excess, which affected his health as he got older. On May 18, 1995, Godunov's friends became concerned after an uncharacteristic lack of phone calls from him. A nurse, who had not heard from him since May 8, went to his home in the Shoreham Towers, West Hollywood, California, where his body was discovered. He had been dead for several days. Godunov's death was determined to be due to complications from hepatitis secondary to chronic alcoholism.

Godunov was cremated, and his ashes were scattered into the Pacific Ocean. A memorial to him at Gates Mortuary in Los Angeles is engraved with the epitaph "His future remained in the past."

== Filmography ==
Year	Title	Role	Notes
1970	Carmen-suite	Jose	
1971	Moscow Fantasy	Young Dancer	Uncredited
1975	Anna Karenina	Alexei Vronsky	
1978	31 June	Lemisson	
1980	A Portrait of Giselle	Himself	
1983	Godunov: The World To Dance In	Himself	
1985	Witness	Daniel Hochleitner	
1986	The Money Pit	Max Beissart	
1988	Die Hard	Karl	
1990	The Runestone	Sigvaldson	
1992	Waxwork II: Lost in Time	Scarabis	
1994	North	Amish Dad	
1995	The Dogfighters	Lothar Krasna	Final film role

== See also ==
- List of dancers
- List of Russian ballet dancers
- List of Soviet and Eastern Bloc defectors
