= United States militarism =

Reliance of the United States on its military force

United States militarism refers to the reliance of the United States on its military force to pursue foreign policy goals that can be achieved more effectively by other means.

Militarism has been defined as the tendency to regard military efficiency as the supreme ideal of the state, overshadowing all other interests. In a militarized society, military institutions, the military–industrial complex and military ways of life are ranked above the ways of civilian life, and military mentality is carried over into the civilian sphere." Since the end of the Cold War, the US military has continued to grow even without any existential threat to the US, as it currently spends more than 40% of all military expenditures worldwide and has military forces stationed in more than 150 countries.

The ongoing war on terror and the invasions of Iraq and Afghanistan have all contributed significantly to the current prominent role of the United States Department of Defense in American politics. Administrations of George W. Bush and Barack Obama have also ensured that military leaders dominate positions related to national security, to the detriment of diplomatic solutions with Iran, North Korea, or the Middle East. The recent administrations, as early as President Bill Clinton, have thus placed the Department of Defense in a position of unprecedented power and influence.

Further information: List of countries with highest military expenditures

Military spending, top 25 countries by % GDP, 2024
Country	% GDP spent on military
Ukraine	34.5
Israel	8.8
Algeria	8.0
Saudi Arabia	7.3
Russia	7.1
Myanmar	6.8
Oman	5.6
Armenia	5.5
Azerbaijan	5.0
Kuwait	4.8
Jordan	4.8
Burkina Faso	4.7
Mali	4.2
Poland	4.2
Burundi	3.8
Brunei	3.6
Morocco	3.5
United States	3.4
Estonia	3.4
Colombia	3.4
Latvia	3.3
Greece	3.1
Lithuania	3.1
Chad	3.0
Kyrgyzstan	3.0

Military spending, top 25 countries by PPP, 2024
Country	$billions spent on military
United States	997
China	567
Russia	401
India	308
Ukraine	183
South Korea	96
Germany	99
Japan	91
France	91
United Kingdom	86
Brazil	64
Poland	62
Italy	60
Turkey	59
Indonesia	47
Colombia	43
Mexico	40
Spain	39
Australia	31
Canada	31
Netherlands	21
Philippines	21
Romania	21
Greece	17
Malaysia	14

== Background ==
Throughout the first two centuries of American history, a potent military force was necessary to face immediate threats at the time. When these threats were lifted, the military establishment was reduced in size by policymakers. That is, the army assembled for each crisis vanished as soon as that crisis ended. This was the case in 1865, 1918, and 1945, corresponding to the Civil War, and the First and Second World Wars, respectively. For instance, the million-men-strong Union Army of 1865 dwindled to just 57,000 in a year and to less than 30,000 in another five years. This pattern continued even after the Second World War when the United States had taken on the responsibilities of a superpower. The US Army had more than eight million officers and soldiers on V-J Day in 1945. Only 1.8 million people were still on active duty after a year, and that number was cut in half again the next year.

=== Cold War ===
With the start of the Cold War in 1947 and after the enactment of the National Security Act in the same year, the US military forces were automatically included in the national security doctrine during peacetime. Over the following four decades, military influence increased, leading to the 1986 Defense Reorganization Act, also known as the Goldwater-Nichols Act, which designated the chairman of the Joint Chiefs of Staff as the "principal military adviser to the President, the National Security Council, and the Secretary of Defense." Civilian academics and business researchers, including Henry Kissinger and Herman Kahn, came to prominence during the Cold War and significantly promoted the use of force. The complexity of the nuclear policy may have contributed to the rise of these "defense intellectuals" and their think tanks.

=== Post Cold War era ===
After the end of the Cold War, the United States took advantage of the collapse of the Soviet Union and the Warsaw Pact by encouraging the newly liberated nations to join the NATO, the political and military alliance of the West. Since then, it has been a policy of the US to maintain military superiority over potential adversaries. This era is marked by an increased propensity to employ force, which might have normalized war. During the Cold War era, from 1945 to 1988, there were six significant US military operations abroad. In comparison, since the fall of the Berlin Wall in 1989, nine significant military interventions have taken place, from the 1989 Operation Just Cause (the ouster of Manuel Noriega) to the 2003 Operation Iraqi Freedom (the overthrow of Saddam Hussein). In this latter period, the convergence of CIA and JSOC operators was "so complete that US officials ranging from congressional staffers to high-ranking CIA officers said they often [found] it difficult to distinguish agency [CIA] from military personnel."

Since the end of the Vietnam War in 1975, some have contended that the United States has evolved into a neo-militaristic state, characterized by its reliance on a relatively limited number of volunteer combatants, substantial reliance on sophisticated technologies, and rationalization and extension of government recruitment and advertising campaigns. The American response to the 9/11 attacks as a "global" war on terror promoted the recent remilitarization of the Western countries, and introduced the Middle East as the source of threats to the rest of the world, which helped justify the bigger efforts after 9/11 to forcefully reshape the region.

== Rationale ==
According to the prevailing national security consensus, major politicians today assume that American military dominance is an unquestionable virtue and proof of greater American superiority. They believe that this armed might holds the key to establishing a world order that supports American values. One outcome of this consensus over the past 25 years has been the militarization of US policies and the promotion of tendencies that suggest American culture as a whole is becoming more and more enamored with its self-image as the unrivaled military power. There are many distinct ways in which this new American militarism shows itself. It does so, first and foremost, in terms of the size, expense, and organizational structure of America's current military system.

The historian Andrew Bacevich maintains that American leaders in the past considered the use of force as proof that diplomacy had failed. Today, in the words of Vice President Dick Cheney, using force "makes your diplomacy more effective going forward, dealing with other problems." Similarly, President Bush described the 2003 invasion of Iraq as a preventive war, saying elsewhere that, "this country must go on the offense and stay on the offense."

A number of authors (Note: See Boot (2002), Ferguson (2003), Ferguson (2004), Ferguson & Schularick (2006), Lal (2004), McCarthy (2014), Kane (2014), Cohen (2016). See also Mitchener & Weidenmier (2005).) (Note: Just noticed that these sources aren't really listed in the bibliography below.) contend that the US should accept the status of a worldwide empire given the country's power. According to Coyne and Hall, these scholars believe that an interventionist foreign policy strengthens domestic institutions by promoting peace, stability, and freedom on a global scale. Bacevich similarly argues that American policy is to uphold global order and "lead, save, liberate, and ultimately transform the world.". According to Coyne & Hall the western liberal values that the US government promotes in other cultures by leveraging the country's military and economic might, are frequently neglected, in order to maintain control over remote populations.

== Militarism in the American culture ==
While allowing the government to provide security is frequently seen as essential to upholding a free society, it may also give the state the capacity to trample on freedom in the name of safety. In this vein, Senator William Fulbright warned (Note: Who did he warn? Do we know that?) that the "militarism that has crept up on us [the United States] is bringing about profound changes in the character of our society and government—changes that are slowly undermining democratic procedure and values." The historian Arthur Ekirch believes that Americans were historically skeptical of an aggressive foreign policy. This skepticism, however, began to disappear during World War II, further eroded later on by the Cold War and the establishment of a permanent war economy centered on preparing for future conflicts. The American public thus gradually began to believe that using force aggressively is the best way to address foreign issues or challenges in the decades after the end of World War II.

According to the historian Andrew Bacevich, the lives of many young Americans are now deeply entrenched with militarism, and war has become the new normal for them. General Shoup suggests that "millions of proud, patriotic, and frequently bellicose and militaristic citizens" support their government's involvement in foreign wars and contribute to America's militaristic culture. American political figures are thus shaped by this popular culture and conform to it. When talking about significant international issues, such as Iran and its nuclear program, American officials now nearly always say, "Nothing is off the table," threatening the use of direct military force. In the opinion of Chalmers Johnson, no single war or event caused America's militarization. Rather, it stems from the varied experiences of American citizens in the armed forces, ideas about war that evolve from one war to another, and the growth of a massive arms industry.

With an estimated 270 million weapons, gun ownership in the US far exceeds the rest of the world. In terms of the number of random massacres, rampage killings, and serial killings, the US similarly tops all other nations. On the global market, it is the largest producer and supplier of all varieties of military-style weaponry. Shoup writes that "the American people have become more and more accustomed to militarism, to uniforms, to the cult of the gun, and to the violence of combat." The Army and the government of the United States actively promote the development of a martial spirit throughout the nation with initiatives such as supporting military education in the country's high schools, hosting military competitions in major cities, promoting marksmanship competitions, and encouraging civilian attendance at military maneuvers. The American military also works closely with major studios to ensure favourable presentation.

Military service is not a career choice for 80% of US teenagers, while 55% of adults and 67% of parents are unlikely to recommend it to teens.

== Role of propaganda ==
Donald Trump and Pete Hegseth narrate a military propaganda video, 2025

By emphasizing the risks from external threats and portraying the state as the ultimate source of order and safety, propaganda can help foster a culture of militarism that prioritizes national security over domestic, economic, political, and social institutions. By highlighting external threats, propaganda may also draw the citizens' attention away from the basic and ongoing struggle between domestic government authority and liberty. According to Coyne and Hall, American politicians regularly incite anxieties about new and severe dangers, necessitating more money and more control over both Americans and foreigners. They also accuse the US government of disseminating incomplete and inaccurate information about the threats to American citizens.

=== Sport ===
Since World War I, sports have been used by the American government to garner support for military actions and promote military unification. In particular, sociologist Alan Bairner views sports as a common vehicle for the expression of nationalist sentiment in the service of politicians. For instance, the National Football League has been enlisted by authorities to help create and sustain support for American military and foreign policy, since the 9/11 attacks. After the attacks, several professional sports teams received funding from the Department of Defense to stage patriotic events to raise support for the war in Iraq and the broader battle against terror.

== Civilian oversight ==
There have been instances of the White House using force without prior congressional approval over the past forty years. During the Ford administration (1974-1977), Congress was not involved in the Mayaguez rescue effort. Similarly, Iran's rescue operation was deemed too sensitive for Congress during the Carter administration (1977-1981). The Reagan administration (1981-1989) invaded Grenada, bombed Libya, and conducted an air campaign against Iran, all without congressional approval. The same was true of the use of force in the Philippines, Panama, and El Salvador. To regain control over matters of war and peace, Congress approved the War Powers Resolution (WPR) in 1973 which necessitated a "collective judgment" before sending American forces into battle. Even though WPR was passed over President Nixon's veto, Goodman, an expert in national security and intelligence, believes that the subsequent administrations have refused to uphold the resolution. He adds that the influence of the State Department has declined over time while Pentagon's role has increased, as reflected in their budgets.

== Criticism ==
Since the 9/11 attacks in 2001, the US has waged war in Iraq and Afghanistan and employed military force in Pakistan, Libya, Somalia, and Yemen within its war on terror. The historian Andrew Bacevich observes that "today as never before in their history Americans are enthralled with military power," which, in his view, endangers US security at home and "wreaks havoc abroad." Similarly, Goodman suggests that the US dependence on its military hurts US national interests at a time when the entire globe is experiencing extreme economic duress. To support his view, Goodman notes that the US has provided significant military aid to military governments in Brazil, Chile, Indonesia, Pakistan, the Philippines, South Korea, and Libya over the past several decades. These governments eventually had to undergo reforms or cede control to a civilian administration. The wars in Iraq and Afghanistan have also placed a heavy financial burden on the US without increasing its security. These wars instead heightened regional tensions and destabilized both countries.

== See also ==
- Timeline of United States military operations
- List of United States military bases
- List of United States drone bases
- Lists of wars involving the United States
- United States military deployments
- Military history of the United States
- Military budget of the United States
- United States Foreign Military Financing
- United States military aid
