= Kirkpatrick Doctrine =

Principle in 1980s U.S. foreign policy

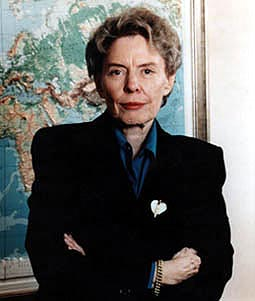
Jeane Kirkpatrick

The Kirkpatrick Doctrine was a foreign policy doctrine expounded by United States ambassador to the United Nations Jeane Kirkpatrick in the early 1980s based on her 1979 essay, "Dictatorships and Double Standards". The doctrine was used to justify U.S. foreign policy of supporting Third World anti-communist dictatorships during the Cold War.

== Doctrine ==
Kirkpatrick claimed that states in the Soviet bloc and other communist states were totalitarian regimes, while pro-Western dictatorships were merely "authoritarian" ones. According to Kirkpatrick, totalitarian regimes were more stable and self-perpetuating than authoritarian regimes, and thus had a greater propensity to influence neighboring states.

The Kirkpatrick Doctrine was particularly influential during the administration of President Ronald Reagan. The Reagan administration gave varying degrees of support to several militaristic anti-communist dictatorships, including those in Guatemala (to 1985), the Philippines (to 1986), and Argentina (to 1983), and armed the Afghan mujahideen in the Soviet–Afghan War, UNITA during the Angolan Civil War, and the Contras during the Nicaraguan Revolution as a means of toppling governments, or crushing revolutionary movements, in those countries that did not support the aims of the U.S.

According to Kirkpatrick, authoritarian regimes merely try to control and/or punish their subjects' behaviors, while totalitarian regimes move beyond that into attempting to control the thoughts of their subjects, using not only propaganda, but brainwashing, re-education, widespread domestic espionage, and mass political repression based on state ideology. Totalitarian regimes also often attempt to undermine or destroy community institutions deemed ideologically tainted (e.g., religious ones, or even the nuclear family), while authoritarian regimes by and large leave these alone. For this reason, she argued that the process of restoring democracy is easier in formerly authoritarian than in formerly totalitarian states, and that authoritarian states are more amenable to gradual reform in a democratic direction than are totalitarian states.

== Criticism ==
Kirkpatrick's tenet that totalitarian regimes are more stable than authoritarian regimes has come under criticism since the collapse of the Soviet Union in 1991, particularly as Kirkpatrick predicted that the Soviet system would persist for decades.

Ted Galen Carpenter of the Cato Institute has also disputed the doctrine, noting that while communist movements tend to depose rival authoritarians, the traditional authoritarian regimes supported by the U.S. came to power by overthrowing democracies. He thus concludes that while communist regimes are more difficult to eradicate, traditional autocratic regimes "pose the more lethal threat to functioning democracies."

== See also ==
- Big stick ideology
- Reagan Doctrine
- Realpolitik
- Rollback
- The Heritage Foundation
