= Flight 222 (film) =

Flight 222 (Рейс 222)
- Original film poster
- Directed by: Sergei Mikaelyan
- Written by: Sergei Mikaelyan
- Starring: Larisa Polyakova; Nikolai Kochnev; Aleksandr Kolesnikov
- Cinematography: Sergey Astakhov
- Music by: Sergei Banevich
- Production company: Lenfilm
- Release date: 1985
- Running time: 130 minutes
- Country: Soviet Union
- Language: Russian

Flight 222 (Russian: Рейс 222, romanized: Reis 222) is a 1985 Soviet docu-drama film directed by Sergei Mikaelyan. It is loosely based about the incidents during the defection of ballet dancer Alexander Godunov in 1979.

== Plot ==
The film is set in New York City, based on the incident during defection of Alexander Godunov. Irina (Larisa Polyakova) is a part of a Soviet ice dancing tour on a visit to New York along with her husband. When Soviet authorities hear about her husband's defection, they put her on a plane to Moscow. However, U.S. Immigration Service stop the flight insisting that she is being taken out of the United States against her will. Irina's plane to Moscow awaits permission for take-off until a meeting is arranged with her husband at the airport.

== Cast ==
- Larisa Polyakova as Irina Panina, skater
- Yury Schadrin as Ivan K., aircraft commander
- Vilnis Bekeris as Michael Drake, employee of the US State Department
- Valentin Bukin as Fedor, Head of Glaucus
- Aivars Siliņš (lv) as Forrest, an employee of the US State Department
