= Jeane Kirkpatrick =

American diplomat and presidential advisor (1926–2006)

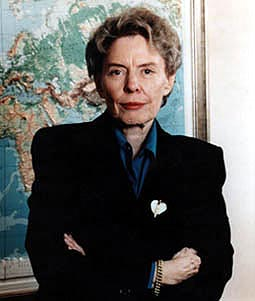
- Official portrait, 1981

16th United States Ambassador to the United Nations
- In office February 4, 1981 – April 1, 1985
- President: Ronald Reagan
- Preceded by: Donald McHenry
- Succeeded by: Vernon Walters

Personal details
- Born: Jeane Duane Jordan; November 19, 1926 Duncan, Oklahoma, U.S.
- Died: December 7, 2006 (aged 80) Bethesda, Maryland, U.S.
- Party: Socialist (1945–1948); Democratic (1948–1985); Republican (1985–2006)
- Spouse: Evron Kirkpatrick
- Children: 3
- Education: Stephens College (AA); Columbia University (BA, MA, PhD)

Jeane Duane Kirkpatrick (née Jordan; November 19, 1926 – December 7, 2006) was an American diplomat and political scientist who played a major role in the foreign policy of the Ronald Reagan administration. An ardent anti-communist, she was a longtime Democrat who became a neoconservative and switched to the Republican Party in 1985. After serving as Ronald Reagan's foreign policy adviser in his 1980 presidential campaign, she became the first woman to serve as United States Ambassador to the United Nations.

She was known for the "Kirkpatrick Doctrine", which advocated supporting authoritarian regimes around the world if they went along with Washington's aims. She wrote, "traditional authoritarian governments are less repressive than revolutionary autocracies." She sympathized with the Argentine junta during the Falklands War, while Reagan took the other side in support of British prime minister Margaret Thatcher.

Kirkpatrick served in Reagan's cabinet on the National Security Council, Foreign Intelligence Advisory Board, Defense Policy Review Board, and chaired the Secretary of Defense Commission on Fail Safe and Risk Reduction of the Nuclear Command and Control System. She wrote a syndicated newspaper column after leaving government service in 1985, specializing in analysis of United Nations activities.

== Early life and education ==
Kirkpatrick was born in Duncan, Oklahoma, on November 19, 1926, the daughter of an oilfield wildcatter, Welcher F. Jordan, and his wife, Leona (née Kile). She attended Emerson Elementary School in Duncan, and was known to her classmates as "Duane Jordan". She had a younger sibling, Jerry. At 12, her father moved the family to Mt. Vernon, Illinois, where she graduated from Mt. Vernon Township High School. In 1948, she graduated from Barnard College after receiving her associate degree from Stephens College in Columbia, Missouri, which was then only a two-year institution.

Kirkpatrick earned a master's degree and later a Ph.D. in political science from Columbia University. She spent a year of postgraduate study at Sciences Po at the University of Paris, which helped her learn French. She was fluent in Spanish. As a college freshman in 1945, Kirkpatrick joined the Young People's Socialist League, a wing of the Socialist Party of America, influenced by her grandfather who was a founder of the Populist and Socialist parties in Oklahoma. At Columbia University, her principal adviser was Franz Leopold Neumann, a revisionist Marxist. As Kirkpatrick recalled at a symposium in 2002:

It wasn't easy to find the YPSL in Columbia, Missouri. But I had read about it and I wanted to be one. We had a very limited number of activities in Columbia, Missouri. We had an anti-Franco rally, which was a worthy cause. You could raise a question about how relevant it was likely to be in Columbia, Missouri, but it was in any case a worthy cause. We also planned a socialist picnic, which we spent quite a lot of time organizing. Eventually, I regret to say, the YPSL chapter, after much discussion, many debates and some downright quarrels, broke up over the socialist picnic. I thought that was rather discouraging.

== Career ==
=== Georgetown University ===
In 1967, she joined the faculty of Georgetown University and became a full professor of government in 1973. She became active in politics as a Democrat in the 1970s, and was involved in the later campaigns of former vice president and Democratic presidential candidate Hubert Humphrey. In addition to Humphrey, she was close to Henry Jackson, who ran for the Democratic nomination for president in 1972 and 1976. Like many in Jackson's circle she became identified with neoconservatism. Opposed to the candidacy of George McGovern in 1972, she joined with Richard V. Allen and others in co-founding the Committee on the Present Danger, which sought to warn Americans of Soviet Union's growing military power and the dangers that the organization believe were represented to the United States in the SALT II treaty. She also served on the Platform Committee for the Democratic Party in 1976.

Kirkpatrick published articles in political science journals reflecting her disillusionment with the Democratic Party with specific criticism of the foreign policy of Democratic president Jimmy Carter. Her most well known essay, "Dictatorships and Double Standards", was published in Commentary magazine in November 1979. In the essay, Kirkpatrick mentioned what she saw as a difference between authoritarian regimes and the totalitarian regimes such as the Soviet Union; sometimes, it was necessary to work with authoritarian regimes if it suited American purposes. She wrote: "No idea holds greater sway in the mind of educated Americans than the belief that it is possible to democratize governments, anytime and anywhere, under any circumstances ... Decades, if not centuries, are normally required for people to acquire the necessary disciplines and habits. In Britain, the road [to democratic government] took seven centuries to traverse ... The speed with which armies collapse, bureaucracies abdicate, and social structures dissolve once the autocrat is removed frequently surprises American policymakers."

== Cabinet ==
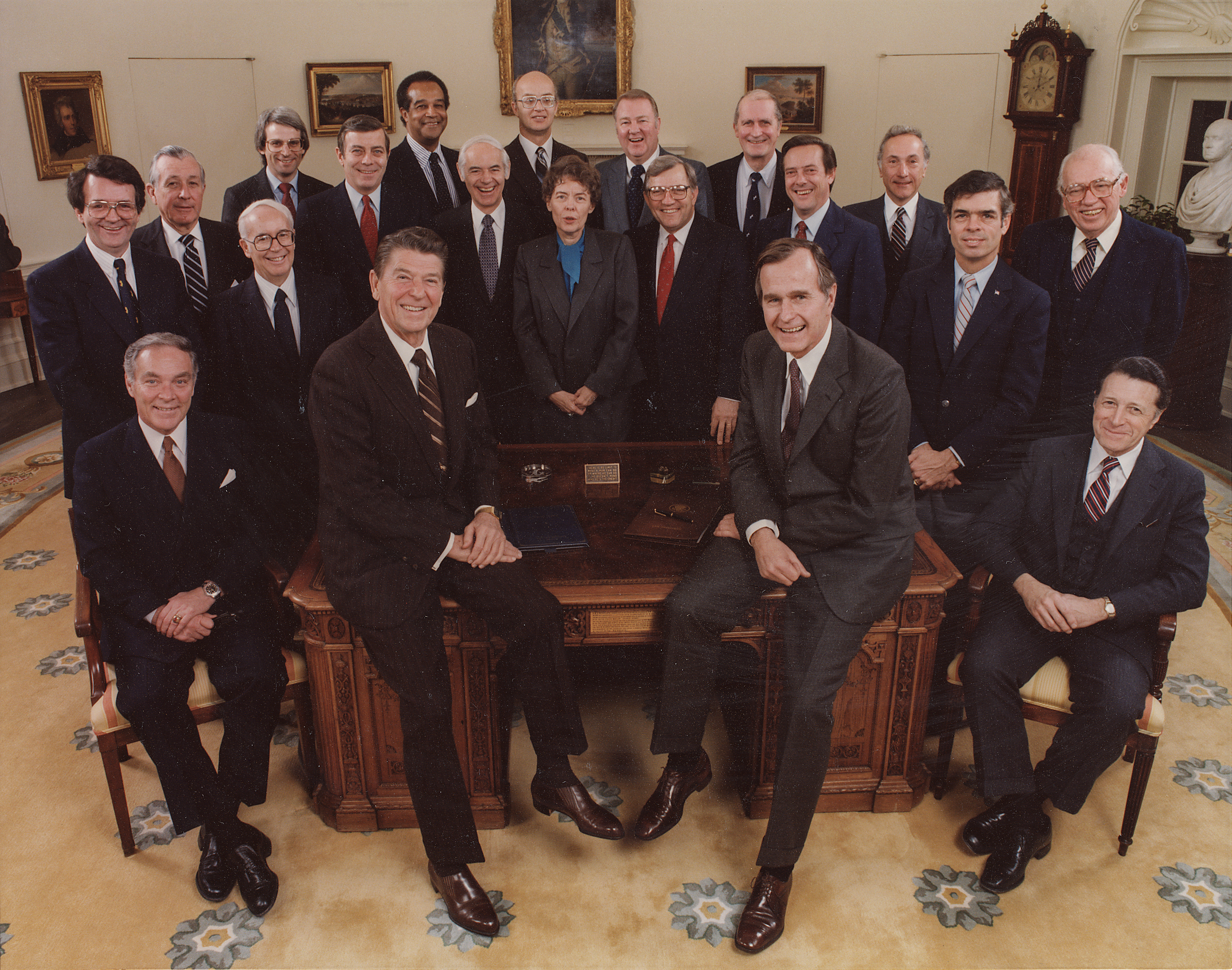
Kirkpatrick (center) with the other members of the Reagan Administration, 1981

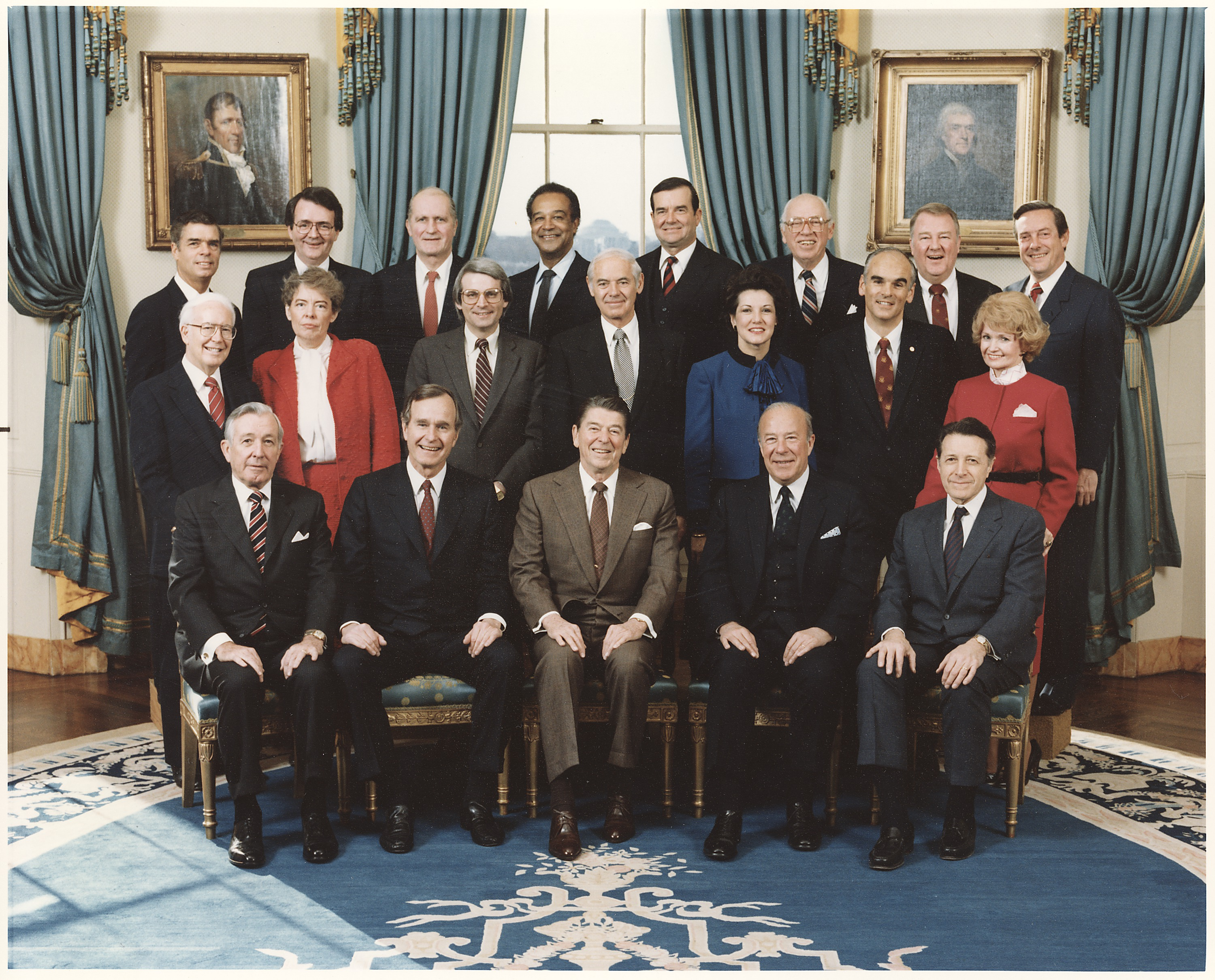
Kirkpatrick (left, in red) among the Reagan Cabinet, 1984

The piece came to the attention of Ronald Reagan through his National Security Adviser Richard V. Allen. Kirkpatrick then became a foreign policy adviser throughout Reagan's 1980 campaign and presidency and, after his election to the presidency, Ambassador to the United Nations, which she held for four years. The Economist writes that until then, "she had never spent time with a Republican before."

On the way to her first meeting with Reagan, she told Allen, "Listen, Dick, I am an AFL–CIO Democrat and I am quite concerned that my meeting Ronald Reagan on any basis will be misunderstood." She asked Reagan if he minded having a lifelong Democrat on his team; he replied that he himself had been a Democrat until he was 51, and in any event, he liked her way of thinking about American foreign policy.

Kirkpatrick was a vocal advocate of US support for the military regime in El Salvador during the early years of the Reagan Administration. When four US churchwomen were murdered by Salvadorean soldiers in 1980, Kirkpatrick declared her 'unequivocal' belief that the Salvadorean army was not responsible, adding that 'the nuns were not just nuns. They were political activists. We ought to be a little more clear about this than we actually are.' After the release of declassified documents in the 1990s, New Jersey congressman Robert Torricelli stated that it was 'now clear that while the Reagan Administration was certifying human rights progress in El Salvador they knew the terrible truth that the Salvadoran military was engaged in a widespread campaign of terror and torture'.

She was one of the strongest supporters of Argentina's military dictatorship following the March 1982 Argentine invasion of the United Kingdom's Falkland Islands, which triggered the Falklands War. Kirkpatrick had a "soft spot" for Argentina's General Leopoldo Galtieri and favored neutrality rather than the pro-British policy favored by Secretary of State Alexander Haig. Kirkpatrick, who, according to British UN Ambassador Sir Anthony Parsons, was very mixed up with Latin American policy, even went as far as supporting the Argentinian dictatorship by urging the Reagan Administration to act as outlined as in the Rio Pact of 1947, which stated that an attack against one state in the hemisphere should be considered an attack against them all.

British ambassador Sir Nicholas Henderson allegedly characterized her in a diplomatic cable as "more fool than fascist ... she appears to be one of America's own-goal scorers, tactless, wrong-headed, ineffective, and a dubious tribute to the academic profession to which she [expresses] her allegiance." The Reagan administration ultimately decided to declare support for the British, making her vote for United Nations Security Council Resolution 502.

At the 1984 Republican National Convention, she delivered the "Blame America First" keynote speech, which renominated Reagan by praising his administration's foreign policy while excoriating the leadership of what she called the "San Francisco Democrats" (the Democrats had just held their convention in San Francisco) for the party's shift away from the policies of Harry S. Truman and John F. Kennedy to a more strident antiwar position for which the left wing of the Democratic Party had pushed since the Vietnam War. It was the first time since the 1952 speech from Douglas MacArthur that a non-party member had delivered the Republican Convention's keynote address.

Kirkpatrick, a member of the National Security Council, did not get along with either Secretary of State Haig or his successor, George Shultz. She disagreed with Shultz, most notably on the Iran–Contra affair in which she supported skimming money off arms sales to fund the Nicaraguan Contras while Shultz told Kirkpatrick that it would be an "impeachable offense" to do so because of the massacres perpetrated by that group. Shultz threatened to resign if Kirkpatrick was appointed National Security Adviser. Kirkpatrick was more closely allied with Secretary of Defense Caspar Weinberger and head of the CIA William J. Casey on the issue.

Noam Chomsky referred to Kirkpatrick as the "Chief sadist-in-residence of the Reagan Administration" and went on to criticize what he called the hypocrisy of supporting brutal military regimes that showed no respect for human rights or democracy while claiming to be protecting the region from Soviet-style Communism. Author Lars Schoultz argued that her policy was based on her belief that "Latin Americans are pathologically violent" and goes on to criticize that as a prejudice with no factual basis.

== Ambassador to the United Nations ==
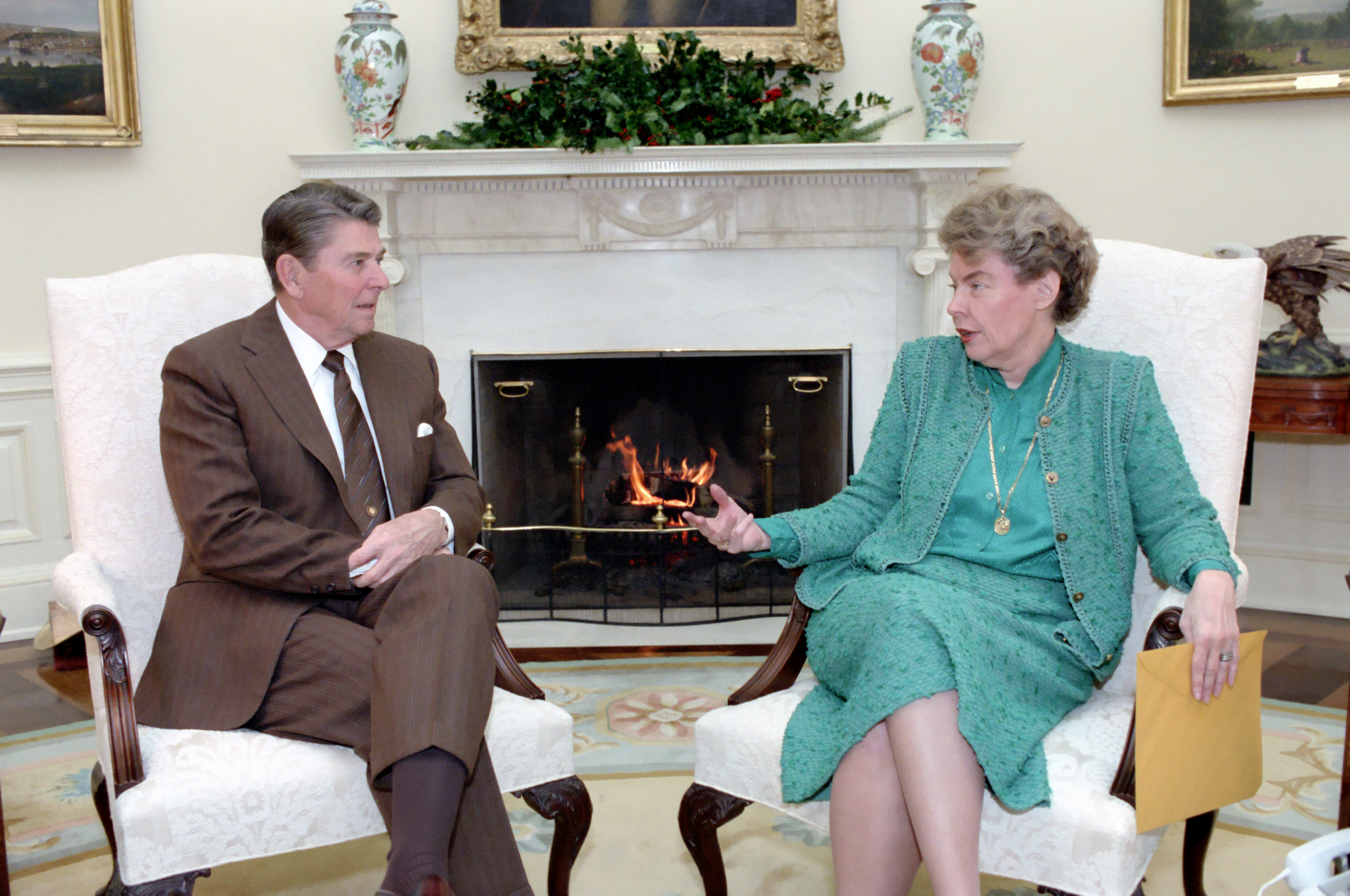
Kirkpatrick with President Ronald Reagan in the Oval Office

Kirkpatrick said, "What takes place in the Security Council more closely resembles a mugging than either a political debate or an effort at problem-solving." Still, she finished her term with a certain respect for the normative power of the United Nations as the "institution whose majorities claim the right to decide—for the world—what is legitimate and what is illegitimate." She noted that the United States had increasingly ignored that significance and became increasingly isolated. That was problematic because in her view "relative isolation in a body like the United Nations is a sign of impotence", especially given its ability to shape international attitudes. She was ambassador to the UN during the September 1, 1983, Soviet shooting down of Korean Air Lines Flight 007, near Moneron Island. It had carried 269 passengers and crew including a sitting congressman, Larry McDonald (D-GA). She played before the Security Council the audio of the electronic intercept of the interceptor pilot during the attack, and the Soviet Union could no longer deny its responsibility for the shootdown.

Kirkpatrick was a board member of the American Foundation for Resistance International and the National Council to Support the Democracy Movements, intended to help bring down Soviet and East European Communism. Along with Vladimir Bukovsky, Martin Colman and Richard Perle, she worked to organize democratic revolutions against Communism. According to Jay Nordlinger, on a visit with American dignitaries, Soviet human rights activist Andrei Sakharov said, "Kirkpatski, Kirkpatski, which of you is Kirkpatski?" When others pointed to Kirkpatrick, he said, "Your name is known in every cell in the Gulag" because she had named Soviet political prisoners on the floor of the UN. Kirkpatrick had said she would serve only one term at the UN and stepped down in April 1985.

=== Views on Israel ===
Kirkpatrick was a staunch supporter of Israel. During her ambassadorship at the United Nations, she considered its frequent criticism and condemnation of the Jewish state as holding Israel to a double standard, which she attributed to hostility and regarded as politically motivated. In 1989, Mohammed Wahby, press director of Egypt's Information Bureau, wrote to the Washington Post, "Jeane Kirkpatrick has, somehow, consistently opposed any attempt to resolve the Arab–Israeli conflict". In a 1989 op-ed, Kirkpatrick warned Secretary of State James Baker and Bush not to get involved in the conflict because any intervention would fail.

Kirkpatrick frequently expressed disdain for what she perceived to be disproportionate attention towards Israel's at the expense of others' conflicts. Despite this, during her tenure as UN Ambassador, she supported several resolutions condemning Israel. Anti-Defamation League President Abraham Foxman issued a press release upon her death: "She will be fondly remembered for her unwavering and valiant support of the State of Israel and her unequivocal opposition to anti-Semitism, especially during her tenure at the United Nations. She was always a true friend of the Jewish people."

== Political views ==
Comparing authoritarian and totalitarian regimes, she said:

- "Authoritarian regimes really typically don't have complete command economies. Authoritarian regimes typically have some kind of traditional economy with some private ownership. The Nazi regime left ownership in private hands, but the state assumed control of the economy. Control was separated from ownership but it was really a command economy because it was controlled by the state. A command economy is an attribute of a totalitarian state."

Explaining her disillusionment with international organizations, especially the United Nations, she stated:

- "As I watched the behavior of the nations of the U.N. (including our own), I found no reasonable ground to expect any one of those governments to transcend permanently their own national interests for those of another country."
- "I conclude that it is a fundamental mistake to think that salvation, justice, or virtue come through merely human institutions."
- "Democracy not only requires equality but also an unshakable conviction in the value of each person, who is then equal. Cross cultural experience teaches us not simply that people have different beliefs, but that people seek meaning and understand themselves in some sense as members of a cosmos ruled by God."

Regarding socialism, she said:

- "As I read the utopian socialists, the scientific socialists, the German Social Democrats and revolutionary socialists—whatever I could in either English or French—I came to the conclusion that almost all of them, including my grandfather, were engaged in an effort to change human nature. The more I thought about it, the more I thought this was not likely to be a successful effort. So I turned my attention more and more to political philosophy and less and less to socialist activism of any kind."

== Later life ==
In April 1985, Kirkpatrick became a Republican, a move which The Economist called her "only recourse" after her speech at the 1984 Republican National Convention. She returned to teaching at Georgetown University and became a fellow at the American Enterprise Institute, a think tank in Washington D.C., and a contributor to the American Freedom Journal. In 1993, she cofounded Empower America, a public-policy organization. She was also on the advisory board of the National Association of Scholars, a group that works against what it regards as a liberal bias in universities in the United States, with its emphasis on multicultural education, and affirmative action.

Kirkpatrick briefly considered running for president in 1988 against George H. W. Bush, because she believed he was not tough enough on Communism. Kirkpatrick endorsed Senator Bob Dole of Kansas, who was the runner-up to Bush. Despite a strong showing in the Iowa caucuses, Dole's campaign quickly faded after he lost the New Hampshire primary in February 1988. Kirkpatrick was an active surrogate campaigner for Dole even as he was losing, as was her old foe, Alexander Haig, who endorsed Dole after ending his own 1988 campaign several days before the New Hampshire primary.

Along with Empower America co-directors William Bennett and Jack Kemp, she called on the Congress to issue a formal declaration of war against the "entire fundamentalist Islamist terrorist network" the day after the September 11 attacks on the World Trade Center. In 2003, she headed the US delegation to the United Nations Commission on Human Rights. Kirkpatrick was appointed to the Board of Directors of IDT Corp. in 2004. It was revealed after her death that in 2003, she was sent as a US envoy, to meet an Arab delegation and attempt to convince them to support the Iraq War; she was supposed to argue that pre-emptive war was justifiable, but she knew that it would not work and instead argued that Saddam Hussein had consistently gone against the UN. However, she described George W. Bush as "a bit too interventionist for my taste" and felt that what she described as "moral imperialism" was not "taken seriously anywhere outside a few places in Washington, D.C."

== Personal life ==
According to a spokesperson at the American Enterprise Institute, Kirkpatrick was a Presbyterian. On February 20, 1955, she married Evron Maurice Kirkpatrick, who was a scholar and a former member of the O.S.S. (the World War II–era predecessor of the CIA). Her husband died in 1995. They had three sons: Douglas Jordan (1956–2006), John Evron, and Stuart Alan. After being diagnosed with heart disease and in failing health for several years, Kirkpatrick died at her home in Bethesda, Maryland, on December 7, 2006, from congestive heart failure. She was interred at Parklawn Memorial Park in Rockville, Maryland.

== Awards and prizes ==
In 1985, Kirkpatrick was awarded the Presidential Medal of Freedom, the nation's highest civilian honor. Harvard Kennedy School created a Kirkpatrick Chair in International Affairs in her honor. She was given the Simon Wiesenthal Center's Humanitarian Award in 1983. She received an honorary doctorate degree from Universidad Francisco Marroquín in 1985; she also received an honorary doctorate at Central Connecticut State University in 1991 and delivered the Robert C. Vance Lecture.

Kirkpatrick was awarded an honorary degree by Brandeis University in 1994, but declined it when her honor was met with protests from some professors and students, whom she described as "ideological zealots". Fifty-three professors opposed the award, with one stating: "We oppose the degree because she was the intellectual architect of Reagan administration policies that supported some of the Latin-American regimes with the most repressive records."

In 1995, Kirkpatrick received from The Fund for American Studies the Walter Judd Freedom Award. In 2007, the Conservative Political Action Conference (CPAC) honored her with the creation of the Jeane Kirkpatrick Academic Freedom Award. The first recipient was Marine Corps reservist and correspondent Matt Sanchez. Kirkpatrick was inducted into the Oklahoma Women's Hall of Fame in 1984.

== In popular culture ==
Kirkpatrick was portrayed by Lorelei King in the 2002 BBC production of Ian Curteis's The Falklands Play. Comedic actress Nora Dunn portrayed Jean on a 1987 episode of Saturday Night Live hosted by Steve Martin as a contestant on a game show called "Common Knowledge". In the season eight opener of ‘’Murphy Brown’’ in 1995, Phil tells Murphy there’s someone in his bar’s storeroom she should talk to. Murphy says, “The last time you wanted me to talk to someone in the storeroom I ended up getting cold cocked by Jeane Kirkpatrick.” Phil replies, “I was as surprised as you were! Who knew the woman could hoist a keg over her head like that?!” In Berkeley Breathed's daily comic strip Bloom County, Kirkpatrick becomes former Meadow Party Presidential candidate Bill the Cat's love interest before he is exposed as using that relationship to perform espionage for the Soviet Union.

== Books authored ==
- Making War to Keep Peace, 2007 (ISBN 0-06-119543-X)
- The Withering Away of the Totalitarian State...and Other Surprises, 1992 (ISBN 0-8447-3728-3)
- Legitimacy and Force: National and International Dimensions, 1988 (ISBN 0-88738-647-4)
- International Regulation: New Rules in a Changing World Order, 1988 (ISBN 1-55815-026-9)
- Legitimacy and Force: Political and Moral Dimensions, 1988 (ISBN 0-88738-099-9)
- Legitimacy and Force: State Papers and Current Perspectives 1981–1985, 1987 (ISBN 0-88738-647-4)
- The United States and the World: Setting Limits, 1986 (ISBN 0-8447-1379-1)
- The Reagan Doctrine and U.S. Foreign Policy, 1985 (ISBN 99965-0-591-X)
- Reagan Phenomenon and Other Speeches on Foreign Policy, 1983 (ISBN 0-8447-1361-9)
- U.N. Under Scrutiny, 1982 (ISBN 99938-872-9-3)
- Dictatorships and Double Standards: Rationalism and Reason in Politics, 1982 (ISBN 0-671-43836-0)
- Presidential Nominating Process: Can It Be Improved, 1980 (ISBN 0-8447-3397-0)
- Dismantling the Parties: Reflections on Party Reform and Party Decomposition, 1978 (ISBN 0-8447-3293-1)
- The New Presidential Elite: Men and Women in National Politics, 1976 (ISBN 0-87154-475-X)
- Political Woman, 1974 (ISBN 0-465-05970-8), the first major study of women in American political life. It includes interviews with 50 successful political women, representing 26 states.

Kirkpatrick was editor of a 1963 book titled The Strategy of Deception: A Study in World-Wide Communist Tactics.

== See also ==
- List of notable Presidential Medal of Freedom recipients
- List of U.S. political appointments that crossed party lines

Diplomatic posts
Preceded by Donald McHenry	United States Ambassadors to the United Nations; 1981–1985	Succeeded by Vernon Walters
