= Aegean Sea anti-piracy operations of the United States =

Anti-piracy operations conducted by the United States in the Aegean Sea

Aegean Sea anti-piracy operations
- Part of the Greek War of Independence
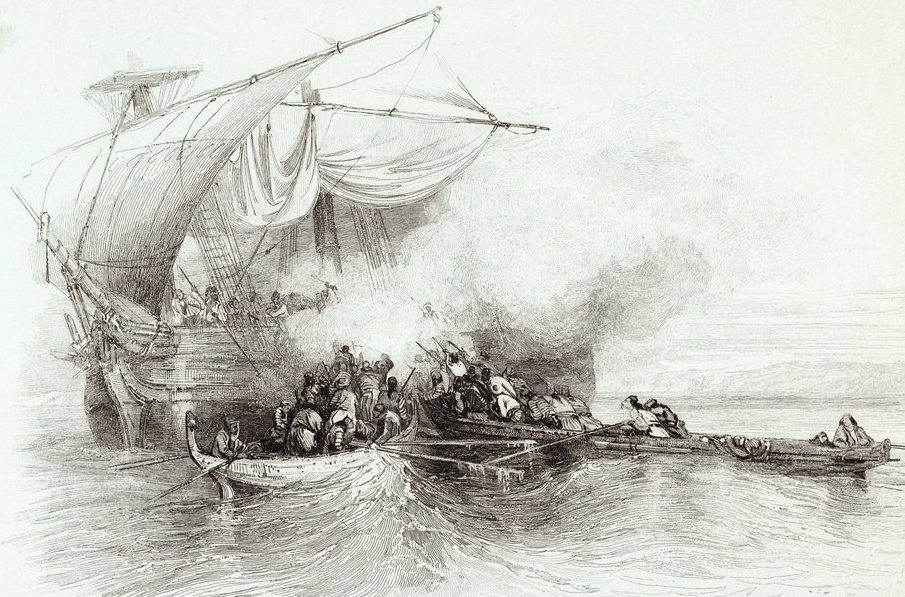
- Pirates grecs (1838), by Alexandre-Gabriel Decamps
| Date | May 1825 – December 1828 |
| Location | Aegean Sea |
| Result | Operational success |

Belligerents
| United States | Pirates |

Commanders and leaders
| John Rodgers; Lawrence Kearny; Louis M. Goldsborough; William L. Hudson | Unknown |

Strength
| 1 ship-of-the-line; 1 frigate; 3 sloops-of-war; 2 schooners | Unknown |

Casualties and losses
| Unknown | Unknown |

Aegean Sea anti-piracy operations began in 1825 when the United States government dispatched a squadron of ships to suppress Greek piracy in the Aegean Sea. The Greek civil wars of 1824–1825 and the decline of the Hellenic Navy made the Aegean quickly become a haven for pirates who sometimes doubled as privateers.

American merchant vessels were attacked and so the Mediterranean Squadron began escort and patrol duties. The operations terminated in 1828, as piracy ceased.

== Background ==
The Hellenic Navy declined after 1824 and turned increasingly to privateering. With the breakdown of law and order in the Aegean, piracy became widespread. On May 29, 1825, an American vessel from Boston was seized by privateers. That year, the Secretary of the Navy dispatched Commodore John Rodgers to protect American commerce.

From 1825 to 1828, seven American warships were assigned to the Mediterranean Squadron, including the flagship USS North Carolina, the frigate USS Constitution, the sloops USS Fairfield, USS Lexington and USS Ontario, and the schooners USS Porpoise and USS Warren. The sloops and the schooners were the main vessels deployed against the pirates because the larger men-of-war were too large to be effective. Many of the Greek pirates used small, three-masted vessels called mistikos and were usually armed with one bow gun.

== Operations ==
Commodore John Rodgers's first squadron in the Aegean occupied its time by convoying merchant ships and did not fight any engagements. In 1826, the squadron was withdrawn, but another was sent in 1827 after a new escalation in piracy. Again the naval force was under Rodgers' command. USS Warren would be the first to fight the brigands in a battle; she was newly constructed and sailed from Boston in February 1827. In September, the Warren ceased escort duty, and under the command of Lieutenant Lawrence Kearny, she captured a sixteen-gun brig on October 4 while she was patrolling around Cape Matapan and the port of Carabusa. One boat and 15 pirates were also taken.

Sailing in convoy on October 16, Lieutenant Louis M. Goldsborough of the USS Porpoise liberated the British brig Comet after watching it get captured by 250 pirates in five vessels. In the ensuing battle of Doro Passage, around 90 brigands were killed or wounded, but the Americans suffered no casualties. Three brigs left the convoy at that point and two of them were later attacked. The first brig was captured off Chios and the second was abandoned by her crew before it was captured.

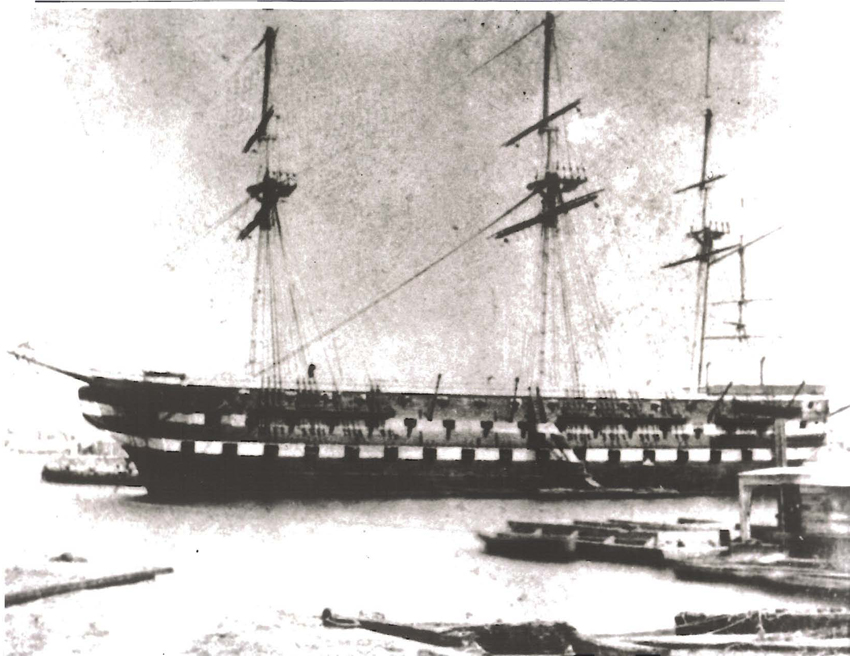
USS North Carolina

On October 23, one American sailor from the Porpoise was wounded in a skirmish near Andros. USS Warren chased a ten-gun pirate brig on October 25, and it grounded off Argentiere before sinking; the pirates escaped to shore. Warren recovered the American ship Cherub and the Austrian vessel Silence off Syros on October 28, and two days later the Americans captured a pirate tratta propelled by forty oars and landed sailors and marines on Mykonos to recover stolen property from the Cherub, Silence and the Rob Roy. One pirate boat was burned during the landing and the town shelled.

On November 7, a boat expedition from the Warren under the command of Lieutenant William L. Hudson destroyed one pirate boat and captured another off Andros. The Warren also landed men on Argentiere and Milos in December, and convoyed eight American merchant vessels from Milos to Smyrna. In just over two months, the Warren captured or destroyed seven pirate vessels, rescued three merchant ships, recovered stolen property, escorted two convoys, and patrolled hundreds of miles in the Mediterranean. By the end of 1827, the United Kingdom, Russia, and France had deployed their own fleets to the Aegean for suppression of piracy and to support Greek independence from the Ottoman Empire.

In January 1828, a combined fleet of British and French warships attacked Carabusa, which was a major center of piracy. Following its destruction, reports of pirate attacks began to cease, and by the end of 1828, Secretary of the Navy Samuel L. Southard declared that because of the convoy system enforced by the United States Navy and the arrival of powerful fleets in the Aegean, the threat of piracy was eliminated.

== See also ==
- West Indies anti-piracy operations of the United States
