= Benjamin F. B. Hunter =

United States Navy official (1821–1884)

Benjamin Fitz-Bourne Hunter
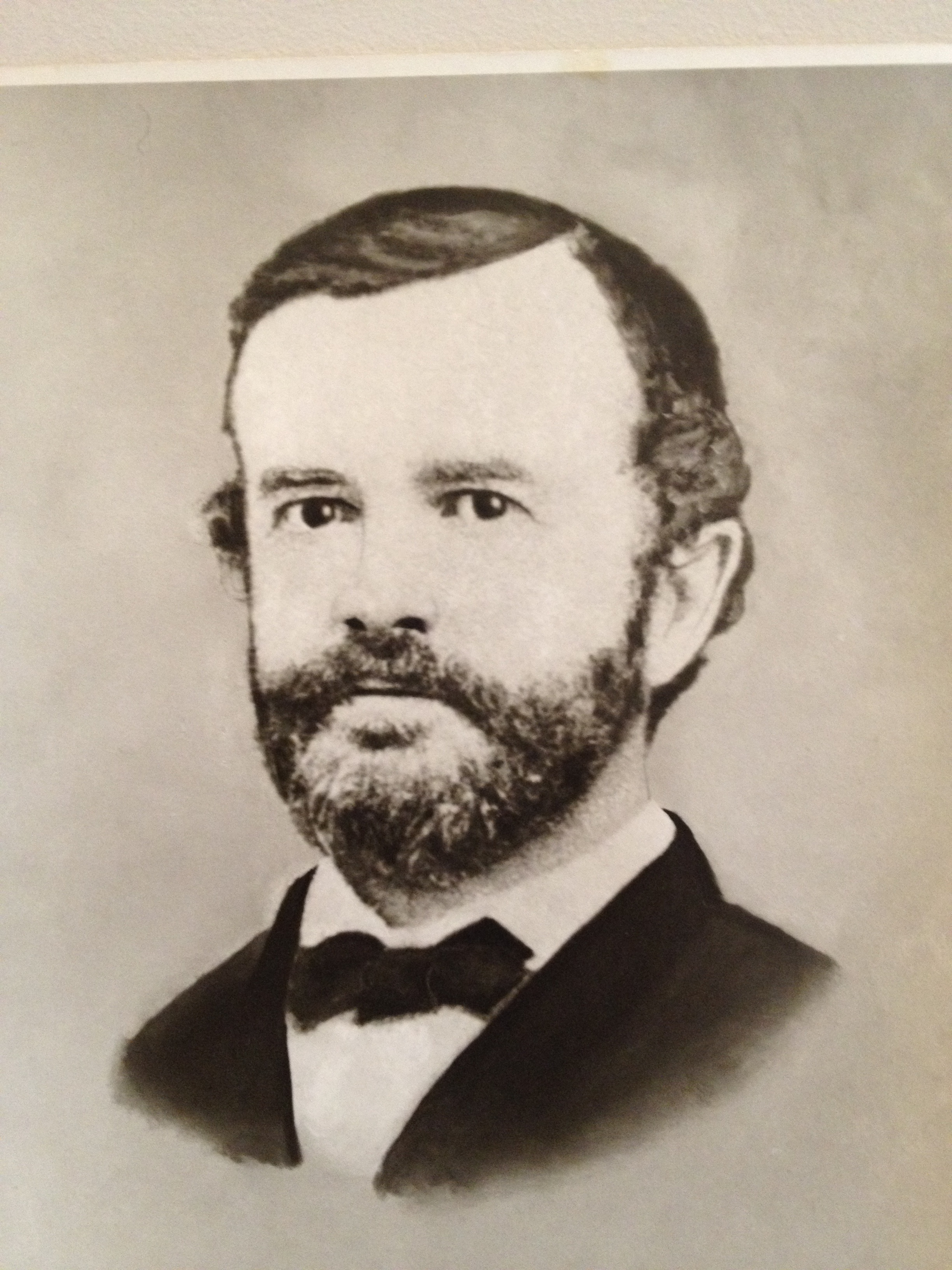
- Benjamin Fitz-Bourne Hunter
- Born: November 11, 1821; Pittsburgh, Pennsylvania, US
- Died: April 9, 1884 (aged 62); Bay St. Louis, Mississippi, US
- Burial place: Natchez, Mississippi, US
- Military career
- Allegiance: United States
- Branch: United States Navy
- Service years: 1835-1851
- Rank: Lieutenant
- Commands: USS Warren; USS Constitution; USS James Madison; USS Phoenix; USS Wave; USS Onkahye; USS Somers; USS Cyane; USS Portsmouth; USS Marion
- Conflicts: Mexican–American War: Los Angeles campaign; San Jose, Mexico landing party

Lieutenant Benjamin Fitz-Bourne Hunter, USN (Ret.), was a sailor and officer of the United States Sailing Navy. Born November 11, 1821, in Pittsburgh, Pennsylvania, he held positions of increasing responsibility and commanded many groups of sailors. He died April 9, 1884, age 62, in Bay St. Louis, Mississippi, and was buried in Natchez, Mississippi.

== Naval service ==
Benjamin F.B. Hunter was a lieutenant in the United States Navy, honorably retired in 1851. He entered naval service in 1835 at the age of 14 and served two years "before the mast" on the USS Warren and resigned in 1837. Hunter reentered service in 1839, was the sailing master of the USS Portsmouth, led an expedition to resupply Captain John Fremont during the War with Mexico and later led land forces during the Mexican–American War campaign for Los Angeles. He also led a 140-man landing party ashore in San Jose, Mexico, where the American flag was raised with no resistance.

Contained below are excerpts from official orders and correspondence as published.

From the National Archives, Naval Officer Records (dates are as written in the official log):

"No. 2134
10th April 1839, Reappointed Ben F.B. Hunter
20th Aug 1835. August 20th 1835 appointed5. Nov. 12th to the Warren 547. Oct. 10th 37 Resign. accepted 31, March 22 39 Reinstated and hold in readiness for active service 173. March 28th 39 to the Constitution (at Norfolk) April 11th to the Constitution at N.Y. 189."

- August 20, 1835: Benjamin F.B. Hunter, Esq. of the State of Georgia appointed an acting Midshipman.

"Navy Department
20th August, 1835
Sir,
You are hereby appointed an Acting Midshipman in the Navy of the United States, and if your commanding officer shall after 6 months of actual service at sea, report favorably of your character, talents and qualifications, a Warrant will be given to you, bearing the date of this letter.
I enclose a description of the uniform and the required oath: the latter, when taken and subscribed, you will transmit to this Department, with your letter of acceptance, in which you will state your age, and place of nativity.
Your pay will not commence until you shall receive orders for service at sea.
I am, respectfully
M. Dickerson

Ben F.B. Hunter, Esq.
of the State of Georgia
Washington"

- November 12, 1835: Assigned to USS Warren.
- October 10, 1837: Resigned, accepted October 31, 1837.
- March 22, 1839: Reinstated and hold in readiness for active service.
- March 28, 1839: To the USS Constitution at Norfolk.
- April 10, 1839: Received Warrant, reappointed as a Midshipman from the 20th day of August 1835.

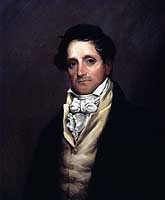
J K Paulding Secretary of the Navy 1838-1841

"Navy Department
Martin Van Buren
PRESIDENT of the UNITED STATES of AMERICA
TO ALL WHO SHALL SEE THESE PRESENTS GREETING:
Know YE, That reporting special trust and confidence in the Patriotism, Valor, Fidelity and Abilities of BEN F. B. HUNTER I do appoint him a Midshipman in the NAVY OF THE UNITED STATES, from the 20th of August, 1835.
HE IS, THEREFORE, carefully and diligently to discharge all duties of a Midshipman. I do strictly charge and require all Officers, seamen and others under his command, to be obedient to his orders.
AND he is to obey the orders and directions which he shall receive from the PRESIDENT of the UNITED STATES or his superior Officer according to the Rules and Discipline of the NAVY. THIS WARRANT is to continue in force during the pleasure of the PRESIDENT of the UNITED STATES.
GIVEN under my hand at the City of Washington, this TENTH day of April in the year of our Lord one thousand eight hundred and thirty nine and in the sixty third Year of the INDEPENDENCE OF THE UNITED STATES.

By the President M. Van Buren
J.K. Paulding Secretary of the Navy
Registered L B Hardin"

- April 10, 1839: Assigned to the U.S.S. Constitution.

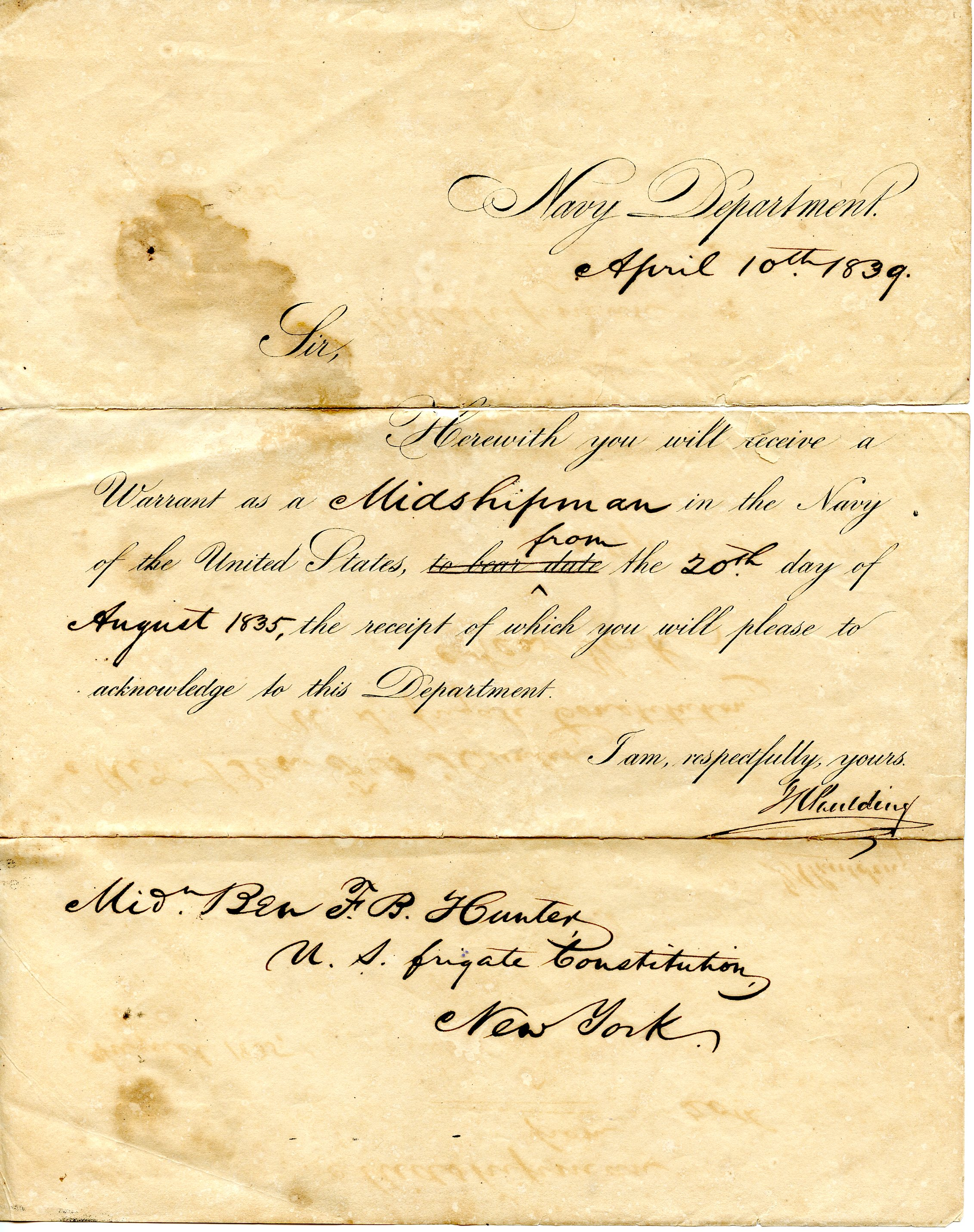
US Navy letter, Midshipman appointment for Benjamin F. B. Hunter

"Navy Department
April 10th 1839
Sir,
Herewith you will receive a Warrant as a Midshipman in the Navy of the United States, from the 20th day of August 1835, the receipt of which you will please acknowledge to this Department.
I am, respectfully, yours,
J K Paulding
Mid. Ben F.B. Hunter
U.S. frigate Constitution
New York"

- April 11, 1839: To the Constitution at NY.
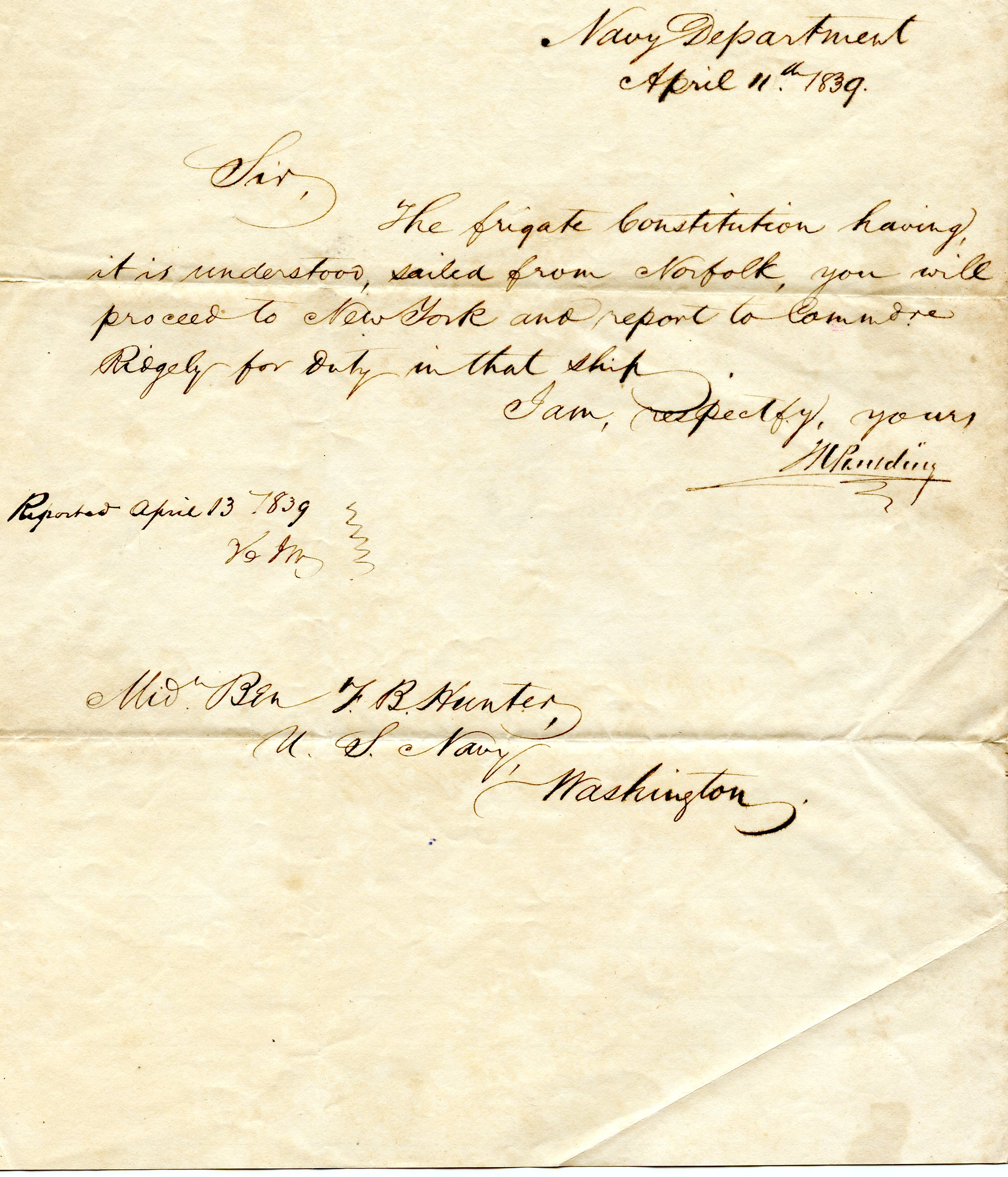
1839 Orders to the USS Constitution

"Navy Department
April 11th, 1839
Sir,
The Frigate Constitution having, it is understood, sailed from Norfolk, you will proceed to New York and report to Commodore Ridgely for duty in that ship.
I am respectly, yours
J K Paulding
Reported April 13, 1839
H M
Mid. Ben F.B. Hunter
U.S. Navy
Washington"

- April 13, 1839: Reported for duty.
- January 27, 1841: Permission to attend Naval School.

"Mid. Hunter reported this day
Feby. 2 1841
James Biddle
Navy Department
January 27th, 1841
Sir,
Agreeably to your request of the 25th inst. you have permission to attend the Naval School at Philadelphia, first reporting to Comm. Biddle, governor of the asylum.
In case you avail yourself of this permission you are to conform to all the regulations of that establishment, as you will be held responsible for their neglect or violation in the same manner as for disobedience of orders or other misconduct on board ship.
I am, respectfly, yours
J K Paulding
Mid
B.F.B. Hunter
U.S. Navy
Washington, D.C."

- June 30, 1841: Received Warrant as Passed Midshipman

"Navy Department
June 30th, 1841

Sir, I enclose to you a Warrant as a Passed Midshipman in the Navy of the United States, dated the 29th day of June 1841, assigning you rank as such from the 22nd day of June 1841, and numbered Six the receipt of which you will please acknowledge to this Department.

I am respectfully, yours
Geo. E. Badger

Pass. Mid.
B.F.B. Hunter
U.S. Navy
(Baltimore)
Washington, D.C."

- September 8, 1841: To the Madison.

"Navy Department
Sept. 8th, 1841

Sir,
You will proceed to New York without delay, and report to Captn. Perry for duty on board the U.S. Schooner Madison.

I am, respectfully,
Your obt. Sevt.
Geo. E. Badger

Pas.d Midn
Ben F. B. Hunter
U.S. Naval Depot of Charts
Washington
reported
Sept 14, 1841
M. C. Perry
Comdt."

- September 14, 1841

"Comdts office
Navy Yard New York
Sept 14 1841
Sir
In obedience to the written orders of the 8th inst -- you will report for duty to the Comdg officer of the U.S. Schr Madison.
Respectfully
M.C. Perry
Comdt
Pasd Mid
B.F.B. Hunter
U.S. Navy
Comdt."

- October 22, 1842: Detached from the Phoenix.
- February 4, 1843: Recg.ves at Charleston.
- September 27, 1843: Detached to the Vandalia as Acting Master.

"Navy Department
Sept. 27th, 1843

Sir,
You are hereby detached from the Schr. Wave and you will report to Commd. Kennedy for duty as Acting Master of the USS Ship Vandalia.

I am, respectfy, yours,
David Henshaw

Pass'd Mid
Ben F. B. Hunter
U.S. Navy
Norfolk"

- October 3, 1843: Previous order revoked & Waiting Orders.

"Navy Department
Oct 3d 1843

Sir,
The Vandalia having sailed your order to her is hereby revoked & you will regard yourself as "waiting orders".

I am, respectfy, yours
David Henshaw

Pass'd Mid'n
Ben F. B. Hunter
U.S. Navy
Washington, D. C."

- October 14, 1843: to the On-Ka-Hy-E as Master.
- October 25, 1843: Request to transfer account to Charleston S. C. station.

"Treasury Department
Fourth Audition Office
October 25th, 1843

Sir,
I have received your letter of the 21st inst- asking that your account may be transferred to the Charleston S.C. station.
The Schooner On-ka-hy-e to which you are now attached, is about to proceed to Charleston S.C.. On her arrival there the Navy agent at that place, who discharges the duties of Purser of that station, will pay the officers & crew of that vessel.

I am sir, respty,
Your Obt sevt
A. V. Dayton

Acty Master
Ben F. B. Hunter
U.S. Schooner On-ka-hy-e"

- April 17, 1844: det to the Somers.

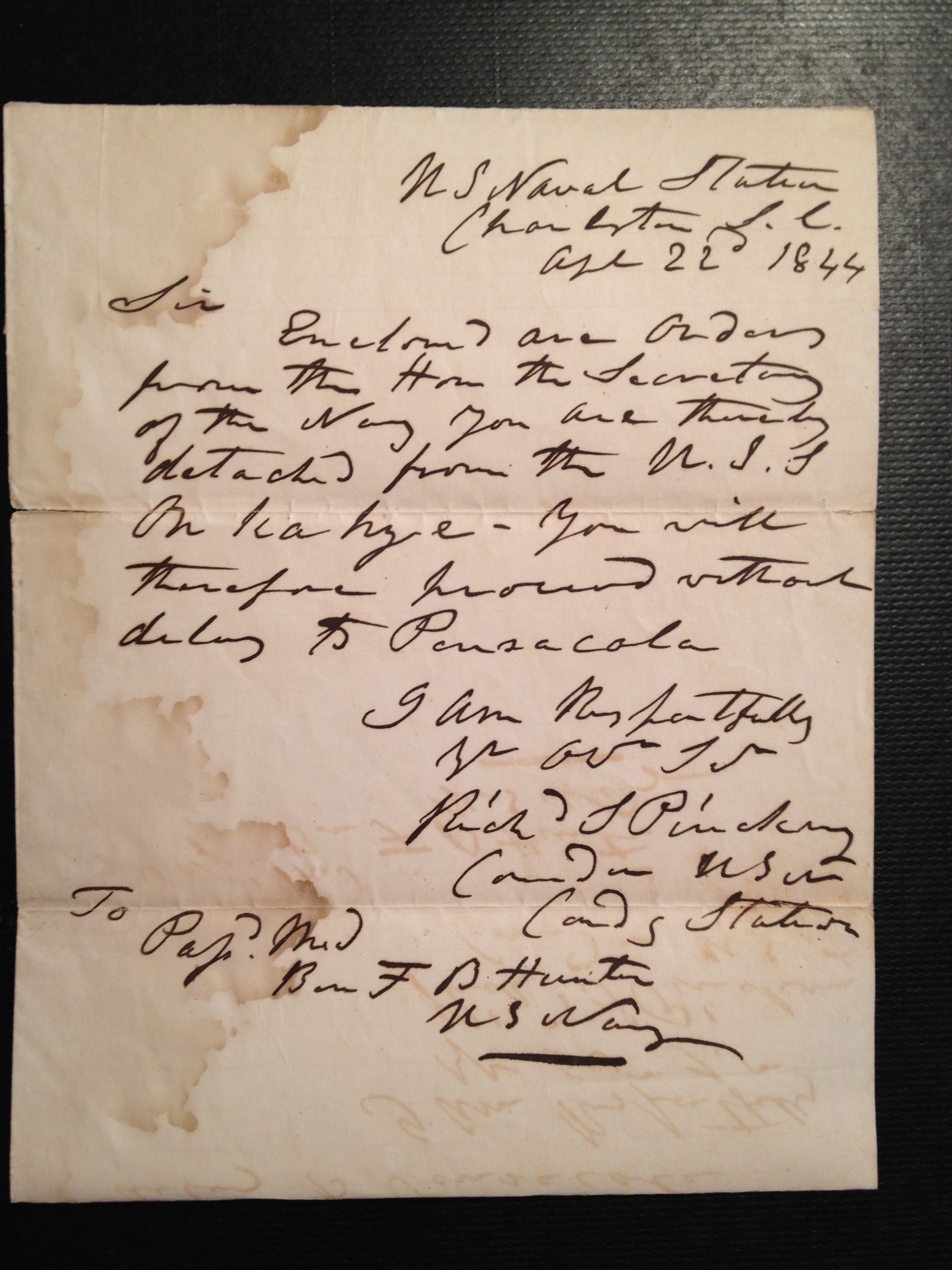
Original Naval Orders to detach from the U.S.S. On-ka-hy-e and proceed to Pensacola

- April 22, 1844: det from the On-ka-hy-e.

"U.S. Naval Station
Charleston, S.C.
Apr 22d, 1844

Sir,
Enclosed are orders from the Hon Secretary of the Navy you are thereby detached from the U.S.S. On ka hy e. You will therefore proceed without delay to Pensacola.

I am Respectfully,
Your Obt Serv't
Rich- T. Pinkney
Comdn USN
Comdn Station

To Pass'd Mid
Ben F. B. Hunter
U.S. Navy"

- April 14, 1845: Inquiry to Treasury Department, 4th Auditors Office, for payments due officers.
- June 24, 1845: to the Cyane as Acting Master. He sailed to the South Pacific on August 10, 1845, and made port calls in Callao, Sandwich Islands and Mazatlan. The USS Cyane's roster in August 1845 shows Benjamin Hunter as the ship's Acting Master.
- March 1846: Transferred to U.S.S. Portsmouth. Hunter was listed in the ship's roster as Acting Master with the 1847 Pacific Squadron.

The Portsmouth, "Old Poverty", first anchored at Monterey at the request of the American Counsel John Larkin, who was concerned for the welfare of the American citizens residing there. The USS Cyane and Levant now back from their mission to Honolulu relieved the Portsmouth of her guard duty and she proceeded to Yerba Buena. The mission was to claim California for the United States if war was declared and assist John Fremont who was in the Sacramento Valley.

- June 11, 1846: Orders to proceed up Sacramento River and deliver arms and supplies to Fremont's camp. In the Cruise of the Portsmouth Downey tells of the ship's launch being sent to Fremont's camp near the Sacramento River.

"New and startling rumors now began to spread about. Capt Fremont had returned to California, had been joined by Lt. Gillespie, who was on a secret mission from the States, and was determined to chastise Castro for his insolence. In furtherance of this plan, he had sent down to us a requisition for money, stores and ammunition and our launch was forewith to be fitted out, and proceed up the Sacramento River, with the necessary supplies. These rumors coupled with the great movements of cleaning, caulking and watering ship fully occupied our time. There for the first time this cruise we had a general wash".

Downey's book Filings From An Old Saw describes the departure of the launch..

"The launch, which had as well as the ship, undergone great repairs, was hauled alongside, and at once fitted for war. Her swivel was mounted on the bow, arm chest, ammunition, and fixed shot boxes secured in the stern, sheets-oars releathered, masts stepped and sails fitted, and everything betokened was about to be done. A staunch and trusty crew was assigned to her; the stores ordered were stowed in her; ten days rations issued to her men, she was put in the charge of Lieut [Benjamin F.B.] Hunter and at or about 10 P.M., she shoved off on an expedition unknown to any save the officers, and even they were as mute as the grave upon the subject of their destination".

Passages from Frd Blackburn Roger's book Montgomery and the Portsmouth describe the boatload of supplies sent to Fremont.

"Soon came the task of loading the Portsmouth's launch with the requisitioned supplies, among which were: "5 Bbls Flour, one dozen pork, one box soap, 2 boxes tobacco, 10 lbs candles, 3 dozen pair stockings, 100 Blue Flannel shirts, one sack coarse salt, one Breaker, 50 lbs Lead, 400 Percussion Caps, 37 yards Russia Duck, 73 yards No. 6 cotton canvas, 4 lbs. twine, one box Medicines, 500 lbs iron.
The launch was of good size: 30' length, 8'5" beam and 3'10" depth. When it departed June 11 it was deeply laden, for addition to the supplies it carried Lieut. B. F. B. Hunter (in charge), Gillespie and his colored servant, Purser James H Watmough, Asst. Surg Marius Duvall, Robert E. Russell, a pilot, and "a lawless Frenchman who had crossed the mountains with Capt. Fremont".

- July 29, 1846: Orders to take one of Portsmouth's boats from Yerba Buena to Sonoma with communications for Capt John Grigsby.

"USS Portsmouth
Yerbabuena July 29th, 1846
Sir,
You will proceed in one of the ships boats to Sonoma, and on your arrival there, hand to Capt John Grigsby, or the Commanding Officer present, the accompanying communication, and affording him such assistance, or information supporting the proposed changes in their Military organization as may be in your power. You will return without unnecessary delay and report to me.
Respectfully I am Sir
Your Obt Sevt,
John B. Montgomery
Commandg
To
Actg Lt. B.F.B. Hunter
U.S.Ship Portsmouth"

== Ships sailed ==
- USS Warren, (4th), 1825: 2nd class sloop, 18 guns, builder: Boston Navy Yard, sold at Panama Jan 1, 1863, 2 medium 32-pounders and 18 32-pounders carronades.
- USS Constitution, 1797: Frigate, 44 guns, length 175 b.p., moulded beam 43'6", depth in hold 14'3", 1,576 tons, builder: George Claighorne, launched October 21, 1797, at Boston, extensive repairs 1812-15, rebuilt 1831, 1871–77, 1906, 1927–30, still afloat Boston Harbor.
- USS James Madison, (2nd), 1842: Revenue cutter schooner, length 73'4" b.p., moulded beam 20'2", depth in hold 7'4", 112 tons, used by Navy during the Seminole Wars.
- USS Phoenix:
- USS Wave:
- USS Onkahye, 1843: Schooner, 2 guns, length 96', beam 22', 250 tons builder: William Capes, Williamsburg, N.Y., yacht purchased 1843, wrecked on Caicos Reef, West Indies, on June 21, 1848.
- USS Somers:
- USS Cyane:
- USS Portsmouth:
- USS Marion, 1838: 3rd Class Sloop, 16 guns, builder: Boston Navy Yard, 1838–1839, broken up 1871-1872.

== Family ==
Benjamin was the son of Colonel John Ware Hunter, US Army, who was a trumpeter for Patriot forces in the American Revolution and Margaret Donnel of Pennsylvania. Hunter married with Ms. Catharine Jane Pilmore on August 8, 1848, in the Trinity Episcopal Church, Natchez, Mississippi.

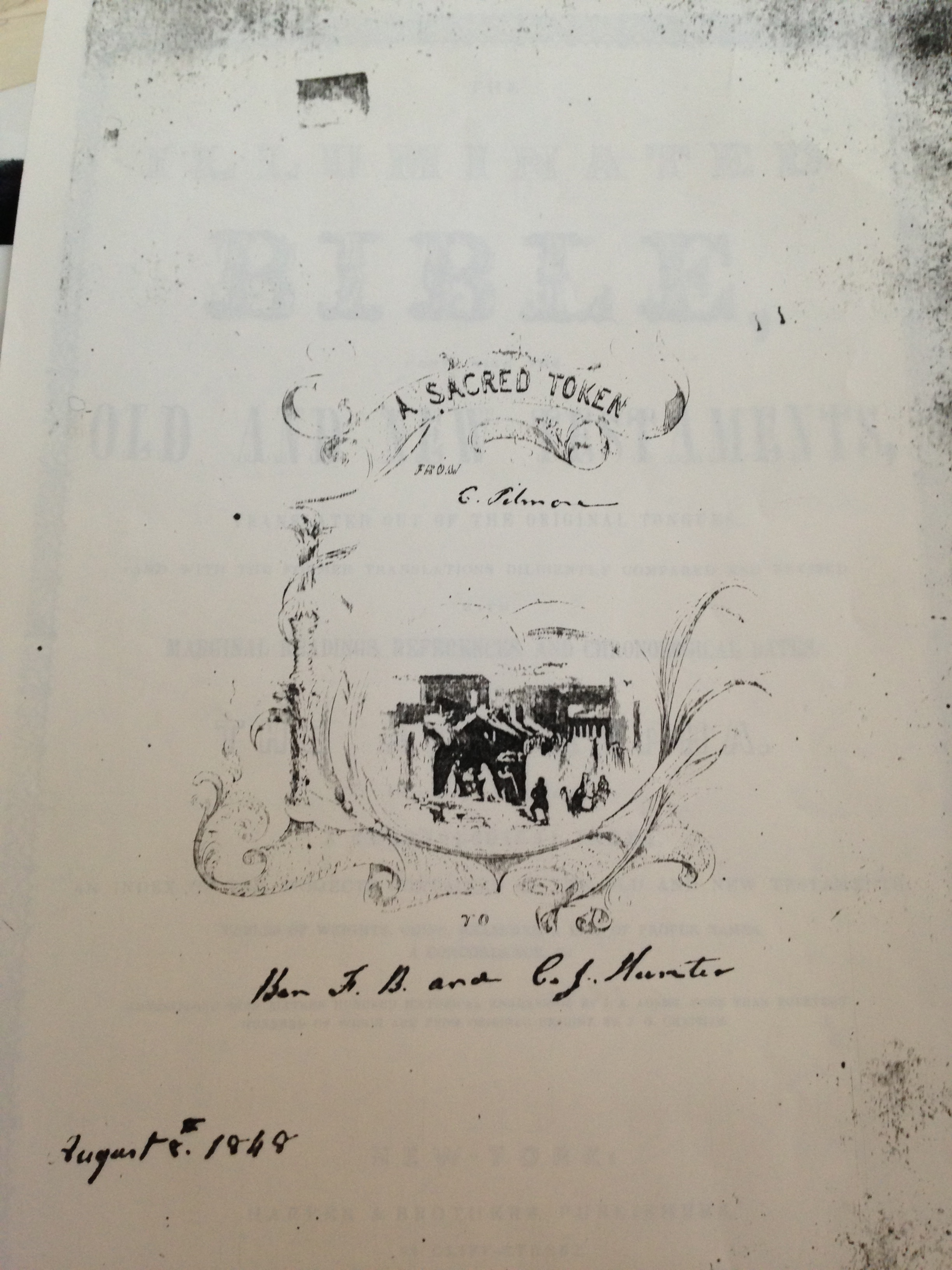
Copy of Sacred Token page from Benjamin F. B. Hunter and Catharine Jane Hunter Bible, presented by C. Pilmore on wedding day August 8, 1848

Family Bible, Illuminated Bible, The Apocrypha, Harper & Brothers, New York, 1846. Lost in estate sale, 2012

== Notes ==
Originals and copies of Naval Orders and Correspondence were obtained from Ms. Adrienne Nelson Heuer in 2012. Naval records were also obtained from the National Archives Naval Officer Records in Washington, D.C.

== Bibliography ==
- Bancroft, Hubert Howe. History of California by Edmund G. Brown. Santa Barbara: Hebbard, 1963.
- Bauer, K. Jack. Surfboats and Horse Marines: U.S. Naval Operations in the Mexican War, 1846-1848. Annapolis: U.S. Naval Institute, 1969.
- Bauer, K. Jack. The Mexican War, 1846-1848. New York: MacMillan, 1974.
- Beach, Edward Latimer. The United States Navy: 200 Years. 1st ed. New York: Holt, 1986.
- Bill, Alfred Hoyt. Rehearsal for Conflict: The War with Mexico, 1846-1848. New York: Knopf, 1947.
- Bishop, Farnham. Our First War with Mexico. New York: Scribner's, 1916.
- Bowen, Frank Charles. Men of the Wooden Walls. London: Staples, 1952.
- Bryant, Edwin. What I saw in California. n.p. Palo Alto, 1957.
- Buenzle, Fred J. Bluejacket: An Autobiography. By Neville T. Kirk. Annapolis, MD: Naval Institute Press, 1986.
- Bunting, W. H. Portrait of a Port: Boston 1852-1914. Cambridge, Mass: Harvard UP.
- Chappelle, Howard I. History of the American Sailing Navy. New York: Norton, 1949.
- Connolly, James Brendan. Navy Men. New York: Day, 1939.
- Dana, Richard Henry. Two Years Before the Mast. By James D. Hart. New York: Modern Library, 1936.
- Downey, Joseph T. Filings from an Old Saw. San Francisco: Howell, 1957.
- Downey, Joseph T. The Cruise of the Portsmouth. Ed. Howard Lamar. New Haven and London: Yale UP, 1958.
- Lang, Alexander Kinnan. Clipper Ship Men. Garden City, New York: Garden City, 1944.
- Levi, Uriah Phillips. Manual of International Rules and Regulations for Men of War. New York: Van Nostrand, 1862.
- Lyman, Chester S. Around the Horn to the Sandwich Islands and California 1845-1850. Ed. Frederick J. Teggart. New Haven: Yale UP, 1924.
- Mahon, Alfred Thayer. From Sail to Steam: Recollections of a Naval Life. New York: Da Capo, 1968.
- Masefield, John. Sea Life in Nelson's Times. By C. C. Lloyd. 3rd ed. U.S. Naval Institute, 1971.
- Melville, Herman. White Jacket. Oxford: UP, 1924.
- Mercier, Henry James. Life in a Man of War. By Elliot Snow. Boston: Houghton, 1927.
- Preble, George H. History of the U.S. Navy Yard, Portsmouth, N.H. Washington: Bur. Yards and Docks, 1892.
- Rogers, Fred B. Montgomery and the Portsmouth. San Francisco: J. Howell, 1958.
- Risk, James. The Pacific Theater of Naval Warfare in the Mexican American War. California State Military Museum accessed online at https://www.militarymuseum.org/NavyMexWar.html
- Smelser, Marshall. The Congress Founds the Navy 1787-1789. Notre Dame: UP, 1959.
- Smith, Myron. The American Navy, 1789-1860. New Jersey: Scarecrow, 1974.
- Villiers, John. Of Ships and Men, a Personal Anthology. New York: Arco, 1962.
- Wilcox, Cadmus M, and Mary R. Wilcox. History of the Mexican War. Washington, D.C: Church News Pub. Co, 1892.
- William Hugh Robarts, "Mexican War veterans: a complete roster of the regular and volunteer troops in the war between the United States and Mexico, from 1846 to 1848; the volunteers are arranged by states, alphabetically", BRENTANO'S, (A. S. WITHERBEE & CO, Proprietors, WASHINGTON, D.C., 1887. pp. 10-13
