= John R. Goldsborough =

United States Navy commodore (1809–1877)

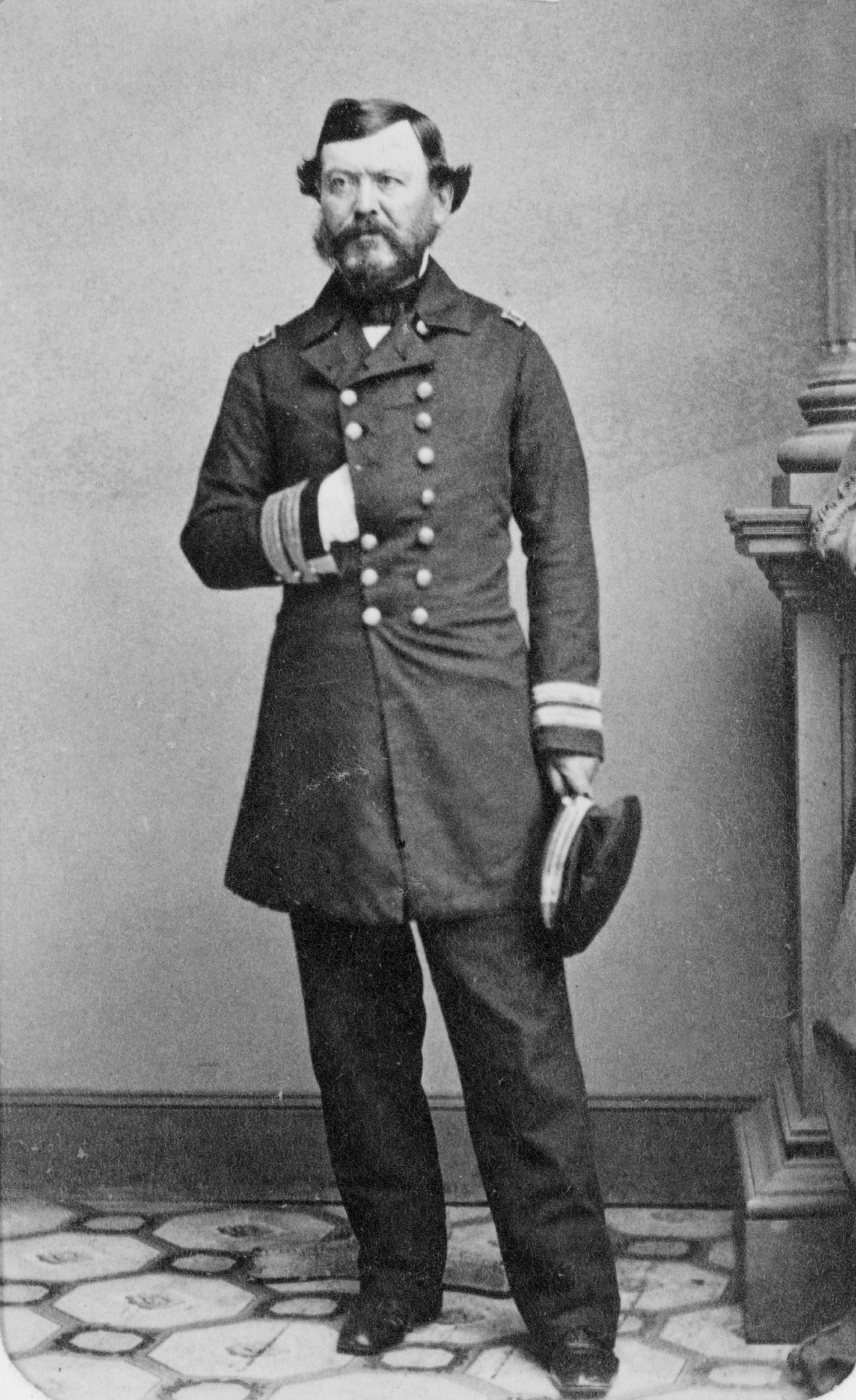
- Born: 2 July 1809; Washington, D.C.
- Died: 22 June 1877 (aged 67); Philadelphia, Pennsylvania
- Burial place: Church of St. James the Less, Philadelphia, Pennsylvania
- Relatives: Louis M. Goldsborough (brother)
- Military career
- Allegiance: United States of America
- Branch: United States Navy
- Service years: 1824–1870
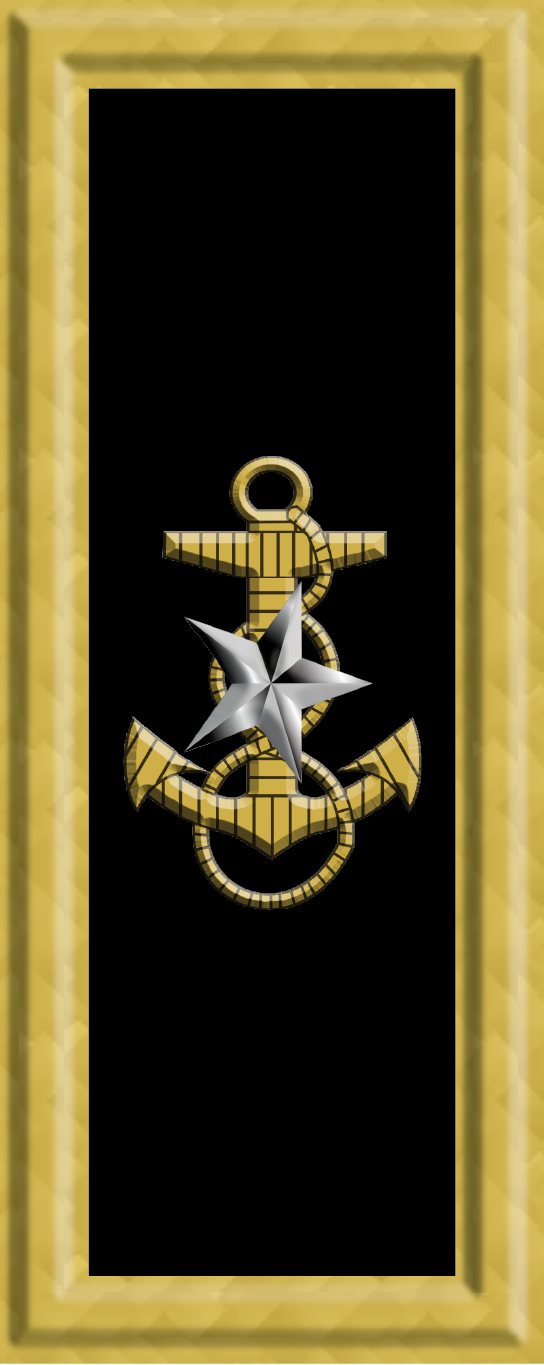
- Rank: Commodore
- Commands: USS Wave; Naval Rendezvous, Philadelphia; USS Union; USS Florida; St. Simons Island, Georgia; USS Colorado; USS Shenandoah; Asiatic Squadron
- Conflicts: Actions against Greek pirates; American Civil War; Union blockade

John R. Goldsborough (2 July 1809 – 22 June 1877) was an American naval officer who fought in the Union Navy during the American Civil War.

Goldsborough was made a cadet-midshipman in 1824 and as such saw action in the Mediterranean against pirates. In one incident, while in charge of 18 men he attacked and captured a Greek pirate ship with a 58-man crew. Promoted to lieutenant in 1837 he was involved in charting the United States East Coast and in 1847 introduced the standardized system of markings for buoys and navigational markers ashore still in use in the United States today.

Goldsborough was a commodore at the outbreak of the American Civil War in April 1861, commanding the screw steamer USS Union. That year the Union captured several Confederate blockade runners and engaged and destroyed the Confederate privateer York. He was promoted to captain in 1862. During the rest of the war he was successful in several commands, capturing further Confederate ships.

After the war he voyaged widely in the Atlantic, Indian Ocean and China Sea. In 1868 he was briefly Commander-in-Chief of the Asiatic Squadron. He retired in 1870.

== Naval career ==
=== Early career ===
Goldsborough was born in Washington, D.C., on 2 July 1809, the son of a chief clerk in the United States Department of the Navy. He was a cadet-midshipman aboard the frigate USS John Adams, the flagship of Commodore David Porter in the West Indies Squadron, before being appointed as a midshipman on 6 or 16 November 1824 (sources vary). His older brother was Rear Admiral Louis M. Goldsborough (18 February 1805 – 20 February 1877). As a midshipman, he was attached to the ship-of-the-line USS North Carolina and the sloop-of-war USS Warren in the Mediterranean Squadron from November 1824 to June 1830. During his time aboard Warren, he took part in actions against Greek pirates which had attacked American merchant ships in the Mediterranean Sea, highlighted by Warren's bombardment of Miconi and an action in which Goldsborough, in command of Warren's launch with 18 men aboard, engaged and captured the Greek pirate schooner Helene of four guns and 58 men. Warren's commanding officer, Master Commandant Lawrence Kearny, personally thanked him for the manner in which he carried out the capture of Helene.

=== Coast Survey duty ===
Goldsborough was promoted to passed midshipman on 28 April 1832 and to lieutenant on 6 September 1837. From 1844 to 1850 he was assigned to the United States Coast Survey and was involved in charting the United States East Coast, commanding the schooner USS Wave for at least part of that time. Prior to Goldsborough's Coast Survey tour, U.S. Navy Lieutenant George M. Bache, while attached to the Survey in 1838, had suggested standardizing the markings of buoys and navigational markers ashore by painting those on the right when entering a harbor red and those on the left black, and Goldsborough instituted this system in 1847. Known as the "red right return" system, it has been in use in the United States ever since.

Promoted to commander on 14 September 1855, Goldsborough commanded the Naval Rendezvous at Philadelphia, Pennsylvania, from 1855 to 1859, then spent 1860 awaiting orders.

=== American Civil War ===
After the outbreak of the American Civil War in April 1861, on May 17, 1861, Goldsborough was in command of the newly commissioned screw steamer USS Union in the newly re-designated Atlantic Blockading Squadron, and initiated the Union blockade of Savannah, Georgia, on 28 May 1861. On 1 June 1861, Union captured a Confederate blockade runner, the schooner C. W. Johnson with a cargo of railroad iron, off the coast of North Carolina; she also captured the blockade runner Amelia, carrying a cargo of contraband from Liverpool, England, off Charleston, South Carolina, on 18 June 1861. On 28 July 1861, Union destroyed the former Union brig B. T. Martin, which had been captured by the Confederate privateer York and then run aground by the Confederates, north of Cape Hatteras, North Carolina. On 9 August 1861, York captured the Union schooner George G. Baker and Union intervened, recapturing George G. Baker and forcing the crew of York to set York on fire and abandon her off Cape Hatteras. Union then was transferred to the Potomac Flotilla in August 1861.

Goldsborough took command of the newly commissioned sidewheel steamer USS Florida in the South Atlantic Blockading Squadron on 5 October 1861, was again successful in capturing blockade runners, and participated in the capture of Fernandina, Florida, on 3 March 1862. He was promoted to captain on 16 July 1862 and that summer took command of a settlement of former slaves at St. Simons Island, Georgia. In March 1863 he became commanding officer of the steam frigate USS Colorado in the Western Gulf Blockading Squadron and took charge of the blockade of Mobile, Alabama, with Colorado capturing the schooner Hunter on 17 May 1863. He left Colorado in November 1863 and took up ordnance duty at Portsmouth Navy Yard in Kittery, Maine, remaining in that position through the end of the war in April 1865.

=== Later career ===
From 1865 to 1868, Goldsborough commanded the screw sloop-of-war USS Shenandoah, voyaging to the Azores and Brazil in late 1865 for service in the South Atlantic Squadron. In 1866, Shenandoah was transferred to the Asiatic Squadron and steamed from South America around Africa's Cape of Good Hope in July 1866 to Mauritius in August 1866, then on to India, Siam, Hong Kong (calling there in March 1867), and Japan, calling at Yokohama in August 1867. Goldsborough was promoted to commodore on 13 April 1867 while aboard Shenandoah.

The commander-in-chief of the Asiatic Squadron, Rear Admiral Henry H. Bell, drowned along with 11 of the other 14 men aboard when his boat capsized while crossing the bar at Osaka, Japan, while attempting to take him ashore from the squadron's flagship, the sloop-of-war USS Hartford, on the morning of 11 January 1868. Transferring from Shenandoah to Hartford, Goldsborough as senior surviving officer took temporary command of the squadron that day, remaining in command until relieved by Rear Admiral Stephen C. Rowan on 18 April 1868.

Goldsborough retired from the Navy on 2 July 1870.

== Personal life ==
Around 1833, Goldsborough married the former Mary Lawrence Pennington (29 August 1825 – 8 May 1869), who resided in Philadelphia during his Navy service.

Goldsborough was a Freemason during his lifetime, but later withdrew from both Masonic Lodges of which he was a member.

== Death ==
Goldsborough died in Philadelphia on 22 June 1877. He is buried with his wife at the Church of St. James the Less in Philadelphia.

== Notes ==
Military offices
Preceded by Henry H. Bell	Commander, Asiatic Squadron; 11 January 1868–18 April 1868	Succeeded by Stephen C. Rowan
