= USS Goldsborough =

Three ships in the United States Navy have been named USS Goldsborough for Louis M. Goldsborough.

- The first USS Goldsborough (TB-20) was a torpedo boat, commissioned in 1908, served in World War I and decommissioned in 1919.
- The second USS Goldsborough (DD-188) was a Clemson-class destroyer, commissioned in 1920, served in World War II and decommissioned in 1945. She was reclassified as AVP-18, AVD-5 and APD-32 throughout her career.
- The third USS Goldsborough (DDG-20) was Charles F. Adams-class guided missile destroyer, commissioned in 1963 and decommissioned in 1993.
