= Cape Caphereus =

Promontory on the island of Euboea, Greece

Coordinates: 38.062°N 24.563°E

Cape Caphereus or Cape Kafireas (Greek: Ακρωτήριο Καφηρέας, older form: Καφηρεύς), also known as Cavo D'Oro (Greek: Κάβο Ντόρο, from the Italian for "Cape of Gold"), is a promontory on the southeastern tip of the Greek island of Euboea in the Aegean Sea.

With the nearby island of Andros, it forms the Kafireas Straits or Doro Channel - historically called the Doro Passage or D'Oro Passage.

In earlier times, the channel was one of the most dangerous areas for shipping in the entire Aegean. The Battle of Doro Passage took place on 16 October 1827, and was a small naval engagement in which a British merchant ship, Comet, was captured by Greek pirates but then liberated by an escorting warship USS Porpoise. Sinkings in the channel include the British sailing ship Providence in 1835, the sailing vessel Kleopatra sunk during World War I by UC-23 and the SS Tampico, an Italian tanker, torpedoed during World War II.

== See also ==
- Kafireas, a local community
