= Kafireas =

Kafireas Καφηρέας
- Municipal unit
- Location within the regional unit

- Location within Greece
- Coordinates: 38°07′N 24°34′E
- Country: Greece
- Administrative region: Central Greece
- Regional unit: Euboea
- Municipality: Karystos

Area
  - Municipal unit: 77.77 km^{2} (30.03 sq mi)

Population (2021)
  - Municipal unit: 282
  - Municipal unit density: 3.63/km^{2} (9.39/sq mi)
- Time zone: UTC+2 (EET)
  - Summer (DST): UTC+3 (EEST)
- Vehicle registration: ΧΑ

Kafireas (Greek: Καφηρέας) is a former community in Euboea, Greece, named after the nearby Cape Kafireas. Since the 2011 local government reform it is part of the municipality Karystos, of which it is a municipal unit. The municipal unit has an area of 77.770 km^{2}. Population 282 (2021). The seat of the community was in Amygdalia. Kafireas (Cavondoros) is an Arvanitika speaking community.
