= USS Aucilla =

Oiler of the United States Navy

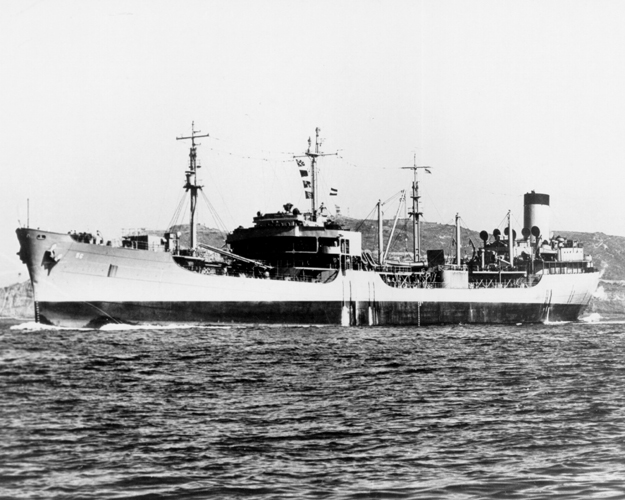

History

United States
- Name: USS Aucilla
- Namesake: Aucilla River
- Ordered: as T3-S2-A1 tanker hull, MC hull 722
- Laid down: 25 May 1943
- Launched: 20 November 1943
- Commissioned: 22 December 1943
- Decommissioned: 18 December 1970
- Stricken: 1 December 1976
- Identification: AO-56
- Fate: Sold for scrap, 25 October 1992

General characteristics
- Class & type: Cimarron-class fleet oiler
- Displacement: 7,236 t.(lt) 25,440 t.(fl)
- Length: 553 ft (169 m)
- Beam: 75 ft (23 m)
- Draught: 32 ft (9.8 m)
- Installed power: 30,400 hp (22,700 kW)
- Propulsion: geared turbines, twin screws
- Speed: 18 knots (33 km/h; 21 mph)
- Capacity: 146,000 barrels
- Complement: 314
- Armament: one single 5 in (130 mm) dual purpose gun mount; four single 3 in (76 mm)/50 dual purpose gun mounts; four twin 40 mm AA gun mounts; four twin 20 mm AA gun mounts

USS Aucilla (AO-56) was a Cimarron-class fleet oiler. She was constructed for the United States Navy during World War II and her assignment was to provide liquids, such as fuel or water, to ships in the forward battle areas. She survived this dangerous task and returned home post-war with five battle stars to her credit.

Aucilla was laid down on 25 May 1943 at Sparrows Point, Maryland, by the Bethlehem Steel Co. under a United States Maritime Commission contract (MC hull 722); launched on 20 November 1943; sponsored by Mrs. Hope Ridings Miller; and commissioned on 22 December 1943.

== World War II ==
=== North Atlantic operations ===
The oiler remained at Sparrows Point until 28 December at which time she got underway for Portsmouth, Virginia. She arrived at the Norfolk Navy Yard on the 29th and began training the crew at battle stations and loading ammunition. Aucilla continued her training both in port and underway in the lower Chesapeake Bay. On 2 February 1944, she departed Norfolk in company with the destroyer Goldsborough on her way to the British West Indies. The oiler arrived at the Naval Operating Base (NOB), Trinidad, on 7 February and began dispensing fuel to warships operating in the vicinity. She remained there until 14 March at which time she put to sea, in convoy, for Aruba. Aucilla arrived at her destination on 16 March, took on a cargo of aviation gasoline, and departed Aruba on 17 March. After a stop at Guantánamo Bay, Cuba, the oiler arrived in Norfolk, Virginia, on 24 March.

=== Convoyed to the United Kingdom ===
For about a month, she operated out of Norfolk in the lower Chesapeake Bay testing fueling at sea gear and techniques. On 26 April, Aucilla departed Norfolk in company with the destroyer Belknap and, five days later, arrived in Baytown, Texas. After taking on a cargo of fuel, the ship stood out of Baytown on 4 May and arrived at Staten Island, New York, on the 8th. On 14 May, she was underway, in convoy, for the British Isles. The oiler parted company with the convoy on 25 May and entered port at Liverpool, England, that same day. She discharged her cargo on 27 May and got underway for Ireland the next day. She visited Belfast Lough from 29 May to 5 June and then headed back to the United States. Aucilla arrived at Norfolk on 16 June.

Six days after her arrival, the oiler sailed from Norfolk for New York. She arrived on 23 June and operated in that locale until the end of the month. On 2 July, Aucilla put to sea bound for Europe once again. She returned to Belfast on 12 July but stopped only briefly, returning to sea that same day. The oiler visited Swansea, Wales, between 13 and 16 July before heading home via Belfast. She reentered Hampton Roads on 27 July. There, she stayed for almost a month. On 22 August, Aucilla put to sea in company with the destroyer J. Fred Talbott bound for Baytown, Texas. She took on a cargo of fuel oil at Baytown before returning to sea. The ship arrived at Bermuda on 3 September and unloaded her cargo. She then headed back to Hampton Roads, Virginia, where she dropped anchor on 8 September. Operations in Chesapeake Bay followed.

=== Transfer to the Pacific Fleet ===
On 4 October, Aucilla put to sea bound for the Caribbean. She arrived at Aruba on 9 October and loaded fuel oil until 11 October when she set sail for Panama. The oiler transited the Panama Canal on 13 October and, the following day, departed Balboa, Panama, for the Hawaiian Islands. She stopped over at Pearl Harbor from 26 to 29 October and then continued her voyage west. The ship anchored in Eniwetok lagoon on 5 November. She spent the next two days unloading her cargo of fuel before continuing on to Ulithi on 7 November. There, she reported for duty to the Commander, Service Squadron (ServRon) 10.

=== Supporting Iwo Jima and Okinawa operations ===
For the remainder of the war, Aucilla supported U.S. 3rd Fleet/U.S. 5th Fleet operations in the western Pacific Ocean by refueling its units at sea. She provided fuel to the 3rd Fleet during its air attacks on Luzon in mid-December 1944 and again at the end of the first week in January 1945. When the 3rd Fleet entered the South China Sea in mid-January, Aucilla continued her fueling rendezvous with its warships. Between 15 and 26 February, she steamed in an area off Iwo Jima providing logistics support for the 5th Fleet. She fueled that same fleet from 16 March to 4 May during the invasion of Okinawa. The oiler rounded out her wartime service supporting the 3rd Fleet on its final series of raids on the Japanese home islands between 11 July and 15 August.

=== End-of-war activity ===
Following the cessation of hostilities, Aucilla continued steaming with the 3rd Fleet off Japan. After a brief stop at Ulithi, she set sail for Japan on 27 September. The oiler entered Tokyo Bay on 2 October—one month to the day after Japan formally surrendered. The oiler performed extensive occupation duty at various locations in the Far East between the end of the war and the summer of 1947.

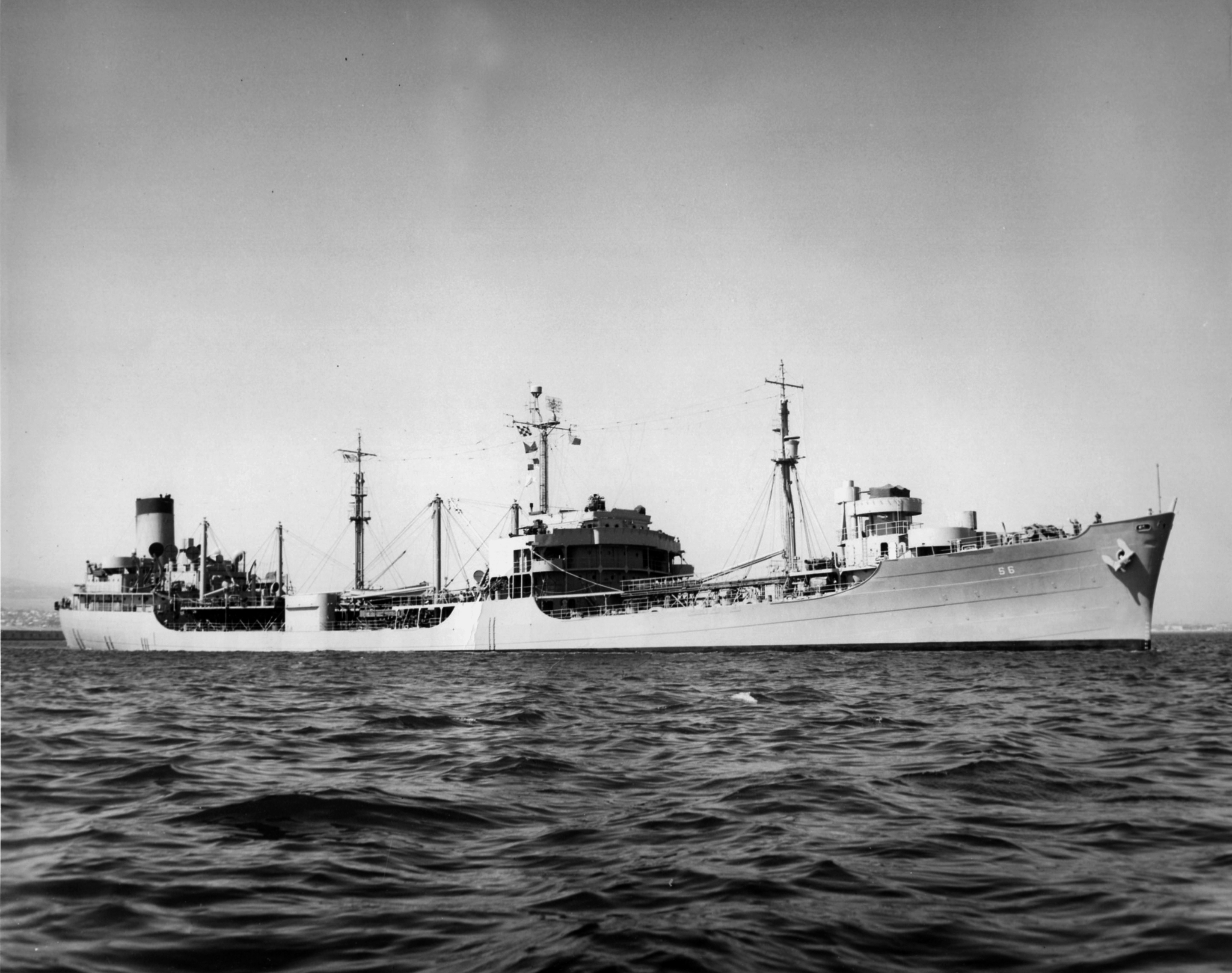

=== Supporting nuclear test ships at Bikini ===
That service also included some logistics support work for the ships of Joint Task Force 1, the task organization engaged in the atomic bomb tests conducted at Bikini Atoll during the summer of 1946. The western Pacific cruise in the summer and fall of 1948 ended with Aucilla steaming through the Indian Ocean, the Suez Canal, and the Mediterranean before she crossed the Atlantic to join the fleet stationed on the eastern seaboard of the United States.

== East Coast operations ==
For about four years, the oiler operated along the U.S. East Coast, in the Gulf of Mexico, and in the Caribbean taking on oil at various oil ports and carrying it to the fleet. She also conducted independent ship's exercises and amphibious exercises both at Vieques Island near Puerto Rico and at Onslow Beach in North Carolina. At this time she was attached to MSTS. In 1950 she was deployed to Sasebo Japan to support the Korean War operation. She left Norfolk, Virginia in October 1950, where she was in for repairs at the Portsmouth Navy yard. Her home port was Mare Island Ca. She steamed through the Med. down through the Suez Canal, the Red Sea and up into the Persian Gulf to Ras Tanura where she loaded bunker oil. Leaving this port she headed through the Indian Ocean, the Straights of Molacca, around Singapore and headed North for Sasebo where she unloaded her cargo. Headed south again to Bahrain for another load of oil. Again leaving, headed for Sasebo once again. Arriving Sasebo and unloading she headed for Pearl Harbor. leaving Pearl harbor and returning to Sasebo, Japan. She returned to San Francisco and was detached from MSTS and attached to the fleet as a fleet tanker. Returning to Norfolk via the Panama Canal, completing her round the world voyage and assumed her duties a fleet tanker.

In June 1952, Aucilla embarked upon the first of a long series of deployments to the Mediterranean. Four months later, she resumed operations along the eastern seaboard and in the West Indies. The first part of 1953 saw the oiler engaged in another series of training evolutions in the Puerto Rico-Vieques Island area.

== Midshipman cruise to Rio ==
June and July 1953 brought a midshipman cruise which took her to Rio de Janeiro, Brazil, and Barbados in the British West Indies. In September, Aucilla deployed to the Mediterranean Sea once more. She completed that assignment late in January 1954 and returned to Norfolk on 3 February 1954. Following post-deployment standdown and participation in the annual fleet exercise, Operation Springboard, the oiler resumed fuel services for the U.S. 2nd Fleet from her base at Norfolk, Virginia. May brought rough weather fueling tests in the North Atlantic followed by a two-month overhaul at a civilian shipyard in Baltimore, Maryland.

== Caribbean operations ==
In August, Aucilla departed Baltimore and steamed down Chesapeake Bay to rejoin the active units of the Atlantic Fleet. She performed normal logistics services and training operations out of Norfolk until November. Late that month, the oiler put to sea for Gonaïves, Haiti, to provide support for some unspecified tests conducted by the Operational Development Force for the Bureau of Ordnance. In the course of those operations, the oiler visited Guantánamo Bay, Cuba, and Port-au-Prince, Haiti. When the ship returned to the United States early in December, she entered the Bethlehem Shipyard at Hoboken, New Jersey, for a three-month modification and repair period. Between mid-April and early May 1955, Aucilla completed refresher training out of Newport, Rhode Island. She then returned to Norfolk where she began preparations for an extended tour of duty with the 6th Fleet.

== Service in the Mediterranean Sea ==
=== Homeported in Barcelona, Spain ===
On 31 May 1955 the ship stood out of Norfolk en route to her new home port, Barcelona, Spain. She reached her destination on 20 June. For the next 22 months, Aucilla served with Task Force (TF) 63 in a logistics support role. She participated in a number of exercises and visited ports all along the shores of the Mediterranean Sea. On 2 April 1957, the oiler headed back to the United States. She spent the entire summer of 1957 engaged in repairs, first a four-month regular overhaul at the New York Naval Shipyard and then boiler repairs at Key Highway Shipyard of the Bethlehem Steel Corporation, in Baltimore, Maryland. Between 16 September and 27 October, Aucilla completed refresher training—out of Guantánamo Bay—and post-refresher availability.

=== Supporting landings in Lebanon ===
On 28 October 1957, she set sail from Norfolk on her way back to the Mediterranean Sea. Once again, she spent her time ranging the length and breadth of the Mediterranean supporting the operations of TF 63. During the summer of 1958, Aucilla provided logistics support for the ships, sailors, and marines involved in the landings in Lebanon earned out in order to help restore order after severe factional fighting. Following that interlude, the oiler resumed normal U.S. 6th Fleet operations. On 30 May 1959, Aucilla headed back to the United States for a regular overhaul at the Boston Naval Shipyard. The overhaul lasted about six months. During that time, the oiler received a new home port assignment, Norfolk. The ship completed overhaul and set sail from Boston on 18 November, bound for refresher training in the Guantánamo Bay operating area. She shaped a course from the West Indies back to Norfolk on 16 December and arrived at her destination in time to spend the holidays there.

=== Continued support of the 6th Fleet ===
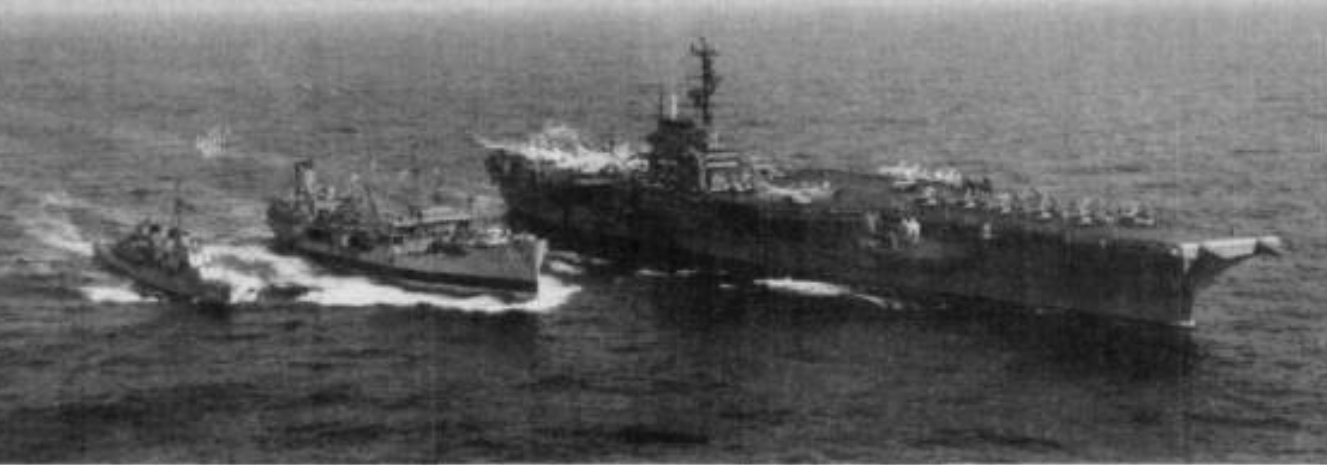
Aucilla refueling USS Forrestal and USS Newman K. Perry, 25 March 1960

Underway again on 4 January 1960, Aucilla operated in the vicinity of Norfolk until late in the month. On the 28th, she put to sea bound for the Mediterranean Sea. That seven-month deployment followed the pattern of previous ones, mixing port visits with logistics missions in support of 6th Fleet combat units. The oiler returned to Norfolk on 31 August and, after the usual leave and upkeep period, resumed normal east coast-West Indies operations. That routine lasted into 1961. In February and March 1961, she participated in the annual fleet exercise Operation Springboard. She returned to Norfolk on 17 March and began preparations for another tour of duty with the 6th Fleet. On 15 May 1961, she stood out of Norfolk and shaped a course for the Mediterranean Sea. Aucilla served a 14-week deployment that followed patterns established earlier.

== Yard Overhaul at Norfolk ==
The oiler reentered Norfolk on 11 September 1961 and began post-deployment standdown. Following the leave and upkeep period, she started preparations for overhaul. On 20 November, she entered the yard at the Norfolk Shipbuilding & Drydock Co. Aucilla completed her overhaul on 20 February 1962 and then set sail on 1 March for five weeks of refresher training in the West Indies. Upon completion of refresher training, the oiler joined an underway replenishment group to support the amphibious Exercise "Phiblex 1-62", also conducted in the West Indies. Later, she returned to United States' waters to participate in Fleet Exercise "Quick Kick." That summer, she conducted a midshipman training cruise and took part in convoy exercises off the eastern seaboard.

== European tour of duty ==
The oiler continued operations out of Norfolk through the end of 1962 and into 1963. On 7 March 1963, Aucilla left Chesapeake Bay on her way back to the Mediterranean. The deployment lasted just under four months. She was back in Norfolk by 1 July. Following post-deployment standdown, the oiler got underway on 6 August to participate in NATO Exercise "Riptide IV" conducted in the eastern Atlantic. As an adjunct to that mission, she visited Bremerhaven, Germany, and Rota, Spain, before returning to Norfolk on 11 September. For the remainder of 1963, Aucilla conducted local operations out of her home port.

== Visiting the 1964 New York World's Fair ==
Similar duty occupied her time during the first two months of 1964. On 3 March 1964, however, the oiler entered the yard at the Norfolk Shipbuilding & Drydock Co. for a regular overhaul. She completed repairs and modifications late in June and put to sea on 29 March for a month of refresher training in the Guantánamo Bay operating area. At the conclusion of refresher training, Aucilla voyaged north to New York where her crew members visited the World's Fair. The ship returned to Norfolk on 8 August and resumed local operations. That resumption lasted just one month. On 8 September, Aucilla got underway from Norfolk once more to participate in a series of NATO exercises in the eastern Atlantic. She visited Bremerhaven, Germany, again at the end of the exercises early in October. She returned to Norfolk on 23 October 1964.

== Reassigned to the 6th Fleet ==
Upon her return to her home port, she began preparations for another assignment with the 6th Fleet. Aucilla left Norfolk on 27 November and arrived in Rota, Spain, on 8 December. Another standard 6th Fleet tour of duty ensued with Aucilla fueling units of the fleet, participating in exercises, and visiting Mediterranean ports. She concluded the deployment with her arrival back in Norfolk on 11 May 1965. From late June to late July, Aucilla cruised the waters of the West Indies in support of U.S. 2nd Fleet units keeping an eye on the latest crisis to trouble the Dominican Republic.

== Supporting Gemini space shots ==
She returned to Norfolk on 23 July and resumed local operations out of her home port. Those operations included support roles in the Gemini 6 and Gemini 7 space shots during October, November, and December. Aucilla reentered Norfolk on 23 December to begin her holiday leave and upkeep period.

Further upkeep and a tender availability period occupied her time during January and February 1966. Early in March, the oiler put to sea for another cruise with the 6th Fleet in the Mediterranean. She arrived in Cartagena, Spain, on 15 March and, for the next five months, provided logistics support for United States naval forces in the Mediterranean. Aucilla departed Rota, Spain, on 12 August and set a course for home. The oiler arrived in Norfolk on the 22d and remained there in a leave and upkeep status until the middle of October.

== Assigned recovery ship for Titan IIIC heat shield ==
She put to sea again on 18 October to serve as a recovery ship for a United States Air Force Titan III-C heat shield qualification test. She returned to Norfolk from that mission on 21 November and remained in port for the rest of the year.

== Responding to the Six-Day Arab-Israeli War ==
On 6 February 1967, Aucilla stood out of Norfolk once again on her way to the Mediterranean. She arrived in Rota, Spain, on the 17th and soon began making the rounds to ports in the "middle sea." The most notable event of that deployment was the Six-Day Arab-Israeli War to which units of the 6th Fleet -- Aucilla included—responded with alacrity. She and her colleagues moved quickly to the eastern Mediterranean early in June, out the rapidity with which the Arab forces collapsed allowed them to return to a more normal routine at mid-month. Thus, the oiler resumed port visits, exercise, and fueling operations. She completed turnover proceedings at Rota on 19 and 20 August and headed back to the United States on the latter day. Aucilla arrived back in Norfolk on 30 August. After post-deployment standdown, the oiler entered the yard at the Norfolk Shipbuilding & Drydock Co. for regular overhaul on 13 November.

== South Atlantic operations ==
Aucilla completed her overhaul by 5 April 1968. On that day, she stood out of Norfolk on her way to refresher training in the West Indies. The oiler completed that mission in May and returned to Norfolk on the 19th. Soon thereafter, she embarked upon a two-month voyage that took her to the Cape of Good Hope where she refueled the Vietnam-bound aircraft carrier Intrepid. In addition, Aucilla made port calls at Rio de Janeiro in Brazil, St. Thomas in the Virgin Islands, Nassau in the Bahamas, and at Philadelphia, Pennsylvania, before returning to Norfolk on 10 August.

== Last voyage and disposal ==
At that time, the oiler began a tender availability as well as a leave and upkeep period preparatory to overseas movement. Aucilla stood out of Norfolk on 23 September; and, on 3 October she relieved Kaskaskia at Rota. After almost five months fueling the ships of the 6th Fleet and making port visits throughout the Mediterranean, Aucilla departed Rota late in March 1969. She arrived back in Norfolk on 5 April. After the usual post-deployment standdown, the oiler began normal operations out of Norfolk. For the next 14 months, the ship cruised the waters along the eastern seaboard and the West Indies in support of the ships of the Atlantic Fleet. Aucilla returned to Norfolk from her last voyage early in July 1970.

In the middle of September 1970, she began preparations for inactivation. Aucilla was placed out of commission at Norfolk on 18 December 1970 being commanded by the senior ranking official on board at the time MMCM William F. Remember of FMAG (Fleet Maintenance Assistance Group). On 7 October 1971, she was transferred to the Maritime Administration for berthing with its James River, Virginia, facility. Her name was struck from the Navy List on 1 December 1976. She was subsequently withdrawn from MARAD twice for further stripping, and last returned to MARAD on 21 August 1985. Sold on 27 April 1992, she was scrapped on 25 October 1992.

== Military awards and honors ==
Aucilla earned five battle stars for her World War II service.
