= USS Union (1861) =

Gunboat of the United States Navy

History

United States
- Acquired: 24 April 1861; at Philadelphia, Pennsylvania
- Commissioned: 16 May 1861; at Philadelphia
- Decommissioned: 10 December 1861; at Philadelphia
- Recommissioned: 20 January 1863
- Decommissioned: 29 September 1865; at New York City
- Fate: Sold, 25 October 1865; Burned and sank in merchant service 22 October 1872

General characteristics
- Displacement: 1,114 tons
- Length: 220 feet (67 m)
- Beam: 34 feet (10.4 m)
- Draught: 16 (4.9 m)
- Propulsion: steam engine; screw-propelled
- Speed: 13.5 knots
- Complement: not known
- Armament: one 12-pounder rifled gun

The third USS Union was a heavy (1,114-ton) steamer with a powerful 12-inch rifled gun purchased by the United States Navy during the American Civil War.

Union served the U.S. Navy successfully during the blockade of ports and waterways of the Confederate States of America, capturing numerous blockade runners. Towards war's end, she was also assigned the role of dispatch boat and, because of her large size, of storeship, at the same time continuing to capture blockade runners.

== Commissioned in Philadelphia in 1861 ==
Union, a screw steamer built at Mystic, Connecticut, was chartered by the U.S. Navy on 24 April 1861 at Philadelphia, and was commissioned there on 16 May 1861 with Commander John R. Goldsborough in command.

== Civil War service ==
=== Assigned to the Atlantic Blockade ===
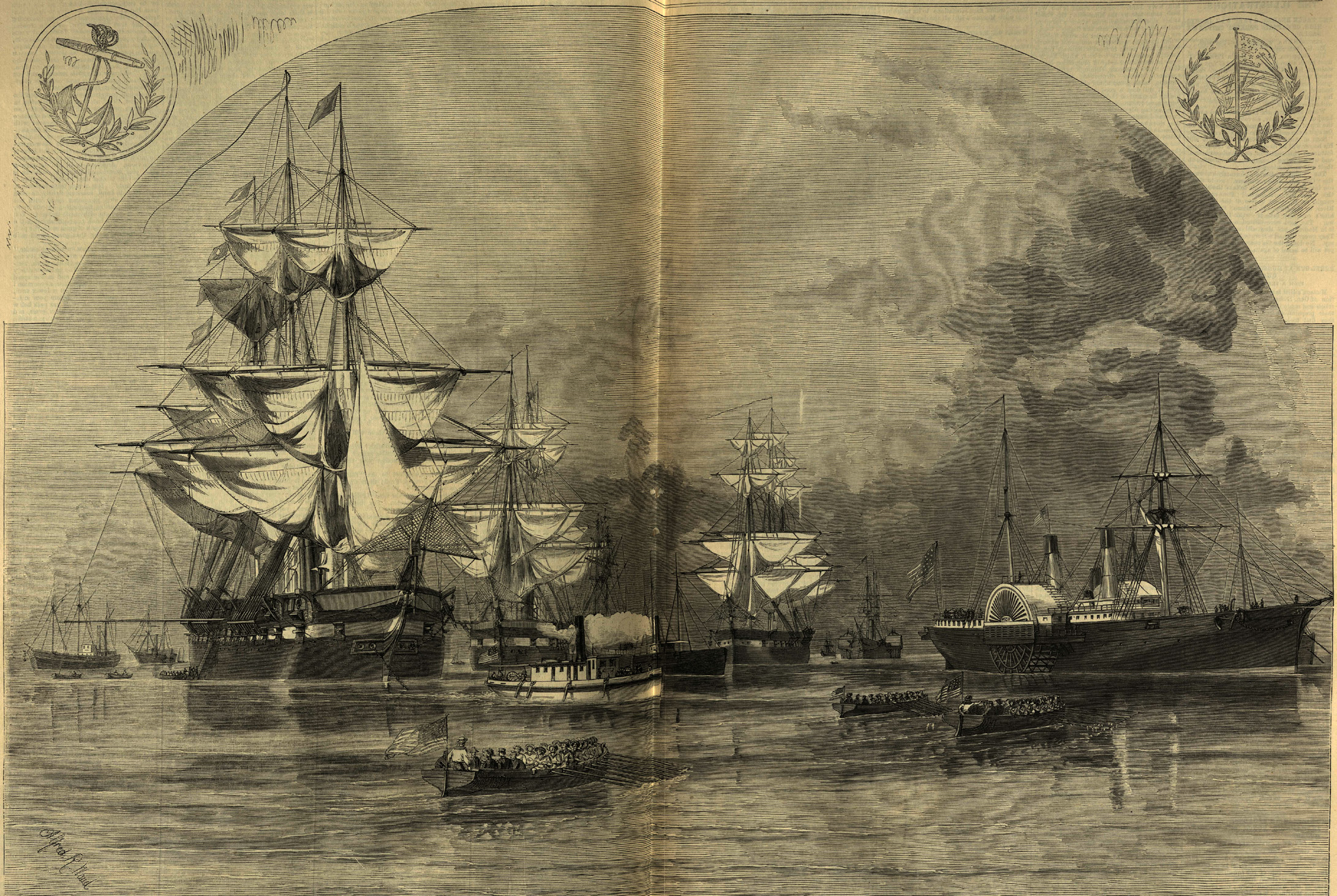
Union with the Blockading Squadron at anchor in Hampton Roads, off Fortress Monroe, New York Illustrated News of 1861

The next day, Union was assigned to the Atlantic Blockading Squadron, and she steamed south to cruise off Charleston, South Carolina, and Savannah, Georgia, on 28 May 1861. However, she soon headed back north and captured the schooner F. W. Johnson at sea off the mouth of the Chesapeake Bay on 1 June 1861. The following morning, she arrived at Hampton Roads, Virginia, with the prize.

After coaling, Union returned to the blockade off Savannah and captured the brig Hallie Jackson there on 10 June 1861. She arrived off Charleston on the morning of 18 June 1861 and, later that day, captured the Confederate blockade runner Amelia. Union sent Amelia north to Philadelphia in the charge of a prize master and delivered the Amelia's crew to Fort Monroe, Virginia, on 23 June 1861.

=== Collision with blockade runner ===
Union left Hampton Roads on 27 June 1861 to rejoin the blockade off Charleston. She sustained considerable damage to her superstructure and rigging in a collision with the Spanish ship Plus Ultra on 2 July 1861. She was temporarily repaired at sea and sailed for Hampton Roads to refuel on 15 July. En route north, Union stopped at Georgetown, South Carolina; Wilmington, North Carolina; Ocracoke Inlet; Hatteras Inlet; and Hatteras Cove in search of blockade runners and reached her destination on 18 July 1861.

Union was next deployed on blockade duty off Cape Hatteras. On 28 July 1861, she found the Union merchant brig B. T. Martin—which had been captured by Confederate privateer York—hard aground north of the cape and destroyed her. Union briefly put into Hampton Roads for coal on 5 August 1861, then immediately returned to blockade duty off Cape Hatteras, where she forced York aground on 9 August 1861. Union returned to Hampton Roads on 14 August 1861 for emergency repairs and put into Baltimore, Maryland, the next day for alterations.

=== Transferred to the Potomac flotilla ===
While undergoing repairs, Union was transferred to the Potomac Flotilla on 16 August 1861. She left Baltimore the next day and arrived in the Potomac River off Aquia Creek, Virginia, on 19 August 1861. She performed routine reconnaissance and dispatch duties on the Potomac River and, despite heavy fire from shore, burned a large Confederate schooner in Dumfries Creek on 11 October 1861. Union suffered no casualties during the action and received special commendation for her daring exploit from the United States Secretary of the Navy, Gideon Welles. The vessel remained on the Potomac until ordered north on 5 December 1861. She was decommissioned at the Philadelphia Navy Yard on 10 December 1861.

=== Recommissioned as a supply and dispatch vessel ===
Union was recommissioned on 20 January 1863 and detailed to the Gulf of Mexico for use as a storeship and dispatch vessel. She spent the remainder of the war operating between New York City; Hampton Roads; Port Royal, South Carolina; and points scattered along the Florida coast and the shore of the Gulf of Mexico.

Union also compiled an impressive list of captures during this time. These included the blockade-running British schooner Linnet, captured on 21 May 1863 west of Charlotte Harbor, Florida, and the British steamer Spaulding, taken off St. Andrew Sound, Georgia, on 11 October 1863. On 14 January 1864, Union seized the steamer Mayflower and her cargo of cotton near Tampa Bay, Florida, and, on 26 April 1864, she captured the schooner O.K. south of the bay. Union's final prize was the sloop Caroline, captured at Jupiter Inlet, Florida, on 10 June 1864.

== Post-war sale and subsequent career ==
Union completed several dispatch and supply missions after the American Civil War ended and was decommissioned at New York City on 29 September 1865. She was sold at auction there to W. H. Starbuck on 25 October 1865 and was re-documented as S.S. Missouri on 8 December 1865. As Missouri, she remained in merchant service until she caught fire and sank in the Bahamas on 22 October 1872, some 25 nautical miles (29 statute miles; 46 km) northeast of Abaco, costing the lives of some 69 persons. Two of those on the voyage killed were, Richard Cecil Cleveland and Lewis Frederick Cleveland, brothers of future US President Grover Cleveland. She was on a voyage from New York City to Nassau, Bahamas. There were twelve survivors.

== See also ==
- Pencil sketch 1860–65 of U.S. Gunboat "Union" from J.P. Morgan collection at the Library of Congress
- Union Navy
- Union Blockade
