= USS Florida (1850) =

Gunboat of the United States Navy

History

United States
- Name: USS Florida
- Acquired: by purchase, 5 October 1861
- Commissioned: 5 October 1861
- Decommissioned: 26 April 1867
- Fate: Sold

General characteristics
- Type: Sidewheel steamer
- Displacement: 1,261 long tons (1,281 t)
- Length: 214 ft (65 m)
- Beam: 35 ft 3 in (10.74 m)
- Draft: 22 ft 3 in (6.78 m)
- Propulsion: Steam engine
- Speed: 13 knots (24 km/h; 15 mph)
- Armament: 8 × 32-pounder guns; 1 × 20-pounder rifle

The second USS Florida was a sidewheel steamer in the United States Navy.

Florida was purchased and commissioned on 5 October 1861, with Lieutenant John R. Goldsborough in command.

Florida stood out of New York Harbor on 19 October 1861 to join the South Atlantic Blockading Squadron in patrolling the coasts of South Carolina, Georgia, and Florida. She helped capture a ship and a schooner who were running the blockade. Returning to New York during November 1862, she was decommissioned for repairs, and was recommissioned 7 March 1863 for service with the North Atlantic Blockading Squadron. She was particularly successful in this assignment, capturing a steamer and a schooner off Wilmington, North Carolina, in June 1863, and aiding the destruction of a number of British steamers used as blockade runners in February 1864, including PS Fanny and Jennie.

Again out of commission for repairs between 12 December 1864 and 26 February 1865, Florida sailed 10 March with supplies for ships on station along the Atlantic coast. She proceeded through the Gulf of Mexico to New Orleans where she embarked Confederate prisoners from the ram CSS Webb, transporting them to New York. Florida weighed anchor again to cruise the Gulf of Mexico until the end of 1865.

On her final voyage, Florida sailed in the West Indies from 4 January 1866 to 8 April 1867. She was placed out of commission for the last time on 26 April 1867 and subsequently sold.
