= Battle of Doro Passage =

1827 naval battle between the U.S. Navy and Greek pirates

- Part of Aegean Anti-Piracy Operation
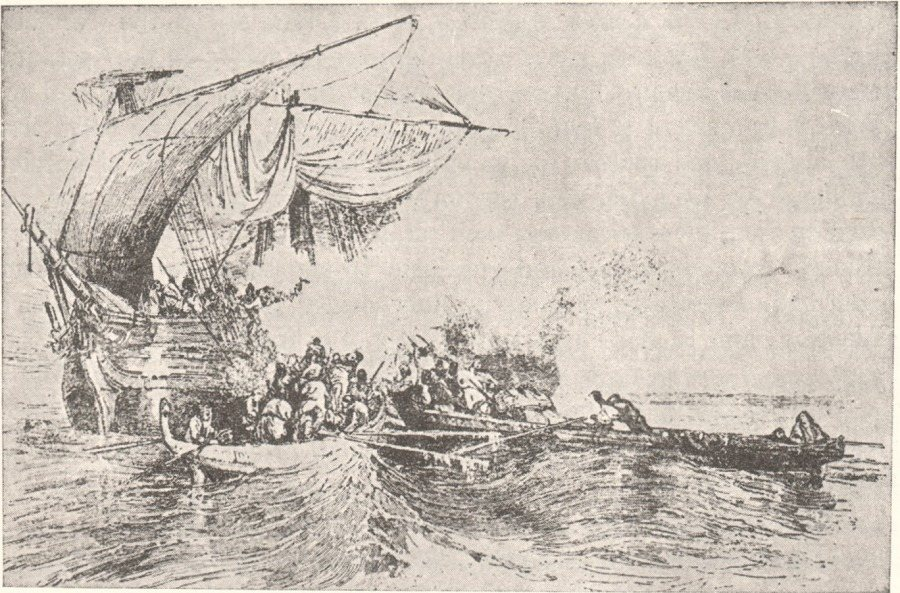
- Greek pirates attacking the British merchant ship Comet
Date	16 October 1827
Location	Doro Passage, Aegean Sea
Result	American forces recover Comet

Belligerents
United States	Greek pirates

Commanders and leaders
Benjamin Cooper; Louis M. Goldsborough	Unknown

Strength
1 schooner	1 brig 5 mistikos

Casualties and losses
Unknown	~85 killed or wounded 1 brig captured
- The British brig was captured by the pirates and liberated by the Americans.

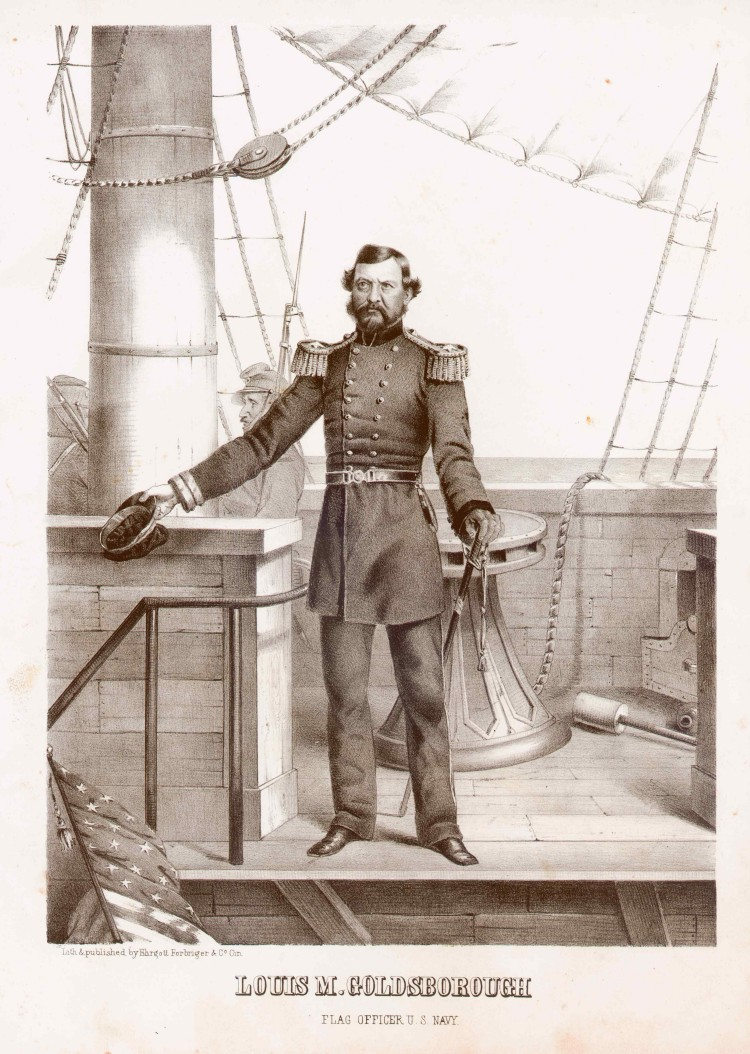
Louis M. Goldsborough

The Battle of Doro Passage was a naval engagement during the United States Navy's operation against Greek pirates in the Aegean Sea. On October 16, 1827 a British merchant ship was attacked by pirates in Doro Passage off the islands of Andros and Negroponte but was retaken by American sailors.

== Battle ==
The Greek War of Independence shifted the balance of sea power in the Mediterranean Sea against the Ottoman Empire. This power shift led to a rise in piracy particularly among the Greek islands in the Aegean. In 1825, after several American merchant ships had been attacked, the American navy sent a squadron of warships to protect American interests and persecute pirates. Lieutenant Benjamin Cooper commanded the twelve-gun schooner USS Porpoise in October 1827 and was in the process of escorting a convoy of five American ships and six others from Smyrna to Malta. At dusk on October 16, the convoy was sailing through Doro Passage when suddenly the wind came to a calm. The British brig Comet had fallen behind and drifted away from the rest of the convoy. She was attacked by 200 to 300 Greek pirates in five boats called mistikos. In general the mistikos were small but fast three masted galleys armed with one bow gun.

The pirates quickly took control of Comet and put most of the crew in chains before attempting to flee back to their islands. The British captain and some crewmen managed to lower a boat and paddle to Porpoise, which was heading back to find Comet after the Americans heard shooting. Lieutenant Conner gave the order to open fire and give chase to the Greek pirates, who were trying to tow Comet away. However, because of the calm, the sailors had to propel their ship by oars. When rowing failed to close the range, Lieutenant Cooper dispatched four boats with thirty-five men under the command of Lieutenant Louis M. Goldsborough. With boats the Americans felt they could close the distance between the two vessels faster and cut out the captured brig. It was now dark, so when the Greeks opened fire on the approaching boats they had trouble hitting their targets. No Americans were hurt throughout the action.

During the boarding a wardroom steward killed eleven of the pirates singlehandedly, Lieutenant John A. Carr killed the pirate leader and several others with his pistol. Ultimately eighty to ninety pirates became casualties and the remaining escaped to shore in their boats. Lieutenant Goldsborough received recognition for winning the largest battle of the American campaign in the Aegean and a message of thanks from the British government.

== See also ==
- Golden Age of Piracy

== Bibliography ==
- "Goldsborough, Louis Malesherbes, Rear-Admiral, U.S.N". A Naval Encyclopædia: Comprising a Dictionary of Nautical Words and Phrases; Biographical Notices, and Records of Naval Officers; Special Articles of Naval Art and Science. Philadelphia: L. R. Hamersly & Co. 1881.
- Wilson, James Grant; John Fiske, eds. (1888). "Goldsborough, Charles". Appletons' Cyclopædia of American Biography. Volume 2: Crane–Grimshaw. New York: D. Appleton and Company.
- Wombwell, A. James (2010). The Long War Against Piracy: Historical Trends. Volume 32 of Occasional Paper. Fort Leavenworth, Kansas: Combat Studies Institute Press. ISBN 978-0-9823283-6-1.
