= USS Goldsborough (DD-188) =

Clemson-class destroyer

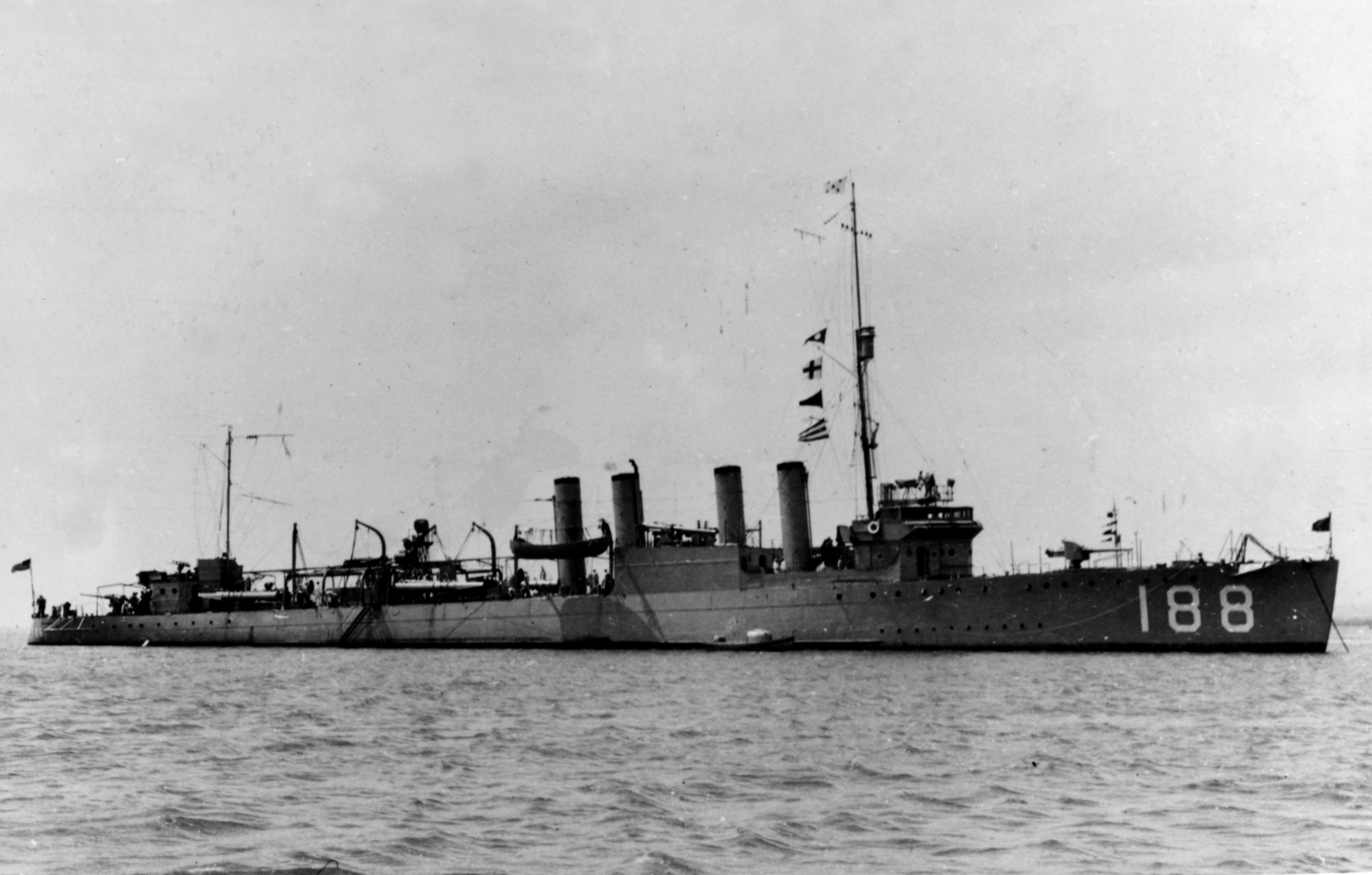
- USS Goldsborough, circa in 1920

History

United States
- Name: Goldsborough
- Namesake: Louis M. Goldsborough
- Builder: Newport News Shipbuilding & Dry Dock Company
- Laid down: 8 June 1918
- Launched: 20 November 1918
- Commissioned: 26 January 1920
- Decommissioned: 14 July 1922
- Reclassified: Small seaplane tender, AVP-18, 15 November 1939
- Recommissioned: 1 July 1940
- Reclassified: Seaplane tender destroyer, AVD-5, 2 August 1940; Destroyer, DD-188, 1 December 1943; High-speed transport, APD-32, 7 March 1944
- Decommissioned: 11 October 1945
- Stricken: 24 October 1945
- Fate: Sold for scrap 21 November 1946

General characteristics
- Class & type: Clemson-class destroyer
- Displacement: 1,215 tons
- Length: 314 ft 5 in (95.83 m)
- Beam: 31 ft 9 in (9.68 m)
- Draft: 9 ft 4 in (2.84 m)
- Propulsion: 26,500 shp (19,800 kW); geared turbines, 2 screws
- Speed: 35 kn (65 km/h; 40 mph)
- Range: 4,900 nmi (9,100 km; 5,600 mi) at 15 kn (28 km/h; 17 mph)
- Complement: 101 officers and enlisted
- Armament: 4 × 4 in (102 mm)/50 cal. guns; 3 × 3 in (76 mm)/23 cal. guns; 12 × 21 inch (533 mm) torpedo tubes

USS Goldsborough (DD-188/AVP-18/AVD-5/APD-32) was a Clemson-class destroyer in the United States Navy during World War II. She was the second Navy ship named for Rear Admiral Louis M. Goldsborough (1805–1877). Entering service in 1920, the ship had a brief active life before being placed in reserve in 1922. Goldsborough was reactivated for World War II and was used as an aircraft tender, destroyer and high speed transport in both Atlantic and Pacific theaters. Following the war, the ship was sold for scrapping in 1946.

== Construction and career ==
Goldsborough was launched on 20 November 1918 by the Newport News Shipbuilding & Dry Dock Company, Newport News, Virginia, sponsored by Miss Lucetta Pennington Goldsborough, the daughter of Rear Admiral Goldsborough. The ship was commissioned at Norfolk, Virginia on 26 January 1920.

Goldsborough joined Division 25, Squadron 3, U.S. Atlantic Fleet, departing Norfolk 25 February 1920 for training at Guantanamo Bay, Cuba, and returning to New York City on 1 May 1920 for maneuvers and tactics off the New England Coast. She stood out of Hampton Roads on 1 September 1920 on a practice cruise in the Gulf of Mexico, returning to Norfolk on 10 October for operations along the seaboard to New York until 5 January 1921 when she sailed to join the combined Battle Fleet off Cuba; thence she steamed through the Panama Canal to Callao, Peru, and back to Guantanamo Bay for further battle practice before return to Norfolk on 27 April. She entered Philadelphia Navy Yard 28 April for inactivation and decommissioned on 14 July 1922. She was redesignated AVP-18 on 15 November 1939. She was converted in the New York Navy Yard, recommissioned 1 July 1940; and redesignated AVD-5 on 2 August 1940.

Goldsborough departed New York on 12 August 1940, to tend amphibious planes on Neutrality Patrol in waters ranging from Puerto Rico, Cuba, and the United States Virgin Islands, to Trinidad, British West Indies. She returned to Norfolk 23 January 1941 for repairs; conducted a cruise to the coast of Mexico and returned (3 March – 3 April), then served the Patrol Wing Support Force, Patrol Squadrons, U.S. Atlantic Fleet, at Naval Station Argentia, Newfoundland; Reykjavík, Iceland; and Gungnat Bay, Greenland. She arrived at Norfolk from Greenland on 13 October 1941 for repairs, and then proceeded to Seamour Bay, Galapagos Islands, arriving 23 December 1941. Here she tended amphibious patrol planes of Patrol Squadron 3, sometimes steaming down the coast of the Americas as far as Valparaíso, Chile, with time-out for service as a simulated target in Panama Bay.

=== World War II ===
The destroyer transited the Panama Canal on 17 June 1942 and entered Trujillo Bay, Honduras, on 21 June with Commander Patrol Squadron 3 embarked to direct operations of the squadron on special patrols in conjunction with other naval units attempting to locate Axis submarine bases. After being contacted by patrol planes, a party from Goldsborough boarded Honduran merchant ship Laguna on 25 June and the Honduran merchant ship Racer the following day. Both were turned over to British authorities at Belize. On 3 July Goldsborough departed Puerta Castilla for Portland Bight, Jamaica. Here she tended aircraft on special patrols in the protection of convoys between Cuba and the Panama Canal. She arrived at the Charleston Navy Yard from Jamaica 2 October 1942 for repairs, followed by gunnery practice in the Chesapeake Bay.

Goldsborough departed Norfolk 30 October 1942 to escort the seaplane tender Pocomoke to Panama and the seaplane tender Albemarle to aviation patrol bases at San Juan, Puerto Rico; Trinidad; and Bermuda, Florida. She returned to Norfolk on 30 November 1942 to spend the following year as escort for Albemarle while carrying men, aeronautical cargo, and aircraft of Fleet Air Wings of the U.S. Atlantic Fleet to Guantanamo Bay; Trinidad; Bermuda; San Juan; and Recife, Brazil. She returned to Norfolk on the last of these missions 5 September 1943. After patrolling with the USS Core antisubmarine warfare task group from 5 October-15 November 1943, Goldsborough was redesignated DD-188 on 1 December 1943.

On 4 December 1943, Goldsborough sailed with the Core task group. Near midnight of 2 January 1944, she made visual contact with a surfaced U-boat off the Azores, fought through heavy seas in an attempt to ram amidships. She just missed the U-boat's stern as it slid under the sea. After two depth charge attacks, Goldsborough lost contact. She then screened Core to Norfolk 18 January and proceeded to New York Navy Yard for voyage repairs. Thereafter, she escorted Aucilla to Trinidad, returning to Norfolk as escort of Nitro then entered the Charleston Navy Yard on 21 February 1944 for conversion to a high-speed transport, and redesignation as APD-32, 7 March 1944.

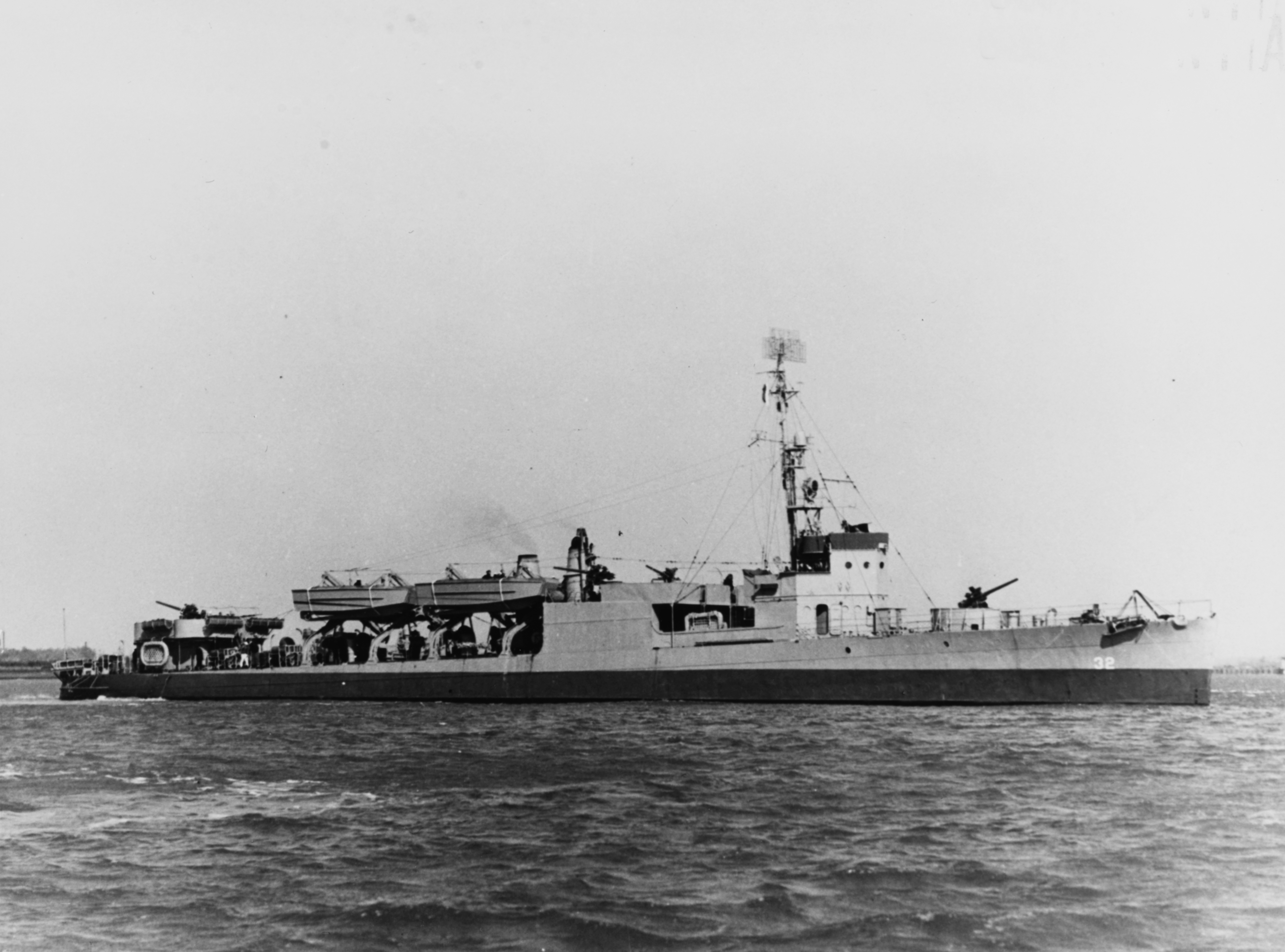
Goldsborough in April 1944.

Goldsborough departed Charleston on 10 April and reached Pearl Harbor, via the Panama Canal and San Diego on 9 May for amphibious assault training in Hanalei and Kawaihae Bay. She sailed on 29 May to rendezvous with a transport force proceeding via Ulithi to arrive off the invasion beaches of Saipan on 15 June 1944. An aerial bomb exploded 400 yards (370 m) to starboard as she assisted in repelling a raid of enemy dive bombers. The following day she landed the 2d Company, 1st Battalion, 2d Marines, just south of Charon Kanoa. During the next 5 weeks she escorted supply and troop convoys between the Marshall Islands and Saipan, taking time out for direct gunfire support of troops on Saipan the nights of 29 June and 7 July. She departed Saipan on 28 July to train Underwater Demolition Team 4 in Hawaiian waters, then joined a Beach Demolition Task Group that sailed from Manus, Admiralty Islands, on 12 October to destroy enemy facilities and installations in the vicinity of the proposed invasion beaches of eastern Leyte as well as on the entrance islands of Leyte Gulf. The afternoon of 18 October 1944 she performed shore bombardment operations into concealed enemy positions at Dulag, covering underwater demolition teams headed for the shore. Two 75 mm (3 in) shells straddled the high speed transport; and a third hit her number one stack, killing 2 and wounding 16 men. She screened the battleships and cruisers, carrying out a bombardment through the night of 19 October and supporting troops that launched the invasion the morning of 20 October 1944. She departed the following day to embark troops at Noemfoor, Schouten Islands, landing them on the beaches at Tolasa, Leyte, on 18 November 1944. She again arrived off Noemfoor on 19 December for transport of troops to Mios Woendi, Padiados Islands, and thence via Morotai with six merchant ships escorted into Leyte Gulf 6 January 1945. Her next assignment was patrolling the entrance of Lingayen Gulf. She dispatched a medical team to damaged destroyer escort Gilligan on 12 January, picked up two survivors, and then defended against a kamikaze which just missed the stern of Seusens before crashing into the sea. Goldsborough continued her patrol in the Gulf and off San Fabian until 18 January 1945.

After voyage repairs at Ulithi, Goldsborough landed troops at Iwo Jima (3–6 March), thence via the Marianas to Tulagi harbor in the Solomons and back to Ulithi, where she joined transports bound for Okinawa. She arrived off Okinawa on 11 April, fought off aerial raids near Hagushi beaches the following day and rescued a Navy fighter pilot whose plane was damaged in aerial combat. She departed Okinawa on 14 April for repairs at Guam, returning on 15 May 1945 to patrol off Hagushi beaches until 31 May. Goldsborough was then routed via the Marianas, Marshalls, and Pearl Harbor to San Pedro, California, where she arrived 1 July 1945.

=== Decommissioning ===
Redesignated again as destroyer (DD-188) on 10 July, she decommissioned there 11 October 1945. Her name was struck from the Navy List 24 October 1945 and she was sold for scrapping 21 November 1946 to Hugo Nuef Corporation, New York City.

Goldsborough received five battle stars for service in World War II.
