= USS Wave (1836) =

Schooner in commission in US navy (1836 - c.1846)

History

United States
- Name: USS Wave
- Namesake: Previous name retained.
- Builder: Brown and Bell, New York, New York
- Completed: 1832
- Acquired: 1836
- Fate: Probably sold in 1846
- Notes: In service as private yacht 1832-1836

General characteristics
- Type: Schooner
- Propulsion: Sail
- Sail plan: Schooner-rigged
- Armament: Reported both as 1 gun or "2 small guns"

USS Wave was a schooner in commission in the United States Navy from 1836 until probably 1846.

Wave was a schooner-rigged yacht designed along pilot boat lines by John C. Stevens and built for him in 1832 at New York City by Brown and Bell. The U.S. Navy purchased her in 1836 for use in the Second Seminole War. In that campaign, she cruised the Florida coast in support of United States Army operations until 1840. After 1840, Wave served as a surveying vessel along the United States East Coast under the command of Lieutenant John R. Goldsborough.

In his History of the American Sailing Navy, Howard I. Chapelle suggests that she was sold in 1846. However, no evidence has been found to corroborate or refute that assertion. Chapelle also states that as of the time of his book's publication in 1949, a model of Wave resided in the New York Yacht Club's model room.
