= Louis M. Goldsborough =

United States Navy admiral (1805–1877)

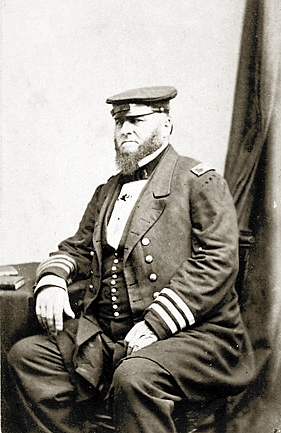
- Born: February 18, 1805; Washington, D.C., U.S.
- Died: February 20, 1877 (aged 72); Washington, D.C., U.S.
- Relatives: John R. Goldsborough (brother)
- Military career
- Allegiance: United States of America; Union
- Branch: United States Navy
- Service years: 1812–1873
- Rank: Rear admiral
- Nickname: "Old Guts"
- Commands: Brazil Squadron; North Atlantic Blockading Squadron; European Squadron
- Conflicts: Aegean Campaign: Battle of Doro Passage; Seminole Wars Mexican War: Siege of Veracruz; American Civil War: Battle of Hatteras Inlet Batteries; Battle of Roanoke Island; Battle of Elizabeth City; Battle of New Berne; Battle of Fort Macon; Peninsula Campaign
- Other work: Superintendent of the U.S. Naval Academy

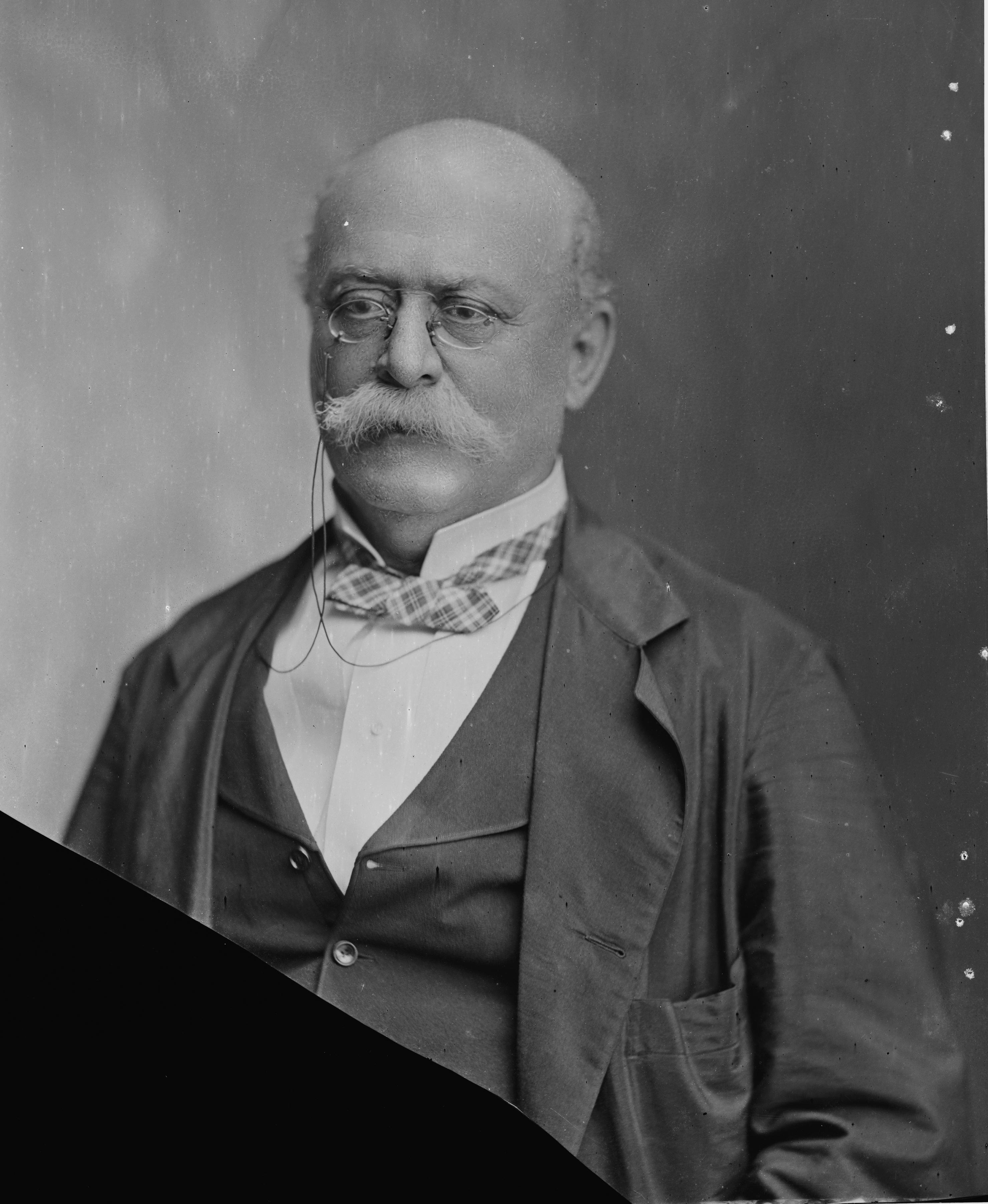
Louis M. Goldsborough

Louis Malesherbes Goldsborough (February 18, 1805 – February 20, 1877) was a rear admiral in the United States Navy during the American Civil War. He held several sea commands during the Civil War, including that of the North Atlantic Blockading Squadron. He was also noted for contributions to nautical scientific research.

His younger brother, John R. Goldsborough, was also a U.S. Navy officer who served during the Civil War and who later became a commodore.

== Biography ==
Louis Malesherbes Goldsborough was born in Washington, D.C., in 1805, the son of a chief clerk at the United States Department of the Navy. He was appointed midshipman in the United States Navy by Secretary of the Navy Paul Hamilton on June 28, 1812. At the time of his appointment, he was seven years old, and Goldsborough did not actually begin serving until February 13, 1816, when he reported for duty at the Washington Navy Yard.

In 1831 Goldsborough married Elizabeth Wirt, daughter of William Wirt, U.S. Attorney General from 1817 to 1829. Together, they had three children: William, Louis, and Elizabeth.

In 1833, after helping lead German emigrants to Wirt's Estates near Monticello, Florida, Goldsborough took leave from the Navy to command a steamboat expedition, and later mounted volunteers in the Seminole War.

== Naval service ==
During the Aegean Anti-Piracy Campaign, Goldsborough led a four-boat night expedition from Porpoise in October 1827 to rescue British merchant brig Comet from Mediterranean pirates. In 1830 he was appointed first officer in charge of the newly created Depot of Charts and Instruments at Washington, the crude beginning of the United States Hydrographic Office. Goldsborough suggested creation of the depot and initiated the collection and centralization of the instruments, books and charts that were scattered among several Navy yards. After two years he was relieved by Lieutenant Charles Wilkes.

After cruising the Pacific in the frigate United States, he participated in the bombardment of Veracruz in Ohio during the Mexican–American War. He served consecutively as: commander of a detachment in the expedition against Tuxpan; senior officer of a commission which explored California and Oregon (1849–1850); superintendent of the United States Naval Academy (1853–1857); and commander of the Brazil Squadron (1859–1861).

=== Civil War service ===
Goldsborough was given command of the Atlantic Blockading Squadron in September 1861, relieving Flag Officer Silas H. Stringham. In October of that year the Atlantic squadron was split into the North Atlantic Blockading Squadron and South Atlantic Blockading Squadron; Goldsborough took command of the North squadron, and Flag Officer Samuel Francis DuPont assumed command of the South squadron. On January 3, 1862, both officers were promoted to the newly created rank of Flag Officer (equivalent to the rank of Commodore which would be created 5 months later). During his command of the North Atlantic Blockading Squadron, which he commanded from its inception to September 1862, he led his fleet off North Carolina, where in cooperation with troops under General Ambrose Burnside, he captured Roanoke Island and destroyed a small Confederate fleet.

==== Peninsula campaign ====
After aiding the capture of Roanoke Island, Goldsborough and his command were sent to Hampton Roads at the request of Major General George B. McClellan to help protect Union forces landing on the Virginia Peninsula at the start of the Peninsula Campaign. Goldsborough refused to be placed under McClellan's direct command, telling Assistant Secretary of the Navy Gustavus Vasa Fox that he would instead cooperate with McClellan. After sending six of his vessels to attack the Gloucester Point batteries, Goldsborough withdrew them, saying the area was too dangerous for his ships—even though none of them sustained any damage—and fearful of a return appearance by CSS Virginia, which had laid waste to a Union naval force in Hampton Roads while Goldsborough was at Roanoke Island.

At the start of the Seven Days Battles, Goldsborough was asked again, this time by President Abraham Lincoln, to come to McClellan's aid. Goldsborough continued to hold back his fleet, forcing Lincoln to accept a recommendation by Secretary of the Navy Gideon Welles to detach ships under Goldsborough's command and place them under Commodore Charles Wilkes, who as a lieutenant had relieved Goldsborough at the Depot of Charts and Instruments (see above), and who would report directly to Welles. This move, coupled with newspaper accounts critical of the Navy, so seriously hurt Goldsborough that he requested that he be relieved. He was promoted to rear admiral in August 1862, and in September passed command of the squadron to Acting Rear Admiral Samuel Phillips Lee. Goldsborough would finish the war performing administrative duties in Washington, D.C.

== Post-Civil War service and death ==
In June 1865, Goldsborough became the first commander of the European Squadron, formerly the Mediterranean Squadron. In 1868, Goldsborough returned to Washington and took command of the Washington Navy Yard, a position he held until he retired in 1873.

Rear Admiral Louis M. Goldsborough died in Washington, D.C., on February 20, 1877.

== Dates of rank ==
- Midshipman – June 18, 1812
- Lieutenant – January 13, 1825
- Commander – September 8, 1841
- Captain – September 14, 1855
- Flag Officer – January 3, 1862
- Rear Admiral – July 16, 1862
- Retired List – October 6, 1873
- Died – February 20, 1877

== Namesakes ==
His son, Louis M. Goldsborough, Jr. (1839-1863), was a lieutenant in the U.S. Marines during the Civil War, until his death from illness in 1863. The United States Navy has named three ships USS Goldsborough in honor of Admiral Goldsborough.

== See also ==
- List of superintendents of the United States Naval Academy

Academic offices
Preceded by Cornelius K. Stribling	Superintendent of United States Naval Academy; 1853-1857	Succeeded by George S. Blake
