= USS Porpoise (1820) =

Schooner

History

United States
- Name: USS Porpoise
- Builder: Portsmouth Navy Yard
- Launched: 1820
- Fate: Sunk, 1833

General characteristics
- Type: Schooner
- Displacement: 177 long tons (180 t)
- Length: 86 ft (26 m)
- Beam: 24 ft 7 in (7.49 m)
- Depth: 10 ft 4 in (3.15 m)
- Propulsion: Sail
- Armament: 12 × 6-pounder guns

The first USS Porpoise was a topsail schooner in the United States Navy.

Porpoise was built in 1820 at the Portsmouth Navy Yard, Kittery, Maine. The schooners Alligator, Dolphin, and Shark were her sister ships.

She first cruised in the West Indies in 1821–1823, Lieutenant James Ramage in command, hunting pirates.

Cruising the West African coast in 1824–25, the schooner engaged in the suppression of the slave trade. Late in 1825, she returned to the United States and, under Commander Foxhall A. Parker, Sr., cruised off the northeast coast of the United States.

Porpoise cruised the Mediterranean from 1826 until 1830 under the command of Lts. Benjamin Cooper, John H. Bell, and Thomas M. Newell successively. During this time she participated in the Battle of Doro Passage where she dispatched boats under the command of Lieutenant Louis M. Goldsborough to recapture the British brig Comet from pirates. Returning to the West Indies in 1830, she sailed under Lts. John Percival, James Armstrong, and James McIntosh.

While cruising in the West Indies in 1833 under the command of Lt. William Taylor, Porpoise was wrecked on a reef off Point Lizardo.
