= USS Warren (1827) =

Gunboat of the United States Navy

History

United States
- Name: USS Warren
- Namesake: Joseph Warren
- Builder: Boston Navy Yard
- Laid down: 1825
- Launched: 29 November 1826.
- Commissioned: 14 January 1827
- Decommissioned: 24 May 1859
- Fate: Sold, 1 January 1863

General characteristics
- Type: Sloop of war
- Tonnage: 697
- Length: 127 ft (39 m)
- Beam: 33 ft 9 in (10.29 m)
- Depth: 15 ft 6 in (4.72 m)
- Propulsion: Sail
- Complement: 190 officers and enlisted
- Armament: 20 × 32-pounder guns

The fourth USS Warren was a second-class sloop-of-war in the United States Navy.

Warren was built at the Boston Navy Yard between 1825 and 1826 and was commissioned at her builders on 14 January 1827, Master Commandant Lawrence Kearny in command. She was named after Founding Father and Revolutionary War hero Joseph Warren.

== Service history ==
=== Mediterranean Squadron ===
Warren sailed for the Mediterranean on 22 February 1827 to stop Greek-flag pirates from victimizing American merchantmen. Unsettled conditions in the Near East and the Greek fight for independence had resulted in some excesses against third parties, notably American flag merchantmen. The piracy caused the American Mediterranean Squadron to establish a regular convoy system from Malta to Smyrna.

Warren sailed with a convoy of American vessels on 25 September 1827 and separated from them some 200 miles west of Kythira. On 4 October, Kearny's command bagged her first "piratical boat" and its crew of five. Later that same day, Warren captured a brig "peerced (sic) for 16 guns" flying the Greek flag. For the next three weeks, Warren cruised between Cape Matapan and Carabusa, touching occasionally to contact outward-bound American merchantmen.

While off Milos on 25 October, Kearny learned of recent pirate attacks on the American ships Cherub and Rob Roy. That same day, Warren chased a 10-gun pirate brig ashore on the island of Kimolos, but the brigands escaped to the nearby hills. Warren's men cut away the masts of the erstwhile pirate ship and stripped them of their sails, leaving the rigging submerged in the waters offshore.

Three days later, Warren came across Cherub and took possession of her. That evening, the brig Lexington arrived and assumed protective guard over Cherub while Warren returned to the pirate hunt. The next day, between Tinos and Mykonos, Warren fell in with the Austrian brig Silence, "robbed of everything." The American sloop-of-war towed Silence to Syros, where she left her in the care of Lexington.

Cruising around the island of Mykonos, Warren captured a large tratta "capable of rowing 40 oars," before she put into Mykonos harbor on 1 November. The following day, Kearny and his men recovered sails and some property taken from Cherub, as well as two cases of opium taken from the brig Rob Roy, and the sails and rigging from Silence. The local inhabitants turned over four men accused of being pirates while a landing party of Warren men picked up a fifth man from the mountains. Kearny and his men also took possession of a boat belonging to pirates living at Mykonos and later burned it.

Returning to Syros on the 7th, Kearny restored the goods to Cherub, as well as the sails and rigging from the Austrian ship. Cherub, escorted by Lexington, set sail for Smyrna. That evening, Warren put to sea, bound for the reputed pirate lair on the island of Andros.

A boat expedition, led by Lieutenant William L. Hudson, departed the ship to circle Andros Island. While Hudson's party was thus engaged, a brig with a convoy of some 20 to 30 boats opened fire on them in the darkness. Although the shot went through the sails of Warren's boats and the clothing of some of her sailors, no one was hurt. After this action, which probably occurred because he and his expedition had been mistaken for pirates, Hudson continued, undaunted. Near the south end of the town of Andros, Warren's men brought out one "piratical craft" and burned another in a small bay nearby. At the head of that bay, the American sailors blew up a house believed to have been owned by a pirate and raised and took possession of a boat which pirates had sunk to avoid detection by the Americans. Rob Roy's master later identified the boat as the craft in which pirates had attacked his vessel.

Kearny, in Warren, remained in the vicinity of Andros and Gioura until 14 November. The people of Andros again cooperated and produced a pirate boat which contained a 12-pound carronade and some tools from Cherub.

Four days later, Warren made port at Milos and tarried there into late November. On the 27th of that month, the American brig Sarah and Esther, along with six other vessels, arrived. Three days later, that convoy sailed for Smyrna under Warren's protection. They arrived at their destination, without incident, on 6 December.

For the next two years, Warren remained in the western Mediterranean guarding American commerce.

=== Brazil Station ===
She returned to the United States in the summer of 1830, arriving at Norfolk, Virginia, on 30 August. Decommissioned for repairs, on 10 September, Warren was recommissioned on 2 September 1831, with Master Commandant Benjamin Cooper in command, for service on the Brazil Station. After two years in the South Atlantic, the sloop-of-war headed northward and reached Philadelphia, Pennsylvania, on 31 October 1833.

=== Caribbean ===
Warren then made three successive tours in the West Indies, protecting American commerce in deployments that began in 1836 with the West Indies Squadron and with the Home Squadron in 1839 and 1841. On 19 October 1843, Warren sailed for service with the Pacific Squadron and remained on the western coast of the North American continent for the remainder of her naval career.

=== Pacific ===
During the war with Mexico, Warren acted as a guardship at Monterey, California, and eventually moved to San Francisco for duty as a store and receiving ship. On 13 November 1846, the former sloop-of-war's launch, in charge of Acting Master William H. Montgomery, departed the ship with $900.00 to pay bills accrued by the Navy for supplies, bound for Sutter's Fort, up the Sacramento River. By the end of the month, when no word came from the launch's crew, Warren's commanding officer felt "great anxiety" and sent out a hired boat with some men from his ship to hunt for the missing craft and its crew. On 18 December, the search party – having combed the river and inlets as far as Fort Sacramento—returned and reported finding no sign of the launch or the crew.

Eventually, the fate of Warren's launch came to light. The officers had been murdered—their throats cut—and their bodies thrown overboard. The men divided the money and split up, some returning overland across the North American continent to the east; others remained in California to pan for "washing gold." Records do not indicate whether or not the guilty men were ever found and brought to trial. However, they do show that orders were issued that valid discharges were to be displayed by all naval personnel returning overland to prove that they were not deserters.

The log of the whaleship Niantic records that the "US Sloop of War Warren" rendered immediate assistance on 9 July 1849 in San Francisco harbor, when two of Niantic's crew assaulted her captain with a knife.

Thereafter, Warren was solely a store ship. She was sold in Panama on 1 January 1863. Her eventual fate is unrecorded, although records indicate that the erstwhile sloop-of-war was used as a coal hulk by the Pacific Mail Steamship Company as late as 1874.

== See also ==
- Union Navy
