= List of colonial governors of New Jersey =

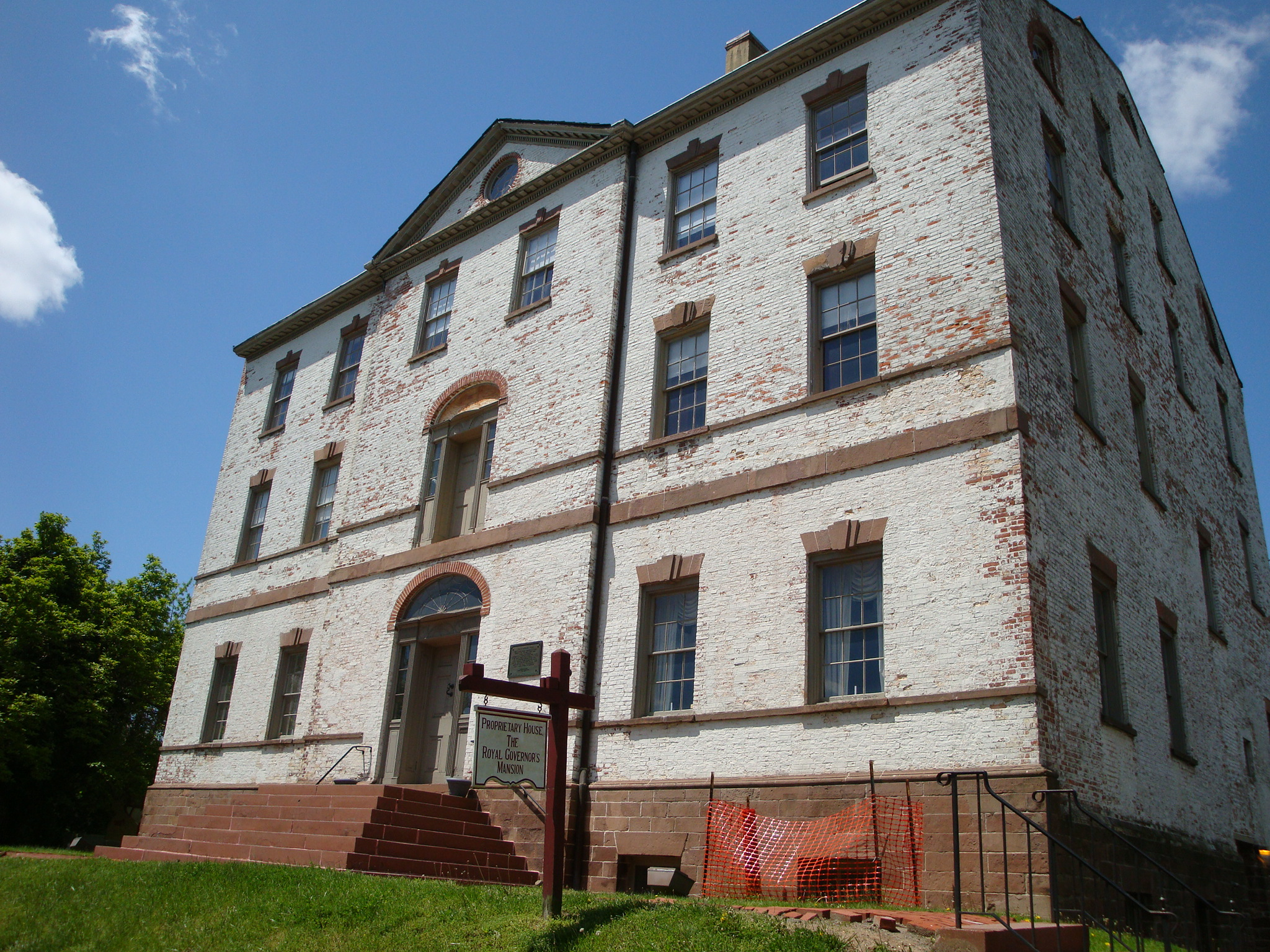
The Proprietary House (built 1762–64) in Perth Amboy, was the last residence for a Royal Governor of New Jersey. It is the only Provincial Governor's Mansion from the Thirteen Colonies that is still standing.

The territory which would later become the state of New Jersey was settled by Dutch and Swedish colonists in the early seventeenth century. In 1664, at the onset of the Second Anglo-Dutch War, English forces under Richard Nicolls ousted the Dutch from control of New Netherland (present-day New York, New Jersey, and Delaware), and the territory was divided into several newly defined English colonies. Despite one brief year when the Dutch retook the colony (1673–74), New Jersey would remain an English possession until the American colonies declared independence in 1776.

In 1664, James, Duke of York (later King James II) divided New Jersey, granting a portion to two men, Sir George Carteret and John Berkeley, 1st Baron Berkeley of Stratton, who supported the monarchy's cause during the English Civil War (1642–49) and Interregnum (1649–60). Carteret and Berkeley subsequently sold their interests to two groups of proprietors, thus creating two provinces: East Jersey and the West Jersey. The exact location of the border between West Jersey and East Jersey was often a matter of dispute. The two provinces would be distinct political divisions from 1674 to 1702.

West Jersey was largely a Quaker colony due to the influence of Pennsylvania founder William Penn and its prominent Quaker investors. Many of its early settlers were Quakers who came directly from England, Scotland, and Ireland to escape religious persecution. Although a number of the East Jersey proprietors in England were Quakers and First Governor Robert Barclay of Aberdeenshire Scotland (Ury served by proxy) was a leading Quaker theologian, the Quaker influence on the East Jersey government was insignificant. Many of East Jersey's early settlers came from other colonies in the Western Hemisphere, especially New England, Long Island, and the West Indies. Elizabethtown and Newark in particular had a strong Puritan character. East Jersey's Monmouth Tract, south of the Raritan River, was developed primarily by Quakers from Long Island.

In 1702, both divisions of New Jersey were reunited as one royal colony by Queen Anne with a royal governor appointed by the Crown. Until 1738, this Province of New Jersey shared its royal governor with the neighboring Province of New York. The Province of New Jersey was governed by appointed governors until 1776. William Franklin, the province's last royal governor before the American Revolution (1775–83), was marginalized in the last year of his tenure, as the province was run de facto by the Provincial Congress of New Jersey. In June 1776, the Provincial Congress formally deposed Franklin and had him arrested, adopted a state constitution, and reorganized the province into an independent state. The constitution granted the vote to all inhabitants who had a certain level of wealth, including single women and blacks (until 1807). The newly formed State of New Jersey elected William Livingston as its first governor on 31 August 1776—a position to which he would be reelected until his death in 1790. New Jersey was one of the original Thirteen Colonies, and was the third colony to ratify the constitution forming the United States of America. It thereby was admitted into the new federation as a state on 18 December 1787. On 20 November 1789 New Jersey became the first state to ratify the Bill of Rights.

== Before English control ==
=== Directors of New Netherland (1624–64) ===
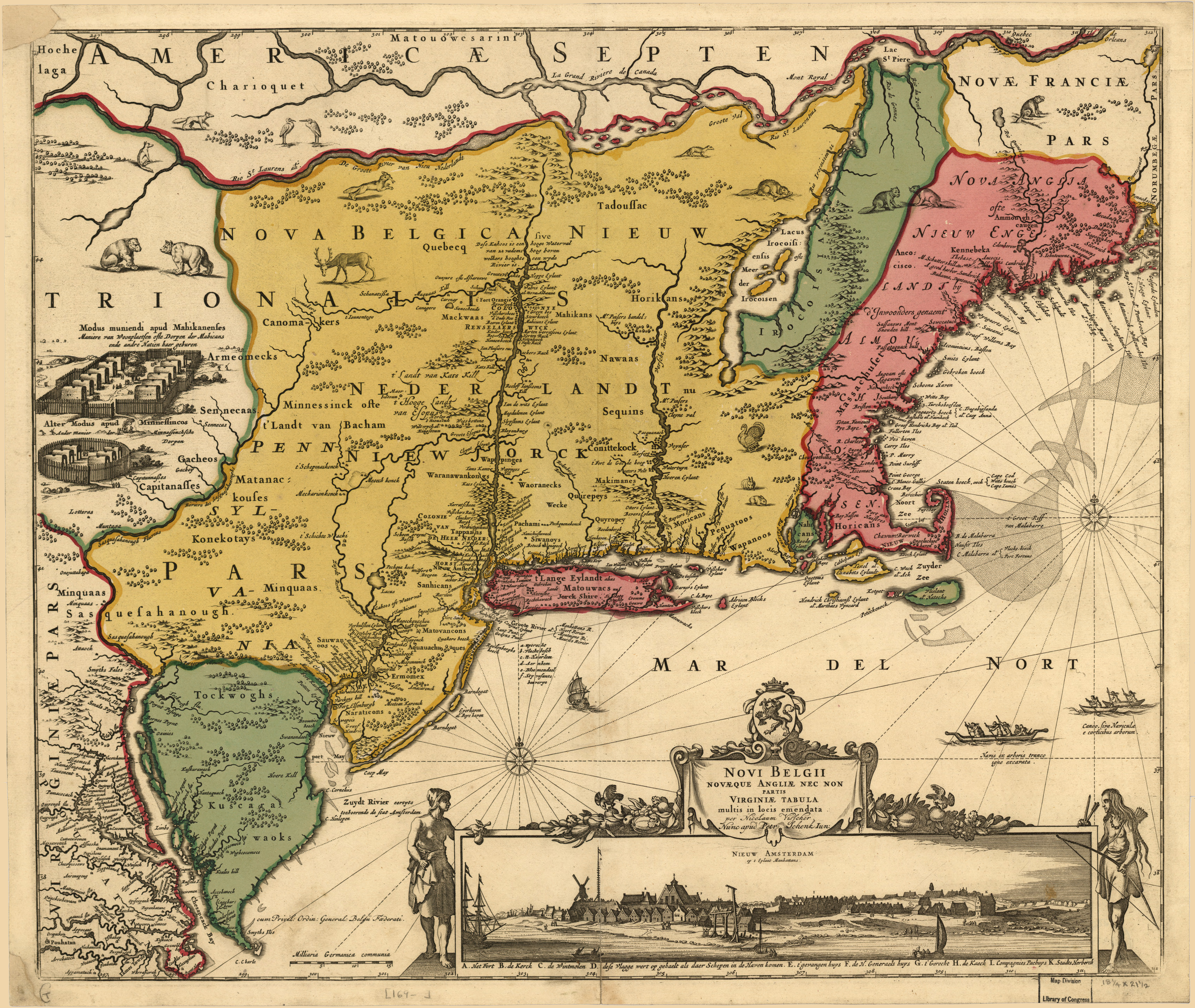
A 1685 reprint of the 1650 map Novi Belgii Novæque Angliæ showing Virginia, New Netherland, and New England

New Netherland (Dutch: Nieuw-Nederland) was the seventeenth-century colonial province of the Republic of the Seven United Netherlands and the Dutch West India Company. It claimed territories along the eastern coast of North America from the Delmarva Peninsula to southwestern Cape Cod. Settled areas of New Netherland now constitute the states of New York, New Jersey, Delaware, and Connecticut as well as parts of Pennsylvania and Rhode Island. The provincial capital New Amsterdam was located at the southern tip of the island of Manhattan at Upper New York Bay.

New Netherland was conceived as a private business venture to exploit the North American fur trade. By the 1650s, the colony experienced dramatic growth and became a major port for trade in the North Atlantic. The leader of the Dutch colony was known by the title Director or Director-General. On 27 August 1664, four English frigates commanded by Richard Nicolls sailed into New Amsterdam's harbor and demanded the surrender of New Netherland. This event sparked the Second Anglo-Dutch War, which led to the transfer of the territory to England per the Treaty of Breda.

Portrait	Director or Director-General	Took office	Left office	Notes
—	Cornelius Jacobsen May (fl. 1600s)	1624	1625	Explored Delaware Bay, New York Bay, North River (Hudson River); Planted settlements at Nut Island (Noten Eylant)—now Governor's Island in New York Harbor—and High Island (Hooghe Eylant) on Delaware River; Cape May was named in his honor
—	Willem Verhulst (or van der Hulst) (fl. 1600s)	1625	1626	Initiated construction of Fort Amsterdam on southern tip of Manhattan Island, and Fort Wilhelmus on the Delaware River; Unpopular with the colonists, he was quickly replaced
Portrait of Peter Minuit	Peter Minuit (1580–1638)	1626	1631	Purchased the island of Manhattan from Native Americans on 24 May 1626; Initiated construction of Fort Nassau on Delaware
—	Sebastiaen Jansen Krol (also known as Bastian Krol) (1595–1674)	1632	1633	—
portrait of Wouter van Twiller by Washington Allston	Wouter van Twiller (1606–54)	1633	1638	Previously a Dutch West India Company warehouse clerk, used family connections to the Rensselaer family to gain appointment; purchased Nut Island (Noten Eylant)—now Governor's Island—from Canarsee tribe for two axeheads, a string of beads, and iron nails; Lost the colony's claim of the Connecticut River valley to New England settlers; Pushed back encroaching Virginia settlers who tried to settle Delaware River valley
—	Willem Kieft (1597–1647)	1638	1647	Attempted to drive out Lenape tribe; Attacks on Pavonia and Corlears Hook, led to Kieft's War; Fired by the Dutch West India Company in 1647; Died at sea near Swansea, Wales, on 27 September 1647 while returning to Amsterdam aboard the Princess Amelia
Portrait of Peter Stuyvesant	Peter Stuyvesant (c.1612–72)	1647	1664	Pavonia, New Amsterdam and other settlements attacked by the Lenape during the brief Peach War (1655); Authorized charter for Communipaw and Bergen (now Jersey City) in 1660; obtained victory in the Esopus Wars against the Esopus; Surrendered New Netherland to the British; Also the Director of Curaçao (1642–64)

=== Governors of New Sweden (1638–55) ===
The relative locations of New Netherland (magenta) and New Sweden (blue) in eastern North America

New Sweden (Swedish: Nya Sverige) was a Swedish colony along the Delaware River from 1638 to 1655 that included territory in present-day Delaware, New Jersey, and Pennsylvania. After being dismissed as director of New Netherland by the Dutch West India Company (WIC), Peter Minuit was recruited by Willem Usselincx, Samuel Blommaert and the Swedish government to create the first Swedish colony in the New World. The Swedes sought to expand their influence by creating an agricultural (tobacco) and fur-trading colony, and thus bypassing French and English merchants.

The New Sweden Company was chartered and included Swedish, Finnish, Dutch, and German stockholders. Minuit and his company arrived on the Fogel Grip and Kalmar Nyckel at Swedes' Landing (now Wilmington, Delaware) in the spring of 1638. Willem Kieft, Director of New Netherland, objected to the Swedish presence, but Minuit ignored his protests knowing that the Dutch were militarily impotent. The colony would establish Fort Nya Elfsborg, near present-day Salem, New Jersey, in 1643.

In May 1654, Swedish militia captured the Fort Casimir, a Dutch defense located near present-day New Castle, Delaware. As a reprisal, the Dutch Director-General Peter Stuyvesant sent an army to the Delaware River, which compelled the surrender of the Swedish forts and settlements in 1655. The Swedish settlers continued to enjoy local autonomy, retaining their own militia, religion, court, and lands, however, until the English conquest of the New Netherland colony on 24 June 1664.

Portrait	Governor	Took office	Left office	Notes
Portrait of Peter Minuit	Peter Minuit (1580–1638)	1638	1638	Arrived to settle the colony in March 1638 and embarked on return voyage to Sweden in June to organize a second group of settlers; Minuit died during a hurricane in the Caribbean in August 1638
—	Måns Nilsson Kling (fl. 1600s)	1638	1640	Served as lieutenant, and later captain, until Sweden appointed a new governor
—	Peter Hollander Ridder (1608–92)	1640	1643	Officer in the Swedish Navy
Portrait of Johan Björnsson Printz	Johan Björnsson Printz (1592–1663)	1643	1653	Ordered construction of Fort Nya Elfsborg and Fort Nya Gothenborg on the Delaware River
—	Johan Papegoja (d. 1667)	1653	1654	Printz's son-in-law, married to Armegot Printz; was left in charge when Governor Printz returned to Sweden
—	Johan Classon Risingh (1617–72)	1654	1655	Defeated by forces led by Peter Stuyvesant, re-asserting New Netherland's claim to Delaware Valley

=== The New Albion Colony (1634–49) ===
Sir Edmund Plowden (1590–1659)

In 1634, Charles I of England granted a charter to Sir Edmund Plowden, to establish a colony in North America north of lands granted to Lord Baltimore for the Maryland colony in 1633. The charter empowered Plowden to assume the title Lord Earl Palatinate, Governor and Captain-General of the Province of New Albion in North America, and poorly defined the boundaries of the New Albion colony. It is believed that the colony would have covered territory within present-day New Jersey, New York, Delaware, and Maryland.

Captain Thomas Young and his nephew, Robert Evelyn, explored and charted the valley of the Delaware River (which they called the Charles River) in the 1630s. Plowden took several years to raise funds, and recruit settlers and "adventurers." In 1642, Plowden and several men sailed from England with aim to settle the colony. This attempt ended in an unsuccessful mutiny, and for the next seven years Plowden remained in Virginia managing the affairs of the intended colony, and selling land rights to adventurers and speculators.

Plowden returned to England in 1649 to raise funds, and promote the colony as a refuge for Roman Catholics exiled during the English Civil War. Despite further attempts to return to his colony, Plowden was confined in a debtors prison and died a pauper in 1659. A notation on John Farrar's 1651 map of Virginia references Plowden's patent for the colony, and labels the Delaware River as "this river the Lord Ployden hath a patten of and calls it New Albion but the Swedes are planted in it and have a great trade of Furrs."

== As an English proprietary colony (1664–1702) ==
The two Lords Proprietor of the Province of New Jersey: John Berkeley, 1st Baron Berkeley of Stratton (left) and Sir George Carteret (right)

=== Governors under the Lords Proprietor (1664–73) ===
With the 1664 surrender of New Netherland by Peter Stuyvesant, and under the authority and instruction of James, Duke of York, Richard Nicolls assumed the position as Deputy-Governor of New Netherland (including Dutch settlements in New Jersey). His first acts were to guarantee the Dutch colonists their property rights and religious freedom. Nicolls implemented the English common law and a legal code. Nicholls would remain governor until 1668, but the Duke of York granted part of the New Netherland territory (that between the Hudson and Delaware rivers, present day New Jersey), to Sir George Carteret and John Berkeley for their devoted service to the Duke of York and his brother Charles II during the English Civil War.

This territory would be called the Province of New Caesaria, or New Jersey after Jersey in the English Channel—one of the last strongholds of the Royalist forces in the English Civil War. (see Name of Jersey) As a result of this grant, Carteret and Berkeley became the two English Lords Proprietor of New Jersey. By the 1665 Concession and Agreement, the Lords Proprietor outlined the distribution of power in the province, offered religious freedom to all inhabitants, and established a system of quit-rents, annual fees paid by settlers in return for land. The two Lords Proprietor selected Carteret's brother Philip as the province's first governor.

Portrait	Governor	Took office	Left office	Notes
—	Richard Nicolls (1624–72)	1664	1665	After the Dutch surrender, Nicolls assumed position of Deputy-Governor of New Amsterdam and New Netherland; Issued two land grants—the Elizabethtown Tract and the Monmouth (or Navesink) Tract—to settlers in 1665
—	Philip Carteret (1639–82)	1665	1672	Appointed by Sir George Carteret (his brother) and Lord Berkeley of Stratton to be the first governor of New Jersey
—	John Berry (1635–89/90)	1672	1673	Carteret left for England in 1672 and left his deputy, Captain Berry, to administer the colony; Term ended with the Dutch capture of "New York" in 1673

=== Restoration of New Netherland (1673–74) ===
In 1673, during the Third Anglo-Dutch War, the Dutch were able to recapture New Amsterdam (renamed "New York" by the English) under Admiral Cornelis Evertsen the Youngest and Captain Anthony Colve. Evertsen had renamed the city "New Orange". Evertsen returned to the Netherlands in July 1674, and was accused of disobeying his orders. Evertsen had been instructed not to retake New Amsterdam, but instead, to conquer the English and French colonies of Saint Helena and Cayenne (now French Guiana). In 1674, the Dutch agreed to relinquish New Orange to the English in exchange for Suriname under the terms of the Second Treaty of Westminster.

Portrait	Governor	Took office	Left office	Notes
—	Anthony Colve (1644-1693)	1673	1674	Colve's authority ended on 10 November 1674 with the transfer of power to Edmund Andros on the basis of the Treaty of Westminster, which restored the colony to the English.

=== East and West Jerseys (1674–1702) ===
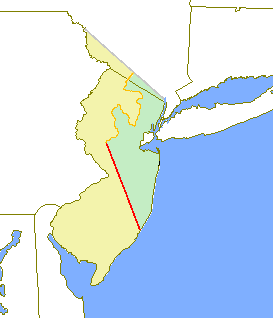
The provinces of West Jersey and East Jersey are shown in yellow and green respectively, as divided by the Keith Line (in red) and the compromise Coxe and Barclay line (in orange)

After the British regained New Jersey and New York, New Jersey was restored as a proprietary colony and was divided into two provinces—East Jersey and West Jersey. In 1674, Berkeley sold his interest in West Jersey to Edward Byllynge and John Fenwick (1618–83). Fenwick rushed to the colony to establish a settlement, Fenwick's Colony, that would become Salem. Due to Byllynge's financial difficulties encountered in his attempts to assert his title to the colony, he sought investment from William Penn, and others. Title issues were settled in 1676 with the negotiation of the Quintipartite Deed between Carteret, Penn, Byllynge, Nicholas Lucas, and Gawen Lawrie dividing the colony into East and West Jersey. West Jersey was largely a Quaker venture focused on the settlement of the lower Delaware River area, and was associated with William Penn and prominent figures in the colonization of the Pennsylvania. After Carteret's death, his heirs sold his interest in East Jersey to twelve investors, eleven of whom were members of the Religious Society of Friends (Quakers), who asked the Quaker apologist Robert Barclay to serve as governor. The settlement of East Jersey, and its commercial and political development was chiefly connected to New England and New York.

This arrangement lasted for approximately thirty years, but because of issues of administration, the proprietors of both colonies surrendered their right to government to Queen Anne. On 17 April 1702, New Jersey was transformed into a crown colony. The proprietors would retain their land rights until the East Jersey proprietors dissolved their corporation (then New Jersey's oldest) in 1998. The West Jersey Proprietors, currently the second oldest corporation in North America, continues as an activity entity based in Burlington, New Jersey.

For a brief period beginning in 1688, New York, East Jersey and West Jersey came under the short-lived Dominion of New England. New York and New Jersey were largely overseen by a Lieutenant Governor and army captain, Francis Nicholson. The Proprietors of East Jersey were angered by the revocation of their charters, but retained their property and petitioned Andros, the governor of the dominion, for manorial rights. The colony proved too large for a single governor to administer, and Andros was highly unpopular.

After news of the Glorious Revolution in England reached Boston in 1689, the anti-Catholic Puritans in New England, and Dutch Calvinists in New York launched a revolt against Andros, arresting him and his officers out of fear that Andros sought to impose popery on the colony. Leisler's Rebellion in New York City deposed Nicholson in what amounted to an ethnic war between English newcomers and the Dutch who were old settlers. After these events, the colonies reverted to their previous forms of governance until 1702.

=== Governors of East Jersey (1674–1702) ===
Portrait	Governor	Took office	Left office	Notes
—	Philip Carteret (1639–82)	1674	1682	Carteret refused to give up his position as governor when demanded by Edmund Andros, Governor of New York; Andros had Carteret beaten and arrested; Carteret was acquitted at trial, but injuries from the attack led to his death
Portrait of Sir Edmund Andros	Edmund Andros (1637–1714)	1674	1681	In 1674, Andros was appointed to oversee the Duke of York's possessions in the Province of New York. Andros assumed that included his possessions in New Jersey as well. Carteret and proprietors in New Jersey resisted Andros's claim. He returned to England in 1678 for instructions.; Andros returned with a mandate from the Duke of York to control both colonies and attempted to assert his authority. Governor Carteret continued to resist his claim.; After Sir George Carteret's death in 1680 and Philip Carteret's acquittal, Andros assumed authority over the colony for 10 months.; Andros was recalled to England in January 1681 under the pretense of facing financial corruption charges but more because he was a political liability to the Duke of York.
—	Robert Barclay (1648–90)	1682	1688	Barclay was leader of the Quaker movement and one of the foremost Quaker apologists.; Despite the brief interlude of the Dominion of New England, Barclay claimed the governorship until his death in 1690.; Deputy Governors included Thomas Rudyard (1682–83), Gawen Lawrie (1683–86), Neill Campbell (1686–87), and Andrew Hamilton (1687–88).
Portrait of Sir Edmund Andros	Edmund Andros (1637–1714)	1688	1689	Governor of the Dominion of New England.; Administration of East Jersey, West Jersey, and New York colonies during this brief period overseen by Lieutenant Governor Francis Nicholson.
—	Vacant	1690	1692	The East Jersey Proprietors nominated two men, John Tatham and Colonel Joseph Dudley, both of whom were rejected.; One historian claims Tatham served briefly as governor.; Tatham may have been rejected because of suspicion of culpability in the death of James Budd; Dudley because of his ties to Andros.
	Andrew Hamilton (d. 1703)	1692	1697	Deposed by the Board of Trade on the instigation of Jeremiah Basse under the claim that "no other than a natural-born subject of England could serve in any public post of trust or profit" (Hamilton was Scottish) in accordance with the Navigation Act of 1696.
—	Jeremiah Basse (d. 1725)	1698	1699	A former Anabaptist preacher.; Served as agent for the West Jersey Society to the Board of Trade from 1695–98; Basse convinced the Board of Trade to depose Hamilton, and he advocated against the colonial proprietors.; Nominated to replace Hamilton by the Board of Trade in 1697.; The administration of the colony suffered under his governorship, he was recalled to England in 1699.; He returned to New Jersey in 1703 and later served as secretary for Lord Cornbury and Lord Lovelace, before his conviction for perjury.; He would remain involved in provincial politics until his death in 1725.
	Andrew Hamilton (d. 1703)	1699	1702	Reappointed in 1699, after the King's attorney general and solicitor general ruled that the Navigation Act of 1696 did not prohibit Scotsmen from holding office.; By his death in April 1703, he had not been relieved of his position as governor.

=== Governors of West Jersey (1680–1702) ===
Portrait	Governor	Took office	Left office	Notes
—	Edward Byllynge (d. 1687)	1680	1687	Byllynge, a London brewer who never came to West Jersey died in England in 1687.; Deputy Governors included Samuel Jennings (1681–84), Thomas Olive (1684) and John Skene (1684–87).
—	Dr. Daniel Coxe (1640–1730)	1687	1688	Dr. Coxe never left England and became Governor of West Jersey after purchasing the holdings of Edward Byllynge from his heirs.; Edward Hunloke served as Coxe's deputy governor (1687–88)
Portrait of Sir Edmund Andros	Edmund Andros (1637–1714)	1688	1689	See notes above.
—	Dr. Daniel Coxe (1640–1730)	1689	1692	After being dissuaded by family and friends not to travel to West Jersey, Coxe sells part of his land holdings and the right to government to the West Jersey Society.; Edward Hunloke served as Dr. Coxe's deputy governor (1690–92) until his sale of the colony to the West Jersey Society, which appointed Hamilton.
	Andrew Hamilton (d. 1703)	1692	1697	See notes above.
—	Jeremiah Basse (d. 1725)	1698	1699	See notes above.
—	Andrew Bowne (c.1638-c.1708)	1699	1699	Chosen by the Provincial Council to serve as deputy governor during Basse's journey to England, and served until Hamilton's arrival.
	Andrew Hamilton (d. 1703)	1699	1702	See notes above.

== As a British Crown colony (1702–76) ==
=== Governors of New York and New Jersey (1702–38) ===
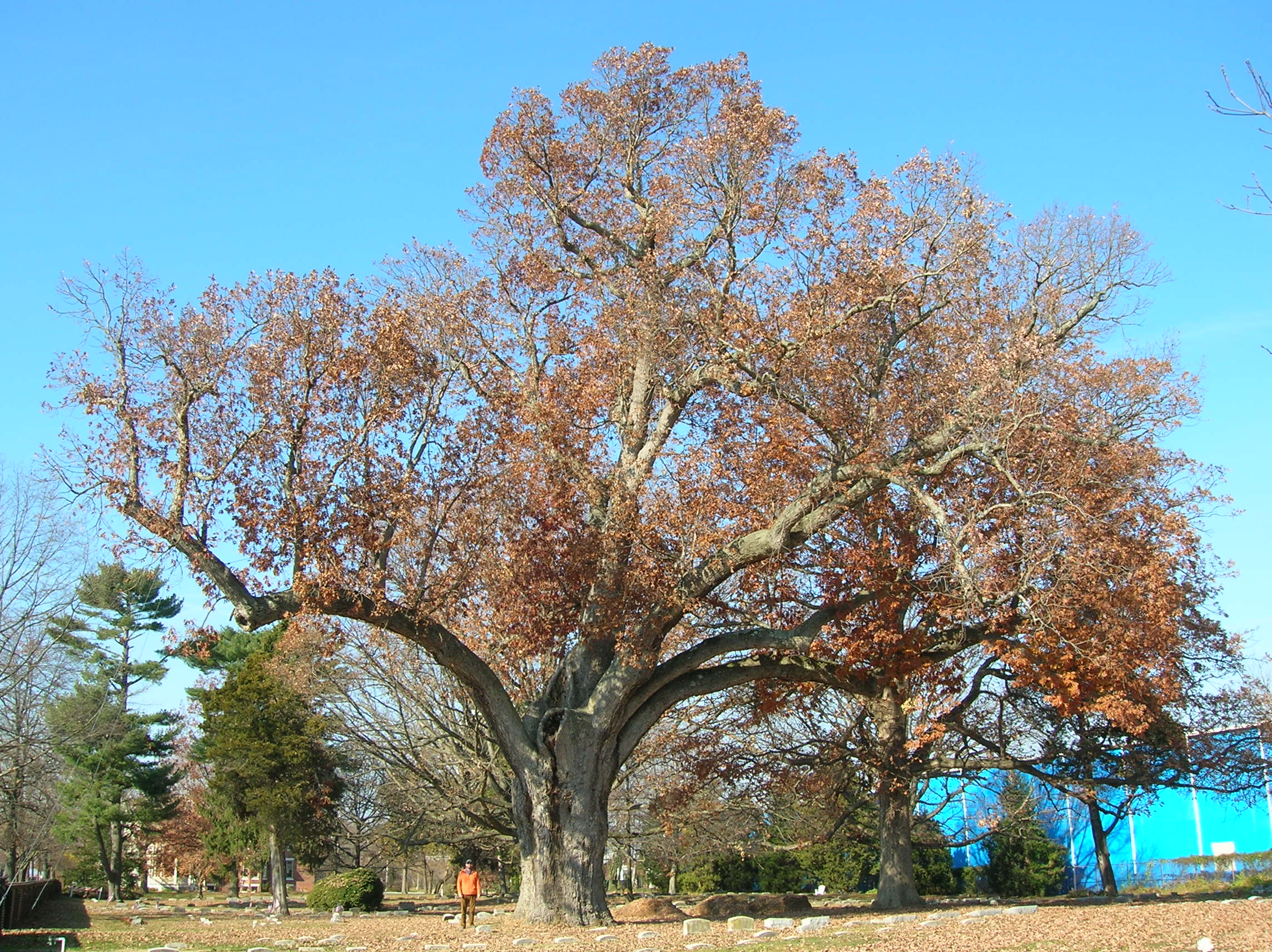
John Fenwick, the founder of New Salem (now Salem, New Jersey) the first Quaker settlement in West Jersey, signed a treaty with the Lenape beneath the "Salem Oak" in 1675. The oak tree is said to be approximately 600 years old.

Shortly after ascending to the British throne, Queen Anne (1665–1714) reunited East Jersey and West Jersey as a royal colony and appointed her cousin Edward Hyde, Viscount Cornbury, as the province's first Royal Governor. In 1702, the governments of the two proprietary colonies had surrendered their authority to the Crown which reorganized New Jersey into a crown colony with a government that consisted of a governor and twelve-member council appointed by the British monarch, and a twenty-four-member assembly whose members were elected by colonists who were qualified to vote by owning at least 1,000 acres of land.

For the next four decades, New Jersey and New York shared one royal governor. Because the crown's representatives were generally incompetent or corrupt, and the royal governor often ignored New Jersey and its affairs, the colonists had substantial autonomy, and the proprietors continued to wield considerable power through the retained control of land titles and sales. The relationship between many of the Royal Governors and the provincial assembly was often hostile. The assembly would simply respond to disagreements over legislation by using its appropriation power to withhold the governor's salary. Several historians point towards a factionalism which defined the colonial government, but the factions have been described as inchoate and characterized by shifting alliances between the colony's various ethnic, religious, proprietary, and landowning groups.

During this period, the population of the colony began to expand, from 14,000 in 1700 to nearly 52,000 by 1740. It was a diverse colony, as Queen Anne and Royal Governor Hunter began to important Palatine Germans into New York's Hudson Valley in a plan to produce naval stores. Many of these German families eventually settled in New Jersey. West Jersey's colonists included Irish, English, Welsh and Scottish Quakers and the descendants of Swedish and Finnish colonists from the former New Sweden colony. Dutch and Huguenot families from New York settled in the valleys of the Raritan River and Hackensack River, and in the northwestern New Jersey's Minisink region. New Englanders from Connecticut and Long Island, and English planters from Barbados arrived with African slaves. Because of its liberal grant of religious freedom, the colony's diversity was also reflected in its religious plurality, with a strong presence of Dutch Reformed, Lutheran, Huguenot, Quaker, Puritan, Congregationalist, Presbyterian, Baptist, and Anglican churches.

No.	Portrait	Governor	Took office	Left office	Notes
1		Edward Hyde, Lord Cornbury (1661–1723)	1701	1708	Lord Cornbury's tenure was marked with accusations of cross-dressing, corruption, arrogance, and decadence.; Historians claim that he illustrated the worst form of the English aristocracy's "arrogance, joined to intellectual imbecility" and characterize him as a "degenerate and pervert who is said to have spent half of his time dressed in women's clothes", a "fop and a wastrel".; He was recalled by Queen Anne who received several complaints from colonists of "numerous malpractices and misappropriations".
2	—	John Lovelace, 4th Baron Lovelace (1672–1709)	1708	1709	Lord Lovelace died in office, in a short tenure marked by prosecuting Governor Jeremiah Basse and other supporters of Lord Cornbury.
—	—	Richard Ingoldesby (d. 1719)	1709	1710	An army officer who served as Lieutenant Governor under Lord Cornbury and Lord Lovelace, and acting governor upon the death of Lovelace.; His commission for governorship was revoked in October 1709, but the news only reached him in April 1710.
3	Portrait of Governor Hunter by Sir Godfrey Kneller (c.1720)	Robert Hunter (1664–1734)	1710	1720	Hunter sailed to America in 1710 with 3,000 Palatine German (Kurpfälzische) refugees who encamped in the Hudson Valley, and then settled in upstate New York and New Jersey.; Hunterdon County was named in his honor.
4	Portrait of William Burnet by John Watson	William Burnet (1687/88–1729)	1720	1728	Burnet left office after being appointed Governor of Massachusetts and New Hampshire.; Son of Gilbert Burnet, Anglican Bishop of Salisbury and fervent supporter of William III and Mary II in the Glorious Revolution of 1688.
5	—	Colonel John Montgomerie (d. 1731)	1728	1731	Montgomerie died in office after an epileptic seizure.
—	Portrait of Lewis Morris by John Watson	Lewis Morris (1671–1746)	1731	1732	Acting governor after death of Governor Montgomerie, as President of Council.; Morris actively advocated to separate New Jersey from New York control from 1728–38.
6	Portrait of Sir William Cosby	Sir William Cosby (1690–1736)	1732	1736	Assumed office 7 August 1732 when he arrived at Sandy Hook.; He rarely visited New Jersey and only met the provincial council or assembly eight times.; He died in office in 1736 from tuberculosis.; In New York, Cosby prosecuted John Peter Zenger, a newspaper publisher for libel after Zenger's newspaper severely criticized his administration.
—	—	John Anderson (1665–1736)	1736	1736	Acting governor after the death of Governor Cosby, in his role as President of Council
—	—	John Hamilton	1736	1738	Acting governor in his role as President of Council, after the death of acting governor Anderson.; Lewis Morris is said to have served as acting governor during this time, although his authority was disputed.
7	—	John West, 1st Earl De La Warr (1693–1766)	1737	1737	West never travelled to America.; Resigned before taking the governorship so that he could continue serving in the military and in the House of Lords.

=== Governors of New Jersey (1738–76) ===
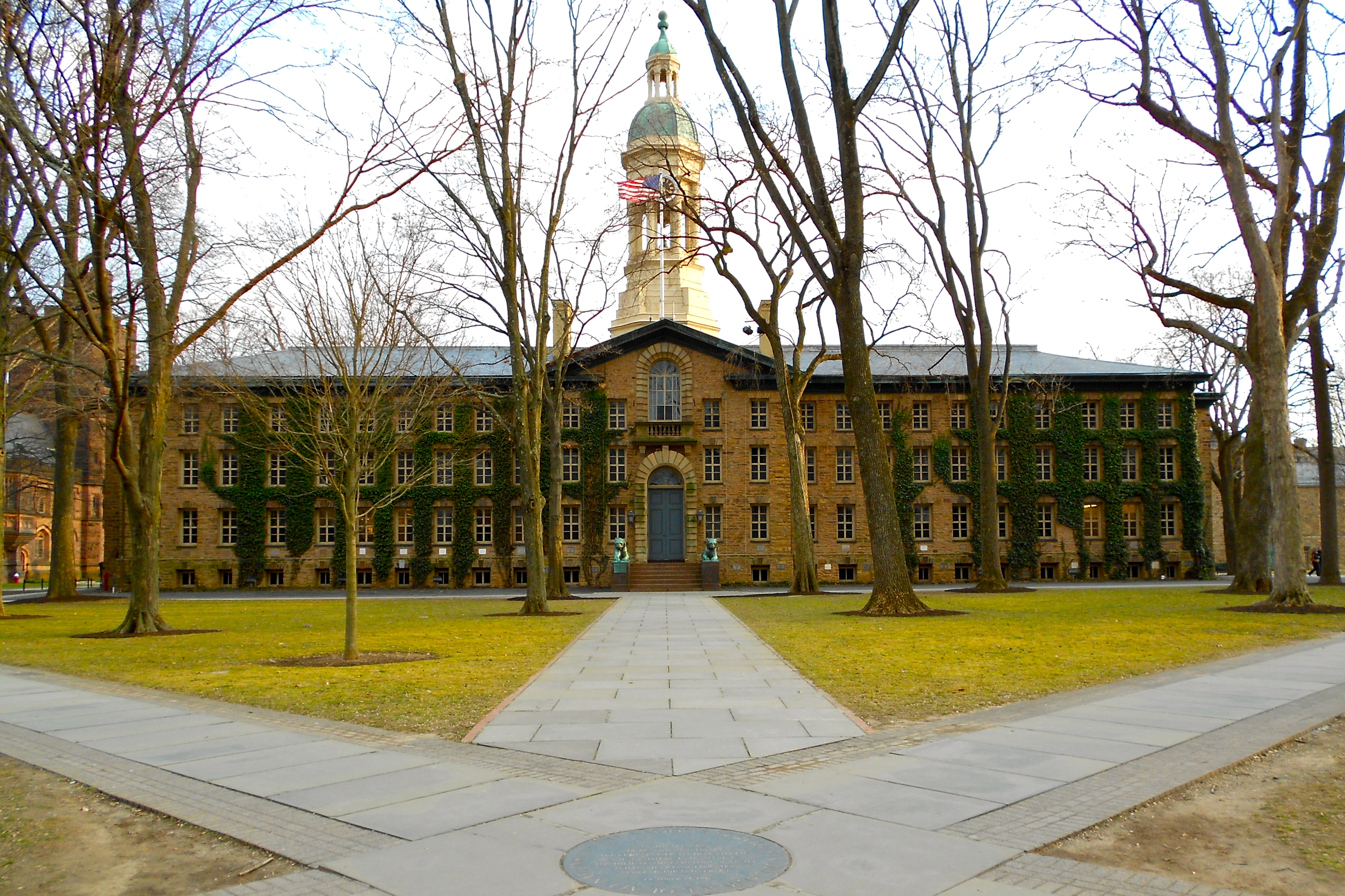
Built in 1756, Nassau Hall, or "Old Nassau" is the oldest building at Princeton University which was chartered by New Jersey's royal governor ten years earlier.

After tensions were provoked with the Penn's Walking Purchase in 1737, relations between colonists and the region's Native American tribes became increasingly hostile. During these years, colonists left the seacoast cities and settled the colony's northwestern wilderness. Much of the provincial government's actions during this time was organizing the wilderness into townships often named after English and colonial political figures. By the 1750s, violent raids against these settlers, and fears that the French were supporting these hostilities led to the French and Indian War.

During this time, the colonial government provided generous monetary rewards to colonists who killed Indians, established a line of fortifications in the Minisink (i.e., the upper valley of the Delaware River), and mustered military units (the New Jersey Frontier Guard and 1st New Jersey Regiment) to defend this frontier and carry out punitive raids on Indian villages. Hostilities began to subside with the Treaty of Easton in October 1758, negotiated by New Jersey Royal Governor Francis Bernard, Pennsylvania Attorney-General Benjamin Chew, and chiefs of 13 Native American nations, led by Teedyuscung.

New Jersey was the only province to have two colleges established during the colonial period, and the colony's governors were influential in their establishment. Governors John Hamilton, John Reading, and Jonathan Belcher aided the establishment of The College of New Jersey (now Princeton University) which was founded in 1746 in Elizabethtown by a group of Great Awakening "New Lighters" that included Jonathan Dickinson, Aaron Burr, Sr. and Peter Van Brugh Livingston. In 1756, the school moved to Princeton. In 1766, Governor William Franklin issued the charters to establish Queens College (now Rutgers University) in New Brunswick to "educate the youth in language, liberal, the divinity, and useful arts and sciences" and for the training of future ministers for the Dutch Reformed Church. Franklin issued a second charter in 1770 after the college's trustees requested amendments.

In the last year of William Franklin's tenure, his power was diminished and he became marginalized by the rebellious sentiment rising in the colony's residents. The province was being run de facto by the Provincial Congress of New Jersey (1775–76). While colonial militia had put Franklin under house arrest in January 1776, he would not be formally deposed until June 1776 when the colony's Provincial Congress had him imprisoned. Franklin considered the Provincial Congress to be an "illegal assembly." Under the direction of its president Samuel Tucker (1721–89), the Provincial Congress proceeded to adopt a state constitution and reorganize the province into an independent state. The newly formed State of New Jersey elected William Livingston as its first governor on 31 August 1776.

No.	Portrait	Governor	Took office	Left office	Notes
8	Portrait of Lewis Morris	Lewis Morris (1671–1746)	1738	1746	Previously served in the Provincial Council, Assembly and as acting governor.; Morris died in office in 1746.; Morris County, Morristown, Morris Plains, and Morris Township are named in his honor.; Morris's tenure was marked with bitter disputes and deadlocks between himself and factions in the colonial legislature—so bitter that after his death when his widow requested the arrears on his salary, the legislature refused citing that the request was "a subject so universally disliked...there is none will say one Word in its Favour."
—	—	John Hamilton	1746	1747	See notes above.
—	—	John Reading (1686–1767)	1747	1747	Acting governor in his role as President of Council.; Readington Village and Readington Township in Hunterdon County was named in his honor.
9	Portrait of Jonathan Belcher	Jonathan Belcher (1681/2–1757)	1747	1757	Aided the early development of The College of New Jersey (now Princeton University).; Fortified the upper Delaware River valley to prevent Indian attacks during the French and Indian War.; Thomas Pownall was appointed to be Belcher's Lieutenant Governor (1755–57), the first since Richard Ingoldesby served under Lord Cornbury and Lord Lovelace, and the last until the state reinstated the office in 2010. Pownall assumed the governorship of Massachusetts on 3 August 1757.; Belcher died in office on 31 August 1757.
—	—	John Reading (1686–1767)	1757	1758	See notes above.
10	Portrait of Francis Bernard	Francis Bernard (1712–79)	1758	1760	Arrived in Perth Amboy, New Jersey, on 14 June 1758.; In late 1759 was appointed governor of Massachusetts.; Bernardsville, a borough in Somerset County is named in his honor.
11	—	Thomas Boone (c.1730–1812)	1760	1761	Appointed in 1759, but did not arrive in New Jersey until 10 May 1760, and did not meet with the colonial assembly until 30 October 1760.; In 1761, Boone was appointed Governor of South Carolina.; Boonton in Morris County was named in his honor.
12	—	Josiah Hardy (1715–90)	1761	1763	Son of Vice-Admiral Sir Charles Hardy (1680–1744), Lord commissioner of the Admiralty, brother to Sir Charles Hardy (1716–80), Royal Governor of New York.; Hardy gained "a reputation for promptness, attentiveness and openness" as New Jersey's governor.; Replaced in 1763 in an effort to impose greater imperial authority over the colonies following the French and Indian War.; Hardyston Township in Sussex County was named in his honor.
13	Portrait of William Franklin by Mather Brown	William Franklin (c.1730–1814)	1763	1776	Despite his reputation for arrogance, stubbornness and a fiery temper, Franklin is considered one of the more popular and successful chief executives in New Jersey history.; Issued charters to found Queen's College (now Rutgers University).; Franklin was placed under house arrest by colonial militia in 1776 by the order of the Provincial Congress of New Jersey, an entity he referred to as an "illegal assembly."; Franklin Township and Franklin Lakes in Bergen County, and possibly Franklin Township in Somerset County, were named in his honor.

== See also ==
- For post-independence governors (1776–present), see List of governors of New Jersey.
- British colonization of the Americas
- Dutch colonization of the Americas
- Dutch Empire
- English colonial empire
- European colonization of the Americas
- Jersey Dutch
- Keith Line
- Lawrence Line
- New York-New Jersey Line War
- Swedish colonial empire
- Swedish emigration to North America
- Thornton Line
