= Gawen Lawrie =

English deputy governor of East Jersey from 1683 to 1686

2nd Deputy Governor of East New Jersey
- In office 1683–1686
- Governor: Robert Barclay
- Preceded by: Thomas Rudyard
- Succeeded by: Lord Neill Campbell

Personal details
- Born: England
- Died: 1687
- Spouse: Mary
- Children: James Lawrie, Mary Lawrie, Rebecca Lawrie

Gawen Lawrie was a deputy governor of the province of East Jersey in the Thirteen Colonies from 1683 to 1686.

== Biography ==
Of Scottish ancestry, Lawrie was born in England and was a resident and merchant in London for many years.

Along with William Penn and Nicholas Lucas, Gawen Lawrie was a trustee for the legally bankrupt Edward Byllynge from 1675 to 1683. On 1 July 1676, Lawrie was one of the signers of the Quintipartite Deed that split New Jersey into West and East Jersey.

In 1682, Lawrie became involved in East New Jersey as a trustee for the children of Arent Sonmans, one of the Proprietors. Thomas Rudyard was deputy governor under Governor Robert Barclay. The Proprietors and Rudyard had a policy disagreement as to the granting of land, and, on 27 July 1683, appointed Gawen Lawrie deputy governor, replacing Rudyard.

Thomas Rudyard's land dealings resurfaced when, on 28 February 1684/85, he received a grant of 1,038 acres (420 ha) on Raritan Bay in Monmouth County; Lawrie received a grant of 1,000 acres (405 ha). This resulted in Gov. Barclay and the Proprietors issuing instructions to Deputy Governor Lawrie on the laying out of land. Section 7 directly addressed the questionable activity of Rudyard and Lawrie in their taking up of land.

The Proprietors in England were concerned about the secretive dealings of the Lawrie Administration and they instructed the East New Jersey Board of Proprietors to investigate the state of affairs, including an audit of the finances. In March 1686 the Proprietors appointed Andrew Hamilton to oversee the investigation.

During Gawen Lawrie's tenure the Proprietors in England drafted a new constitution for East New Jersey, the Fundamental Constitutions for the Province of East New Jersey. This document, drafted in 1683, was intended to supersede the Concession and Agreement of 1665. Lawrie introduced the new constitution in Council on 12 April 1686; the Council voted "that the same Did not agree with the (constitution) of these American parts--", but nonetheless sent it to the General Assembly for reading. On 16 April, in response to Lawrie's inquiry as to the Assembly's action on the constitution, the lower house reported "That they apprehended the same Did not agree with the (constitution) of this province and that they understood that the same were noe wise bindeing Except past into a Lawe by the Generall Assembly--". With both houses concurring, the Fundamental Constitutions was defeated, and the Concession and Agreement would remain the East Jersey constitution until the surrender to The Crown in 1702.

In September 1686, the decision was made to remove Lawrie from office, and on 5 October Lord Neill Campbell presented his commission from Gov. Barclay as deputy governor to the East New Jersey Provincial Council, who confirmed and recognized the appointment. Lawrie was then commissioned a member of the council. Lord Campbell, having urgent business in Britain, nominated Councillor Andrew Hamilton as Deputy Governor on 10 December 1686; the next day Lawrie was the only councillor to register a protest and vote against confirming Hamilton. On 5 May 1687 Gov. Barclay and the Proprietors issued a directive to Deputy Governor Hamilton and the Council revoking all powers and authority held by Lawrie. Later in 1687 he died.

== See also ==
- List of colonial governors of New Jersey
