= East New Jersey Provincial Council =

Type
- Type: Upper house of the East New Jersey Legislature

Leadership
- Governor: Various
- Deputy Governor: Various
- President of Council: Occasional

Structure
- Seats: 6 to 12
- Political groups: Local factions
- Length of term: Indefinite
- Authority: Concession and Agreement

Meeting place
- Elizabethtown; Perth Amboy

The East New Jersey Provincial Council or Governor's Council was the upper house of the East New Jersey Legislature under proprietary rule until the surrender of the right of government to The Crown, and Queen Anne's acceptance.

== History ==
The Council was established in 1664 by Sir George Carteret and John Berkeley, 1st Baron Berkeley of Stratton in the Concession and Agreement of the Lords Proprietors of the Province of New-Caesarea, or New-Jersey, to and with all and every the Adventurers and all such as shall Settle or Plant there.

The Concession and Agreement outlined a fusion of powers system, which allowed for an overlap of executive, legislative and judicial authority. It provided for a bicameral legislature consisting of a Council and General Assembly. This system was retained in East New Jersey after the 1674 division of New Jersey. A new system was established in West Jersey.

On April 15, 1702, the Proprietors of East Jersey and those of West Jersey surrendered the right of government to Queen Anne. Anne's government accepted the surrender and united the two colonies as the Province of New Jersey, a royal colony, establishing a new system of government. The East Jersey government remained in power, however, until the arrival and qualification of the royal governor, Viscount Cornbury.

== Composition ==
The Provincial Council consisted of six to twelve members, or any even number between six and twelve, appointed by the governor and serving at the pleasure of the Proprietors.

Three of six councilors were to be considered a quorum. If the Council consisted of a greater number than six, four would be a quorum, provided that all members had been summoned.

The Governor or Deputy Governor was to be President of Council. If a vacancy occurred in the Governor's office due to death or absence from East Jersey, the Council was authorized to appoint a president. This occurred after the death of Gov. Andrew Hamilton on 20 April 1703 when Lewis Morris became president until the arrival of Governor Cornbury and the establishment of the new government.

== Powers ==
=== Legislative ===
The Provincial Council was the upper house of the colonial legislature, and as such was a distant predecessor to the modern New Jersey Senate. Laws enacted were to be in force for one year. Within the one year time frame, laws were to be presented to the Proprietors for ratification. Once so confirmed, the laws were to be in continual force, unless repealed or a sunset provision was included.

The Governor and Council had the authority to set the meeting place and time of the General Assembly, as well as summoning and adjourning them.

=== Executive ===
All civil and military appointments were to be made by the Governor and Council without the General Assembly. In municipalities which were already settled, the Governor and Council had the authority to make judicial appointments. Courts of Assizes and Courts of Sessions were to be constituted by the Governor, Council and Representatives together.

=== Judicial ===
The Governor and Council comprised a court of appeals; all appeals were to be made from the Assizes to the Governor and Council, from thence to the Proprietors and, finally, to The Crown.

== List of governors, deputy governors, and presidents ==
The following is a list of executive and presiding officers from the 1664 establishment of government until the 1702 surrender to the Crown.

- 1665–73: Governor Philip Carteret
- 1672–73: Deputy Governor John Berry
- 1673–74: Dutch invasion and government
- 1674–82: Governor Philip Carteret
- 1682–83: Deputy Governor Thomas Rudyard
- 1683–86: Deputy Governor Gawen Lawrie
- 1686–86: Deputy Governor Lord Neill Campbell
- 1686–88: Deputy Governor Andrew Hamilton
- 1688–90: Part of the Dominion of New England
- 1690–97: Governor Andrew Hamilton
- 1697–99: Governor Jeremiah Basse
- 1697–99: Deputy Governor Andrew Bowne
- 1699–1703: Governor Andrew Hamilton
- 1703: Lewis Morris, President of Council
