= Thomas Deacon =

English non-juror bishop, liturgical scholar and physician

Thomas Deacon (2 September 1697 – 16 February 1753) was an English non-juror bishop, liturgical scholar and physician.

== Early life and education ==
He was born to William and Cecelia Deacon. After his mother married the nonjuror bishop Jeremy Collier, the young Deacon was introduced to many of the leading Jacobite and nonjuring figures including George Hickes. Deacon became an accomplished scholar and was ordained by Jeremy Collier to the nonjuring priesthood in 1716. In addition to his theological studies, Deacon studied medicine with Richard Mead (1673–1754).

== Career and family ==
He served several nonjuring congregations in London before moving to Manchester around 1722, where he became a leading physician. Around 1720 he married Sarah Gamon (1700-1745). Three of his twelve children, and several members of his congregation, served in the Jacobite Manchester Regiment in the Jacobite rising of 1745. The oldest, Thomas Theodorus was executed at Kennington in London in 1746. His brother Robert Renatus died in prison and Charles Clement, a schoolchild during the Rising, was eventually exiled to Jamaica where he died in 1749. His daughter Sarah Sophia (1731–1801) married William Cartwright (1730-99), an apothecary and later a Nonjuring bishop in Deacon's church in both London and Shrewsbury. Their eldest son was named Thomas Theodorus Cartwright.

During his years in Manchester, the city became a significant hub of Jacobite and Nonjuror activity. Though he was clearly a Jacobite, Deacon gave his primary attention to creating a nonjuring church based on primitive sources. He strongly espoused ecclesial independence from the state and opposed reunion with the Church of England. Joining him in his efforts were Collier, Thomas Brett and Roger Laurence, all of whom participated in the Usages Controversy that divided the Nonjuring community.

The Usages party, freed from the oversight of the established church, advocated the reintroduction of four elements to the Eucharist — the invocation of the Holy Spirit, the oblation, the mixed chalice, and the prayers for the dead. The first effort at creating such a liturgy was published in 1718, with the liturgy being drafted by Deacon and Brett. Many Nonjurors, even some who thought the usages acceptable, thought that this effort came at an inopportune time. Brett would later rejoin the main Non-Usages party in 1732 when a concordat was agreed between most nonjurors, but Deacon, remained true to his belief that the Usages were a necessary part of the true and efficacious Eucharist. This strict Usager grouping was unable to persuade two other Bishops to assist the Scottish Episcopalian bishop Archibald Campbell, who decided, alone, to consecrate Deacon and Laurence as bishops of what now became the Orthodox British Church (1733). Deacon, as the last surviving Bishop of the Church, consecrated Kenrick Price in March 1752 to continue the succession. Price consecrated Dr Philip Johnstone Brown around 1760 and after Brown's death consecrated William Cartwright in 1780. Deacon's crozier or pastoral staff was passed on to the later Bishops in the church, Price, Cartwright, Garnett and Booth. It later passed to a Masonic Order before its time in a private museum and Anglican order. The head of the staff is now held by Lambeth Palace Library.

== Publications ==
Deacon's interest in liturgics and spirituality are evidenced in his Compleat Collection of Devotions (1734). This book included a new liturgy, "The Order of the Divine Offices of the Orthodox British Church", which replaced the earlier one from 1718. In this liturgy Deacon added other ancient liturgical practices including infant communion. The book also included excerpts from John Wesley's `Essay upon the Stationary Fasts'. Wesley met Deacon through John Clayton of Manchester who had been part of Wesley's Oxford group, which led to the invitation of the future Methodist founder to contribute to the book. Though never becoming an official Anglican liturgy, Deacon's incorporation of ancient Christian liturgies and reclaiming of the doctrine of eucharistic sacrifice would influence later liturgical developments.

His most important work A Full, True, and Comprehensive View of Christianity (1747) included two catechisms, a detailed theological commentary on the Compleat Collection of Devotions, and the development of a sacramental theology that extended the number of sacraments to twelve. Among the offices added were confirmation, marriage, ordination, and infant communion.

== Death ==
Deacon died on 16 February 1753 and was buried in the churchyard of Manchester's St. Ann's church. His graveslab still remains.
