= Robert Barclay =

Scottish Quaker and writer (1648-1690)

2nd Governor of East Jersey
- In office September 1682 – 3 October 1690
- Deputy: Thomas Rudyard, Gawen Lawrie, Lord Neill Campbell, Andrew Hamilton
- Preceded by: Philip Carteret
- Succeeded by: Edmund Andros (Dominion of New England)

Personal details
- Born: 23 December 1648
- Died: 3 October 1690 (aged 41) Ury House, Kincardineshire
- Spouse: Christian Molleson
- Children: Robert, Patience, Catherine, Jane, Christian, David, John
- Education: Scots College, Paris
- Occupation: Writer, apologist, politician

Robert Barclay (23 December 1648 – 3 October 1690) was a Scottish Quaker, one of the most eminent writers belonging to the Religious Society of Friends and a member of the Clan Barclay. He was a son of Col. David Barclay, Laird of Urie, and his wife, Lady Katherine Barclay. Although he himself never lived there, Barclay was titular governor of the East Jersey colony in North America through most of the 1680s.

== Biography ==
=== Early life and education ===
Barclay was born at Gordonstoun in Moray, Scotland. His father David Barclay, first laird of Ury, had served under Gustavus Adolphus, and pursued a somewhat tortuous course through the troubles of the Civil Wars. His mother was Katherine Gordon (1620–1663), daughter of Sir Robert Gordon, 1st Baronet of Gordonstoun.

Robert was sent to finish his education at the Scots College, Paris, of which his uncle was Rector, and made such progress in study as to gain the admiration of his teachers, specially of his uncle, who offered to make him his heir if he would remain in France, and join the Roman Catholic Church.

=== Joining the Society of Friends ===
In 1667, however, he followed the example of his father, and joined the recently formed Religious Society of Friends after returning to Scotland. Soon afterwards he began to write in defence of the movement, by publishing in 1670 Truth cleared of Calumnies, and a Catechism and Confession of Faith (1673). In 1670 he had married another Quaker, Christian Mollison (c.1651–1722), daughter of Gilbert Mollison of Aberdeen. They had seven children: three sons (Robert, David and John) and four daughters (Patience, Catherine, Christian and Jean).

The essential view which Barclay maintained was that all people can be illuminated by the Inward Light of Christ "which is the author of the Scriptures and will lead them into all truth". His works have often been reprinted. He was an ardent theological student, a man of warm feelings and considerable mental powers, and he soon came prominently forward as the leading apologist of the new doctrine, winning his spurs in a controversy with one William Mitchell. The publication of fifteen Theses Theologiae (1676) led to a public discussion in Aberdeen, each side claiming a victory. The most prominent of the Theses was that bearing on immediate revelation, in which the superiority of the Inward Light of Christ to reason or scripture is sharply stated. He was noted as a strong supporter of George Fox in the controversies that beset Quakers in the 1670s. His greatest work, An Apology for the True Christian Divinity, was published in Latin at Amsterdam in 1676, and was an elaborate statement of the grounds for holding certain fundamental positions laid down in the Theses. It was translated by its author into English in 1678, and is claimed to be "one of the most impressive theological writings of the century".

The Apology, however, failed to arrest the persecution to which the Quakers were exposed, and Barclay himself, on returning from Europe, where he travelled extensively (once with William Penn and George Fox), and had several interviews with Elisabeth, Princess Palatine, was several times thrown into prison, but soon regained his liberty, and was in the enjoyment of Court favour.

=== Political influence ===
In later years he had much influence with James II, who as Duke of York had given New Jersey to Sir George Carteret and John Berkeley, 1st Baron Berkeley of Stratton. After Carteret's death his half (East Jersey) was sold in 1682 to twelve people, eleven of whom were members of the Society of Friends. One of the eleven Quaker proprietors was William Penn, and after expanding to include a larger number of proprietors, the group elected Barclay to be the governor. He is said to have visited James with a view to making terms of accommodation with William of Orange, whose arrival was then imminent.

== Governor of East New Jersey ==
Barclay was an absentee governor, never having set foot in the colony. He governed through a series of deputy governors, who oversaw day-to-day operations of Barclay's government.

Englishman Thomas Rudyard, a London lawyer, was the first to serve as deputy under Robert Barclay, having been appointed on 16 September 1682. Rudyard was the de facto governor. It was during Rudyard's tenure that the four counties of Bergen, Essex, Middlesex and Monmouth were established.

Rudyard and Surveyor General Samuel Groom soon had a policy disagreement on the granting of land. Groom believed in adhering to the Concession and Agreement of John Lord Berkekey and Sir George Carteret, which stated that one seventh part of all land allotments was to be reserved to the Lords Proprietors. Rudyard disagreed with this policy and he and the Council appointed Philip Wells as Deputy Surveyor, thereby circumventing Groom's authority. The Proprietors in England disapproved of Rudyard and Wells' actions, voiding all grants not surveyed by Groom. Rudyard and the Council replied that they would continue granting land as they had been doing, as the majority of Proprietors were not living in East Jersey. The Proprietors then, on 27 July 1683, appointed Gawen Lawrie Deputy Governor, replacing Rudyard. Rudyard remained in office as Secretary and Register until 1685.

Thomas Rudyard's land dealings resurfaced when, on 28 February 1684/5, he received a grant of 1,038 acres (420 ha) on Raritan Bay in Monmouth County. This resulted in Governor Barclay and the Proprietors issuing instructions to Deputy Governor Lawrie on the laying out of land. Section 7 directly addressed the questionable activity of Rudyard and Lawrie himself in their taking up of land. On 5 November 1685 Rudyard sold the land in question to his son in law, Samuel Winder, who on 17 June 1686 sold to Andrew Bowne.

During Gawen Lawrie's tenure the Proprietors in England drafted a new constitution for East New Jersey, the Fundamental Constitutions for the province of East New Jersey. This document, drafted in 1683, was intended to supersede the Concession and Agreement of 1665. Lawrie introduced the new constitution in Council on 12 April 1686; the Council voted "that the same Did not agree with the (constitution) of these American parts--", but nonetheless sent it to the General Assembly for reading. On 16 April, in response to Lawrie's inquiry as to the Assembly's action on the constitution, the lower house reported "That they apprehended the same Did not agree with the (constitution) of this province and that they understood that the same were noe wise bindeing Except past into a Lawe by the Generall Assembly--". With both houses concurring, the Fundamental Constitutions was defeated, and the Concession and Agreement would remain the East Jersey constitution until the surrender to The Crown in 1702.

The Proprietors in England were concerned about the Lawrie's secretive dealings and they instructed the East New Jersey Board of Proprietors to investigate the state of affairs, including an audit of the finances. In March 1686 the Proprietors appointed Andrew Hamilton to oversee the investigation.

In September 1686 the decision was made to remove Lawrie from office, and on 5 October Lord Neill Campbell presented his commission from Gov. Barclay as deputy governor to the East New Jersey Provincial Council, who confirmed and recognized the appointment. Lawrie was then commissioned a member of the council.

Campbell, a Scotsman like Barclay, only served briefly; having urgent business in Britain, he nominated Councillor Andrew Hamilton as his replacement as Deputy Governor on 10 December 1686; the next day Lawrie was the only councillor to register a protest and vote against confirming Hamilton. Neill Campbell returned to Scotland and is not known to have returned to the New World. Lord Neill Campbell died in April 1692.

Andrew Hamilton was Barclay's final deputy governor. Originally a merchant in Edinburgh, he was sent to East Jersey to act as an agent to recruit men to settle there.

After Sir Edmund Andros took control over the Jerseys as part of the Dominion of New England, Hamilton sailed back to England to consult with the Proprietors. On the voyage, he was captured by the French, delaying his journey to London until May 1690.

== Later life ==
Robert Barclay's later years were spent at his estate of Ury, where he died.

== Descendants ==
Robert Barclay had a son, known as David Barclay of Cheapside (1682–1769), who became a wealthy merchant in the City of London. David married Priscilla Freame, daughter of the banker John Freame, and they had a son known as David Barclay of Youngsbury (1729–1809). His legacy was as one of the founders of the present-day Barclays Bank, a century ahead of its formation under that name, and in the brewing industry; he also manumitted an estate of slaves in Jamaica.

A more distant descendant is Priscilla Wakefield, née Priscilla Bell (1751–1832). She was an English Quaker, educational and feminist economics writer, and philanthropist. Her mother was Barclay's granddaughter.

Robert Barclay Allardice, pioneer of the sport of the 19th century sport of pedestrianism was a great-great-grandson of Barclay.

== Works ==
- 1670: Truth cleared of Calumnies, wherein a book, entitled, A Dialogue between a Quaker and a Stable Christian, (printed at Aberdeen, and, upon good ground, judged to be writ by William Mitchel, a preacher near by it, or at least that he had a chief hand in it,) is examined, and the disingenuity of the Author, in his representing the Quakers, is discovered; here is also their case truly stated, cleared, demonstrated, and the Objections of their opposers answered according to truth, scripture, and right reason; to which are subjoined, Queries to the Inhabitants of Aberdeen, which might also be of use to such as are of the same mind with them elsewhere in the world.
- 1671: William Mitchell unmasked, or the Staggering instability of the pretended Stable Christian discovered; his omissions observed, and weakness unvailed, &c.
- 1672: Seasonable warning and serious exhortation to, and expostulation with, the inhabitants of Aberdeen, concerning this present dispensation and day of God’s living visitation towards them.
- 1673: A Catechism and Confession of Faith, approved of, and agreed to by the general assembly of the patriarchs, prophets, and apostles, Christ himself chief speaker in and among them, which containeth a true and faithful account of the principles and doctrines which are most surely believed by the churches of Christ in Great Britain and Ireland, who are reproachfully called by the name of Quakers, yet are found in the one faith with the primitive church and saints, &c.
- 1674: The Anarchy of the Ranters and other Libertines, &c.
- 1675: Theses Theologicae (trans. "Theological Theses")
- 1676: Theologiae vere Christianae Apologia (trans. "An apology for a really Christian Theology")
- 1676: An Apology for the true Christian Divinity, as the same is held forth and preached by the people called, in scorn, Quakers; being a full Explanation and Vindication of their Principles and Doctrines, by many Arguments deduced from Scripture and right reason, and the testimonies of famous Authors, both ancient and modern, with a full Answer to the strongest Objections usually made against them; presented to the King; written and published, in Latin, for the information of Strangers, by Robert Barclay; and now put into our own Language, for the benefit of his Countrymen.
- 1676: Quakerism Confirmed; being an answer to a pamphlet by the Aberdeen Students, entitled Quakerism Canvassed, written in conjunction with George Keith
- 1677: An Epistle of Love and Friendly Advice to the Ambassadors of the several Princes of Europe met at Nimeguen, to consult the peace of Christendom so far as they are concerned. Written in Latin, but published also in English for the benefit of his countrymen
- 1677: Treatise on Universal Love
- 1679: Apology for the true Christian Divinity Vindicated
- 1679: Vindication of his Anarchy of the Ranters
- 1686: The Possibility and Necessity of the Inward and Immediate Revelation of the Spirit of God, towards the foundation and ground of true Faith, proved in a Letter written in Latin to a person of Quality in Holland, and now also put into English
- 1686: A true and Faithful Account of the most material Passages of a Dispute between some Students of Divinity (so called), of the University of Aberdeen, and the People called Quakers, held in Aberdeen, in Scotland, in Alexander Harper his close, (or yard), before some hundred of Witnesses, upon the 14th day of the second month, called April, 1675, there being John Lesley, Alexander Sherreff, and Paul Gellie, Master of Arts, opponents; and defendants, upon the Quakers' part, Robert Barclay and George Keith: Preses for moderating the meeting, chosen by them, Andrew Thomson, Advocate; and by the Quakers, Alexander Skein, sometime a Magistrate of the City: published for preventing misreports, by Alexander Skein, John Skein Alexander Harper, Thomas Merser, and John Cowie. To which is added, Robert Barclay’s Offer to the Preachers of Aberdeen, renewed and reinforced.
- 1692: Works (folio)

== See also ==
- List of colonial governors of New Jersey

Government offices
Preceded by Philip Carteret	Governor of East Jersey; 1682–1688	Succeeded by Edmund Andros
