= Thomas Rudyard =

American politician

1st Deputy Governor of East New Jersey
- In office 1682–1683
- Governor: Robert Barclay
- Preceded by: Office created
- Succeeded by: Gawen Lawrie

1st Secretary and Chief Register of East New Jersey
- In office 1682–1685
- Governor: Robert Barclay
- Preceded by: Office created
- Succeeded by: James Emott

Attorney General of New York
- In office 1684 – December 1685
- Governor: Thomas Dongan
- Preceded by: Office created
- Succeeded by: James Graham

Personal details
- Born: c 1640 Rudyard, Staffordshire, England
- Died: 2 November 1692 St. Michael, Barbados
- Spouse(s): Alice Boscowen, Hannah Beaumont
- Children: Anne Rudyard, Margaret Rudyard, Benjamin Rudyard, Bridget Rudyard, John Rudyard
- Occupation: Lawyer

Thomas Rudyard (1640 – buried 2 November 1692) was a Quaker lawyer in London before moving to America and being appointed deputy governor of East Jersey and the first Attorney General of the English Province of New York, the predecessor position to the Attorney General of New York State and the successor position to an analogous office under the Dutch colonial government of New Netherlands.

== Biography ==
Born at Abbey Farm, Rudyard, Staffordshire, he was one of many proprietors of New Jersey, owning half of a share of West Jersey property.

Later a resident of Lombard Street, London, in the early 1680s he was a very active member of the British Quakers' Meeting for Sufferings which met quarterly in London to monitor the persecution of Quakers around Britain, and provide support to them and their families. He was also Penn's solicitor and worked closely with Penn in drawing up the first Frame of Government of Pennsylvania. He was appointed Deputy Governor of East New Jersey, as well as Secretary and Chief Register, from November 1682 until February 1684, when he removed to Pennsylvania.

As Governor Robert Barclay was an absentee official who never actually visited East New Jersey, Rudyard was the de facto governor. It was during Rudyard's tenure that the four counties of Bergen, Essex, Middlesex and Monmouth were established.

Rudyard and Surveyor General Samuel Groom soon had a policy disagreement on the granting of land. Groom believed in adhering to the Concession and Agreement of John Lord Berkekey and Sir George Carteret, which stated that one seventh part of all land allotments was to be reserved to the Lords Proprietors. Rudyard disagreed with this policy and he and the Council appointed Philip Wells as Deputy Surveyor, thereby circumventing Groom's authority. The Proprietors in England disapproved of Rudyard and Wells' actions, voiding all grants not surveyed by Groom. Rudyard and the Council replied that they would continue granting land as they had been doing, as the majority of Proprietors were not living in East Jersey. The Proprietors then, on 27 July 1683, appointed Gawen Lawrie deputy Governor, replacing Rudyard. Rudyard remained in office as Secretary and Register until 1685.

Thomas Rudyard's land dealings resurfaced when, on 28 February 1684/5, he received a grant of 1,038 acres (420.065 ha) on Raritan Bay in Monmouth County. This land is now Cliffwood and Cliffwood Beach in Aberdeen Township. This resulted in Governor Barclay and the Proprietors issuing instructions to Deputy Governor Lawrie on the laying out of land. Section 7 directly addressed the questionable activity of Rudyard and Lawrie himself in their taking up of land. On 5 November 1685 Rudyard sold the land in question to his son in law, Samuel Winder, who on 17 June 1686 sold to Andrew Bowne.

Rudyard's political activity was not limited to East New Jersey, for in 1684 Gov. Thomas Dongan of New York appointed him Attorney General there. He was replaced as Attorney General in December 1685 by James Graham.

In 1685 Thomas Rudyard left East New Jersey for Barbados, where he died in 1692.

== See also ==
- List of governors of New Jersey

== Sources ==
- New England Historic Genealogical Society
