= Richard Townley =

English emigrant to the United States

Member of the East New Jersey Provincial Council
- In office October 20, 1686 – 1692

Member of the New York Provincial Council
- In office 1692–1692

Member of the New York Provincial Council
- In office 1697–1697

Member of the New Jersey Provincial Council for the Eastern Division
- In office November 29, 1705 – April 1711 (Died)

Personal details
- Born: England
- Died: April 1711
- Spouse: Elizabeth Smith - Carteret
- Children: Charles Townley, Effingham Townley

Coat of Arms of Richard Townley

Colonel Richard Townley (died 1711) was born in England probably at Astlam (Astleham) Manor in Littleton (formerly in Middlesex, today in Surrey). He was the eighth son of Nicholas Townley of Littleton and Joanne White.

He emigrated to Virginia in the suite of Lord Effingham, Governor of Virginia in 1683. He settled in the Elizabethtown, New Jersey area and married his 2nd wife, Elizabeth Carteret (née. Smith), widow of the first governor of New Jersey Philip Carteret in 1685.

Townley was one of the East New Jersey Provincial Council during the administration of deputy governor Lord Neill Campbell in 1686. In 1692 and 1697 he was a member of the New York Provincial Council but was accused by New York Governor Lord Bellomont of attending neither.

At the time of his death in April 1711, Richard Townley was Presiding Judge of the Court of Quarter Sessions for Essex County. He left two sons, Charles and Effingham.
