= Roger Laurence =

English nonjuring priest and controversialist (1670–1736)

Roger Laurence (1670–1736) was an English nonjuring priest and controversialist.

== Life ==
The son of Roger Laurence, armorer, he was born 18 March 1670, and admitted on the royal mathematical foundation to Christ's Hospital in April 1679, from the ward of St Botolph, Bishopsgate, on the presentation of Sir John Laurence, merchant, of London. On 22 November 1688 he was discharged and bound for seven years to a merchant vessel. He was afterwards employed by the firm of Lethieullier, merchants of London, and was sent by them to Spain, where he remained for some years.

He studied divinity, became dissatisfied with his baptism among dissenters, and was informally baptised at Christ Church, Newgate Street, on 31 March 1708, by John Bates, reader at the church. Laurence's act attracted attention, and was disapproved by the Bishop of London. Laurence then published his Lay Baptism Invalid, which gave rise to a controversy. It was discussed at a dinner of thirteen bishops at Lambeth Palace on 22 April 1712, and a declaration was drawn up in favour of the validity of baptisms performed by non-episcopally ordained ministers. This was offered to Convocation on 14 May 1712, but rejected by the lower house after some debate.

Through the influence of Charles Wheatly, then Fellow of St John's College, Oxford an honorary degree of M.A. was conferred on Laurence by the University of Oxford on 16 July 1713. He was ordained deacon on 30 November, and priest on 19 December 1714, by the nonjuring bishop George Hickes. In 1716–18 nonjuring ordinations took place in Lawrence's chapel on College Hill, City of London. He was consecrated a bishop by Archibald Campbell in 1733; but his consecration, performed by a single bishop, as not recognised by other nonjurors. A new faction was started, of which Campbell, Laurence and Thomas Deacon were the leaders, Thomas Brett being at the head of the original body of nonjurors.

Laurence died on 6 March 1736 at Kent House, Beckenham, the country residence of the Lethieulliers, aged nearly 66, and was buried at Beckenham on 11 March. In his will, made 29 February 1736, he is described as 'of the parish of St. Saviours in Southwark.' He left all his property to his wife, Jane Laurence, whose maiden name was Holman.

== Works ==
He published:

- 'Lay Baptism Invalid, or an Essay to prove that such Baptism is Null and Void when administer'd in opposition to the Divine Right of the Apostolical Succession. By a Lay Hand' (anon.), London, 1708. Editions, with various alterations, appeared in 1709, 1712, 1714, 1723, and 1725, and a reprint, edited by W. Scott, in 1841. The book was attacked by Gilbert Burnet in a sermon (7 November 1710); by Bishop William Fleetwood in an anonymous pamphlet; by Bishop William Talbot in a charge of 1712; and by Joseph Bingham in his 'Scholastical History of Lay Baptism,' (1712). Laurence was supported by George Hickes and Thomas Brett.
- 'Sacerdotal Powers, or the Necessity of Confession, Penance, and Absolution. Together with the Nullity of Unauthoriz'd Lay Baptism asserted' (anon., in reply to the Bishop of Salisbury), London, 1711; 2nd edit. 1713; a reprint of the first four chapters was edited by William Gresley in 1852.
- 'Dissenters' and other Unauthoriz'd Baptisms Null and Void, by the Articles, Canons, and Rubricks of the Church of England' (in answer to Fleetwood), London, 1712; 2nd edit. 1713; 3rd edit. 1810; reprint by William Scott with 'Lay Baptism Invalid,' 1841.
- 'The Bishop of Oxford's Charge consider'd.'
- 'The Second Part of Lay Baptism Invalid,' in which he tries to prove his position from Bingham's 'Scholastical History,' London, 1713. Bingham replied in a second part of his 'Scholastical History.' Laurence rejoined in the next.
- 'Supplement to the 1st and 2nd Parts of Lay Baptism Invalid' (assailing also White Kennett) (anon.), London, 1714. Bingham again replied, but was not answered. A bibliography of the controversy respecting lay baptism and Laurence's position is given in Warwick Elwin's 'Minister of Baptism,' pp. 258 et seq.
- 'Mr. Leslie's Defence from some ... Principles Advanc'd in a Letter, said to have been written by him concerning the New Separation' (anon.), 1719.
- 'The Indispensable Obligation of Ministring the Great Necessaries of Publick Worship ... By a Lover of Truth' (anon.), London, 1732–1734. (a) 'The Indispensable Obligation ... with a Detection of the False Reasonings in Dr. B——t's Printed Letter to the Author of "Two Discourses,"' 1732. (b) 'A Supplement to the Indispensable Obligations,' &c., 1733. (c) 'The Supplement Continued,' 1734; in which Laurence comments on his own views and works in the third person.
