= Richard Townley (disambiguation) =

Richard Townley (died 1711) was a privy counsellor.

Richard Townley or Richard Towneley or Richard de Towneley may also refer to:

- Richard de Towneley (MP) (1323–1381), MP for Lancashire
- Richard Towneley (1387–1455), Man-at-arms at the battle of Agincourt
- Sir Richard Towneley (1445–1482), soldier for future Richard III of England
- Richard Towneley (1629–1707), English mathematician and astronomer
- Richard Greaves Townley (1786–1855), English Whig politician

== See also ==
- Towneley family, many of whom were called Richard
