= Quintipartite Deed =

17th century deed of the Province of New Jersey

The dividing lines between the original provinces of West and East New Jersey. Keith Line: Red; Coxe-Barclay Line: Orange; Thorton Line: Blue; Mahacomack Line: Green; Lawrence Line: Black

The Quintipartite Deed was a legal document that split the Province of New Jersey, dividing it into the Province of West Jersey and the Province of East Jersey from 1674 until 1702.

On July 1, 1676, William Penn, Gawen Lawrie (who served from 1683 to 1686 as Deputy to Governor Robert Barclay), Nicholas Lucas, and Edward Byllynge executed a deed with Sir George Carteret known as the Quintipartite Deed, in which the territory was divided into two parts, East Jersey being taken by Carteret and West Jersey by Byllynge and his trustees. The Deed divided New Jersey by a straight line from "the Northernmost Branch of said Bay or River of De la Ware which is in forty-one Degrees and forty minutes of latitude…unto the most southwardly poynt of the East syde of Little Egge Harbour."

Almost as soon as the Deed was signed, disputes arose over the exact dividing point of the two provinces. The first attempt at resolving the issue, the Keith line, was created by Surveyor-General George Keith in 1686, and runs North-Northwest from the southern part of Little Egg Harbor, passing just north of Tuckerton, and reaching upward to a point on the Delaware River which is just north of the Delaware Water Gap.

More accurate surveys and maps were made to further resolve property disputes. This resulted in the Thornton line, drawn around 1696, and the Lawrence line, drawn around 1743, which was adopted as the final line for legal purposes.

== Keith Line ==
The Keith line was created by Surveyor General George Keith in 1686, when he ran the first survey to mark out the border between West Jersey and East Jersey. The Keith line was intended to clarify disputes resulting from the 1676 Quintipartite Deed.

The Keith Line runs north-northwest from the southern part of Little Egg Harbor Township, passing just north of Tuckerton. The line was to continue upward to a point on the Delaware River which is just north of the Delaware Water Gap, but Keith was stopped in his survey by Governor of West Jersey Daniel Coxe, when Keith had reached the South Branch of the Raritan River in what is now Three Bridges in Readington Township.

Today the Keith Line is still visible and can be seen via a map of New Jersey's municipalities. Remnants of the most operative line Keith Line can still be seen in the county boundaries between Burlington and Ocean and between Hunterdon and Somerset, as well as in a number of municipal boundaries within Mercer and Ocean counties, and the alignment of Province Line Road in Mercer County.

In contemporary culture, the Keith Line has been cited as marking the approximate boundary between spheres of influence for New York City sports teams and Philadelphia sports teams; especially in the rivalry between the New York Giants and the Philadelphia Eagles.

== Coxe-Barclay Line ==
Coxe stopped Keith, claiming that his line veered too far to the west. To finish the border, Governor Coxe, and his East Jersey counterpart, Governor Robert Barclay met in London to set a compromise boundary following the South and North Branches of the Raritan River,^{note} the Lamington (or Black) River, a straight line to the head of the Passaic River, along the Pompton and Pequannock Rivers to the latter's head, and then a straight line northeast to New Jersey–New York border. The East Jersey proprietors disowned this line in 1695 and it was formally rescinded by the colonial legislature in 1718.

Today, the Coxe–Barclay line survives in the eastern boundaries of present-day Morris County and Sussex County and the northern boundary of Somerset County.

== Thornton Line ==
The Thornton Line was surveyed in 1696 in an attempt to replace the errors of the Keith line (1686) and its amendment the Coxe–Barclay Line (1688) which was disowned by the East Jersey proprietors in 1695. While it appears on Worlidge's map of the two Jersey colonies, it was never formally adopted.

== Lawrence Line ==
The Lawrence Line was created by surveyor John Lawrence in 1743 and sought to offer final resolution to the division between the two proprietary colonies. Although West Jersey was merged back with East Jersey in 1702, the previous surveys were still disputed as drawn too far west. Lawrence was commissioned in 1743 to resolve the long-standing disputes.

Over a century later, in 1855, the New Jersey Supreme Court adopted the Lawrence Line as the final arbiter in all property settlements in Cornelius and Empson v. Giberson, 25 N.J.L 1 (Sup. Ct. 1855).

Today, the legacy of the Lawrence line is extant in the boundaries of several New Jersey municipalities, including Walpack Township, Sandyston Township, Stillwater Township, Hampton Township, and Green Township in Sussex County in the northwestern region of the state. In 1995, a group of surveyors attempted to plot the true coordinates of the line using GPS.

== Notes ==
Between the two branches of the Raritan, the plantations adjoining the river that were charted in a 1685 map of the Raritan were included in East Jersey. The line behind these plantations was to be extended on the same course, deviating to match property lines, until hitting the North Branch of the Raritan; however, the true extension of this line struck the Lamington before striking the North Branch, and so no part of the North Branch became part of the boundary line.

== See also ==
- New York – New Jersey Line War
