= Archibald Campbell (bishop) =

Scottish bishop (died 1744)

Archibald Campbell (died 1744) was a clergyman of the Scottish Episcopal Church who served as Bishop of Aberdeen. He was the son of Lord Neill Campbell by his first wife Lady Vere Kerr. His grandfathers were Archibald Campbell, 1st Marquess of Argyll, and William Kerr, 1st Earl of Lothian.

He was a student of the Church Fathers and the author of a book The Doctrine of the Middle State between Death and the Resurrection (1721) in defence of prayer for the dead. He lived in England for many years and was an associate of English nonjurors including George Hickes, Thomas Brett, Thomas Deacon, and Roger Laurence. In the usages controversy he was a staunch defender of the usages and wrote a series of pamphlets in defence of their incorporation. He assisted in the preparation of the Usagers Communion Office of 1718, and was the author of the first hymn extant written by an Episcopalian. He also wrote Queries to the Presbyterians of Scotland (1702) and A Query Turned into an Argument in Favour of Episcopacy (1703). When Brett engineered a reunion with the non-usager nonjurors in the early 1730s, Campbell, Laurence, and Deacon stood apart and constituted the extreme usager party. In mid-1733, after failing to find assistance from any English nonjuring or Episcopalian Bishops, Campbell proceeded to consecrate Laurence alone, and thereafter both consecrated Deacon. Due to the uncanonical nature of the consecration this breakaway group was never recognised by the regular nonjurors. The Orthodox British Church, as it became known, had congregations in London, Shrewsbury and Manchester, the latter lasting into the first decade of the nineteenth century.

Campbell died in London in June 1744.

Religious titles
| Preceded by See vacant prededed by George Haliburton | Bishop of Aberdeen; 1721–1724 | Succeeded by James Gadderar |
