= Andrew Bowne =

5th Deputy Governor of East New Jersey
- Governor: Jeremiah Basse
- In office 1699–1699
- Preceded by: vacant
- Succeeded by: vacant

President of the New Jersey Provincial Council
- In office 1705–1708
- Preceded by: Lewis Morris
- Succeeded by: Lewis Morris

Member of the New Jersey Provincial Council for the Eastern Division
- In office July 29, 1703 – 1708 Died
- Preceded by: Office created

Personal details
- Born: c. 1638 Salem, Massachusetts
- Died: c. 1708 Monmouth County, New Jersey
- Spouse: Elizabeth
- Children: Elizabeth
- Occupation: Mariner, merchant, politician

Captain Andrew Bowne (c. 1638 - c. 1708) was an American colonial politician and jurist, who served in various capacities in both New York and New Jersey.

== Biography ==
A son of William and Ann Bowne, Andrew Bowne was born circa 1638 in Salem, Massachusetts, where he was baptized on August 12, 1638. About 1645 or 1646, the Bowne family moved to Gravesend, an English settlement in New Netherland. He became a mariner by profession, and by 1680 was a resident of New York City, where he became a merchant. In 1686 he became a resident of Middletown Township, New Jersey, where he purchased 1,000 acres from Samuel Winder on June 17. Winder was a son in law of Thomas Rudyard, to whom the land had been originally granted. This land is now Cliffwood and Cliffwood Beach in Aberdeen Township; it was here that Bowne lived until his death.

== Political career ==
=== New York ===
On October 10, 1683, after having served there as a juror the month before, Andrew Bowne was appointed by Governor Thomas Dongan as a judge of the Admiralty Court. On November 3, 1684, he was commissioned as an Alderman of New York City, and again on October 16, 1685.

=== East New Jersey ===
Andrew Bowne was appointed as a justice of the peace for Monmouth County in 1690; he also held the position from 1695 through 1698. In 1692 he was appointed a judge of the Court of Session, and was Presiding Judge in 1693, 1697, 1698 and 1699. In 1698 and 1699 Bowne was a judge of the East Jersey Court of Common Right, the supreme court of the colony.

In 1692 Andrew Bowne was appointed a member of the East New Jersey Provincial Council, the upper house of the legislature. He remained of the Council through the first administration of Governor Andrew Hamilton and that of Gov. Jeremiah Basse.

On May 9, 1699, Basse proposed to the council the need for a deputy governor to act during his absence in London; the Council appointed Andrew Bowne to the position; he took the oath of allegiance and official oath on May 15. On August 19, Hamilton was reappointed as governor, succeeding Basse. Hamilton arrived in December 1699, superseding Bowne.

The political rivalry between Bowne and Hamilton did not end here, for on June 17, 1701, Bowne came before the council with a commission dated March 25 and signed by six East Jersey Proprietors living in England appointing him as Governor of East New Jersey. The Proprietors residing in East Jersey were called before the council and questioned the validity of Bowne's commission, as it had been signed by a minority of Proprietors in England, and presented a protest against it. While Bowne was resolved to publish his commission, Hamilton refused to surrender the governor's office, stating that to do so would leave the province without government, as Bowne's commission was defective rendering him unqualified to take over the office.

The following day the Council ordered "that Proclamations be Issued out to Acquaint the People of Capt. Bownes Defective Commission, that no body pay Obedience thereto", signed by Gov. Hamilton under the seal of the province. The Council further ordered that a letter be written to the Proprietors in England advising them of the council's reasons in advising Hamilton not to surrender the government, stating that in their opinion, "the only use Intended to be made of this commission was to Supersede (Colonel) Hamiltons And then to throw up the Other and thereby to Lodge the Government in the People".

=== Province of New Jersey ===
After the late 1690s the government of East and West Jersey became increasingly dysfunctional, of which the controversies involving Andrew Bowne were only a symptom. This ultimately resulted in the surrender by the Proprietors of East Jersey and those of West Jersey of the right of government to Queen Anne. Anne's government united the two colonies as the Province of New Jersey, a royal colony, establishing a new system of government. This reorganization and the period leading up to it saw many New Jersey politicians jockeying for power and influence in the new government. Bowne and his supporters were no exception, as were his opponents.

A 1701 petition to The Lords Commissioners of Trade and Foreign Plantations, signed by Lewis Morris and others, purporting to be "the Greatest part of ye Proprietors of the Provinces of East and West Jersie", recommended the appointment of Andrew Hamilton as Governor of New Jersey, at the same time cautioning against the appointment of Andrew Bowne to the office. A proposal by Sir Thomas Lane and other West Jersey proprietors, however, recommended Bowne for a seat in the proposed New Jersey Provincial Council. A proposal by East Jersey Proprietors William Dockwra, Thomas Barker, Clement Plumstead and Peter Sonmans recommended Bowne or Richard Ingoldesby for governor; if Ingoldesby was the choice then they recommended Bowne for a Council seat (It is notable that these were four of the six who had signed the defective commission as governor).

In spite of the political wrangling in New Jersey, London determined that its interests would best be served by a governor with no previous connections to any of the political factions; in late 1702 Queen Anne appointed her cousin, Viscount Cornbury to the governorship. Andrew Bowne was seated in the council as a member from the Eastern Division. With the suspension of President Lewis Morris from Council in 1704, Bowne became president.

Governor Cornbury appointed Andrew Bowne a judge of the Inferior Court of Common Pleas on December 11, 1704, and on November 6, 1705, elevated him to the New Jersey Supreme Court. In spite of these appointments, Cornbury expressed concern about the health of Bowne and others and their ability to serve in Council to the Lords of Trade in 1703 and 1706. By 1708, Captain Andrew Bowne was dead.

== Personal life ==
Andrew Bowne had five brothers, John, James, Philip and Gershom, and one sister, who married a Mr. Mott. John and James both served in the East Jersey General Assembly, with John serving as Speaker from 1680 to 1683.

He was married to Elizabeth; they had one daughter, also named Elizabeth.
