= Lord Neill Campbell =

Scottish nobleman and Deputy Governor of East New Jersey (c. 1630–1692)

3rd Deputy Governor of East New Jersey
- In office 4 June 1686 – 10 Nov. 1686
- Governor: Robert Barclay
- Preceded by: Gawen Lawrie
- Succeeded by: Andrew Hamilton

Personal details
- Born: c. 1630 Scotland
- Died: April 1692 Scotland
- Spouse(s): (1) Lady Vere Kerr, (2) Susan Menzies
- Children: Charles, Archibald, Mary, Anna, Jean, Neil, Alexander, Christian, Susan

Lord Neill Campbell (c. 1630 – April 1692) was a Scottish nobleman who served as Deputy Governor of East New Jersey during 1686, succeeding Gawen Lawrie.

== Biography ==
He was a younger son of the 1st Marquess of Argyll by his wife, the former Lady Margaret Douglas, daughter of the 7th Earl of Morton. His brother was Archibald Campbell, 9th Earl of Argyll, who was executed in 1685 for his participation in the Monmouth Rebellion. Campbell himself was exiled from Scotland.

On 28 January 1668, he married Lady Vere Kerr, third daughter of the 1st Earl of Lothian, and by her was the father of five children: Charles, Archibald (later Bishop of Aberdeen), Mary, Anna and Jean. Lady Vere died in 1674. In 1685 he married Susan Menzies, daughter of Sir Alexander Menzies of Weem and had four more children: Neil, Alexander, Christian and Susan.

Lord Neill Campbell was brought before the Privy Council of Scotland on 1 August 1684; he was, upon posting £5,000 bond, required to remain within six miles of Edinburgh, and to appear before the Council upon six hours notice. His brother, the Earl of Argyll, was captured at Inchinnan on 18 June 1685, and on 30 June 1685 Argyll was executed, like his father, on the maiden in Edinburgh. Sentiments turned against the Campbell family to the point that a movement arose to present a bill in Parliament to abolish the family name altogether.

On 24 June 1685, King James II and VII issued a proclamation against traitors and fugitives in which Neil Campbell's son Archibald, among others, were named with a price of 1,800 Scottish merks offered for their capture. It was shortly after these events that Lord Neill Campbell prepared to voyage to America.

On 13 August 1685, Campbell purchased of Viscount Tarbat one quarter of one twenty-fourth share in East New Jersey; that same day he was given power of attorney by Sir John Dalrymple to act as Dalrymple's agent in America. On 24 August, he was given power of attorney by Robert Blackwood, an Edinburgh merchant.

In the fall of 1685, Lord Neill Campbell and 53 others, including his son Archibald, arrived in Perth Amboy, the capital of East Jersey.

== Political career ==
The incumbent deputy governor, Gawen Lawrie, was under investigation during 1686 by the East Jersey Proprietors for secretive reportings to the Proprietors. On 4 June Governor Robert Barclay issued a commission to Lord Neill Campbell as deputy governor in the event Lawrie needed to be replaced. By September 1686 the decision was made to remove Lawrie from office, and on 5 October Campbell presented his commission from Gov. Barclay as deputy governor to the East New Jersey Provincial Council, who confirmed and recognized the appointment. As Barclay was an absentee official who never actually visited East New Jersey, Lord Neill Campbell was the de facto governor. Lawrie was then commissioned a member of the council.

Lord Campbell, having urgent business in Britain, nominated Councillor Andrew Hamilton as his replacement as Deputy Governor on 10 December 1686; the next day Lawrie was the only councillor to register a protest and vote against confirming Hamilton. Neill Campbell returned to Scotland and is not known to have returned to the New World. Lord Neill Campbell died in April 1692.

== See also ==
- List of governors of New Jersey
