= Name of Jersey =

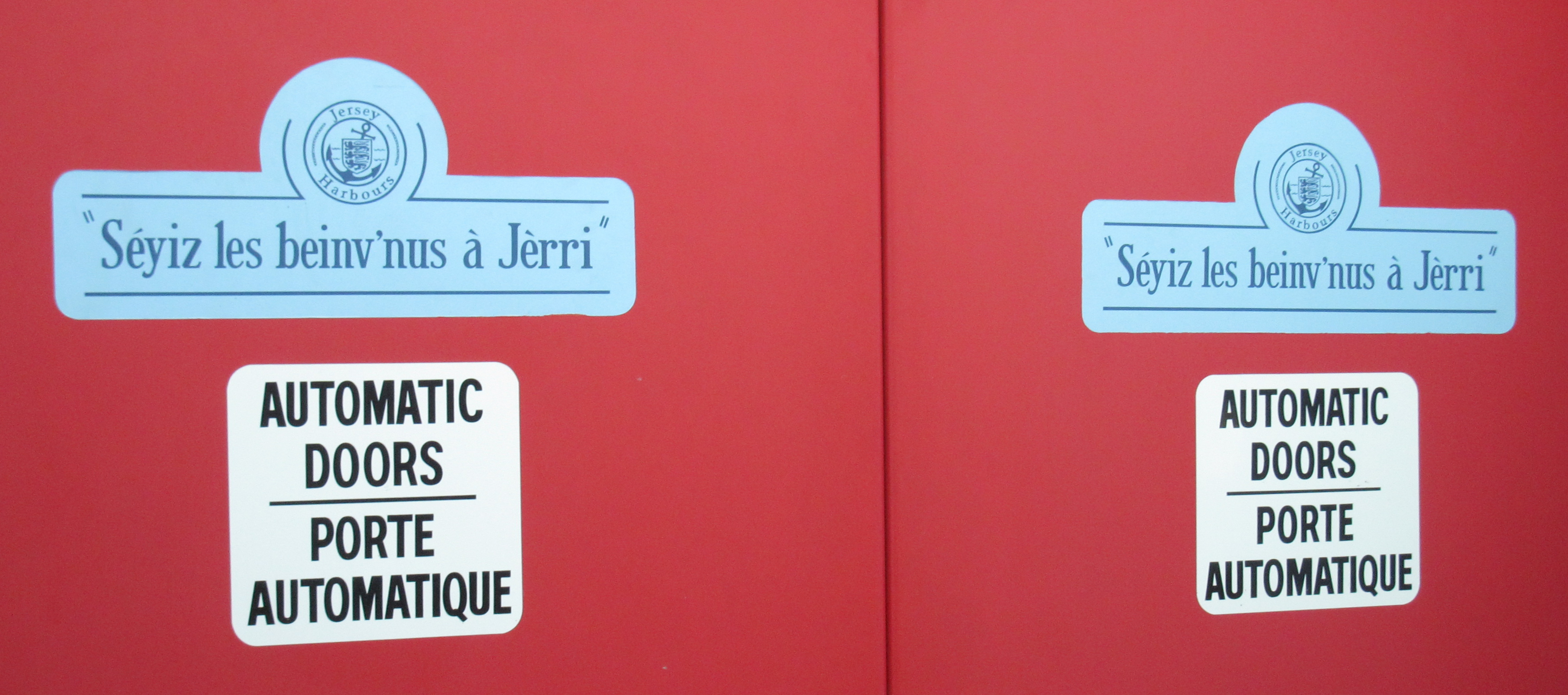
Welcome sign: "Séyiz les beinv'nus à Jèrri" - Welcome to Jersey

Jersey (/ˈdʒɜːrzi/ JUR-zee, French: [ʒɛʁzɛ]; Jèrriais: Jèrri [dʒɛri]), officially the Bailiwick of Jersey (French: Bailliage de Jersey), is a British crown dependency.

== Historic mentions ==
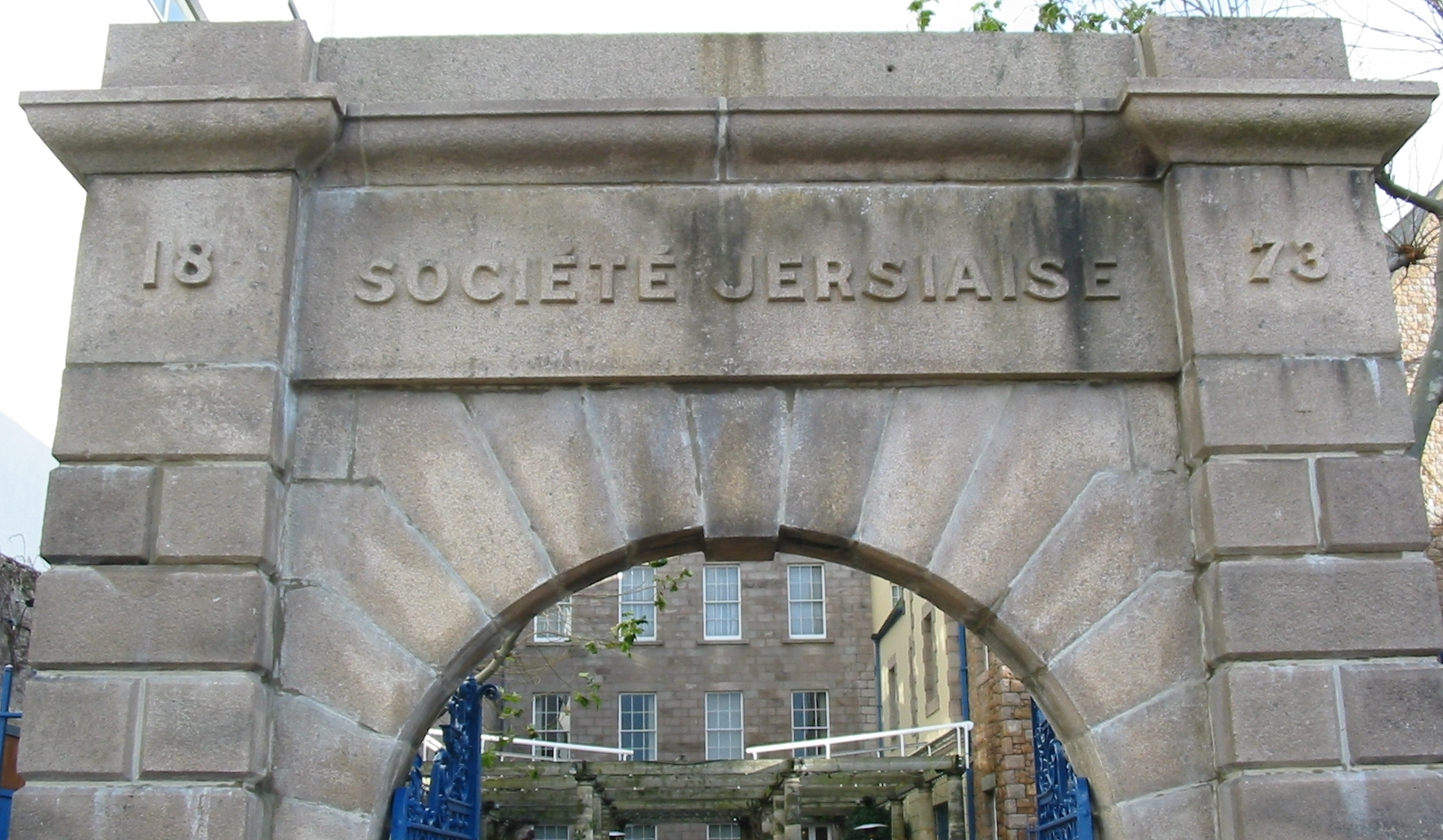
Société Jersiaise: jersiais is the demonym in French from Jersey

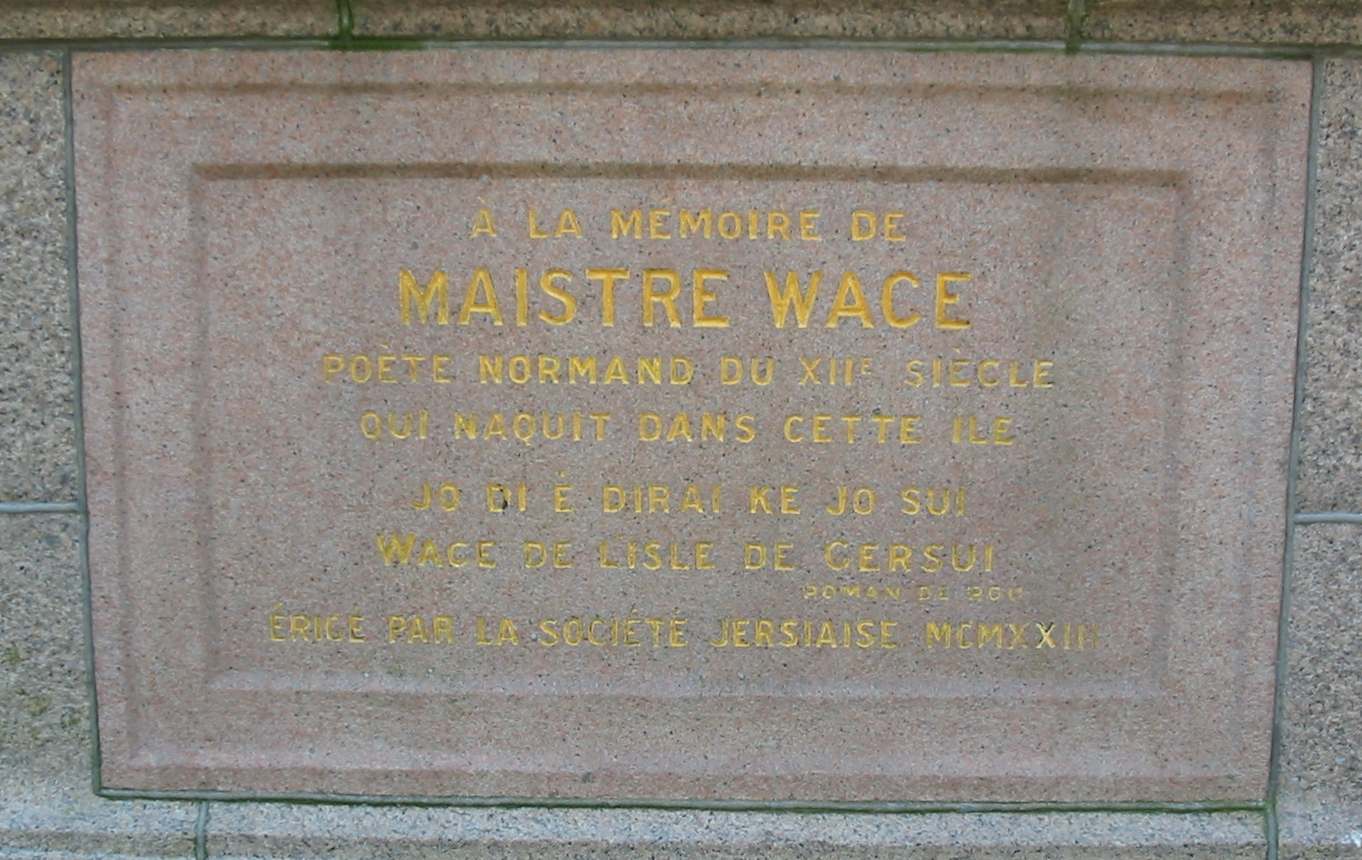
The Wace monument in the Royal Square: "Jo di e dirai ke jo sui Wace de l’isle de Gersui" I say and will say that I am Wace from the Island of Jersey

- Andium (?) 4th century
- insula Gersoi 1022/1026.
- insula Gerseii, var. Gersey, Gersei, Gersoii 1042.
- Gersus ~1070.
- insula de Gerzoi 1080/~1082.
- insula de Gersoi 1066/1083.
- insula Gersoi 1066/1083.
- l'isle de Gersui 1160/1174.
- in Gersoio 1223/1236.
- Gersuy 1339.
- Gersui 1339.
- insula de Jersey 1372.
- insula de Jereseye 1372.
- insula de Gersey 1386.
- insula […] de Jersey 1419.
- Iarsay [read Jarsay] 1585.
- Jarsey 1693.
- Jerzey 1753.
- Isle de Gersey 1753/1785.
- Jerry 1829.
- Ile de Jersey 1854.

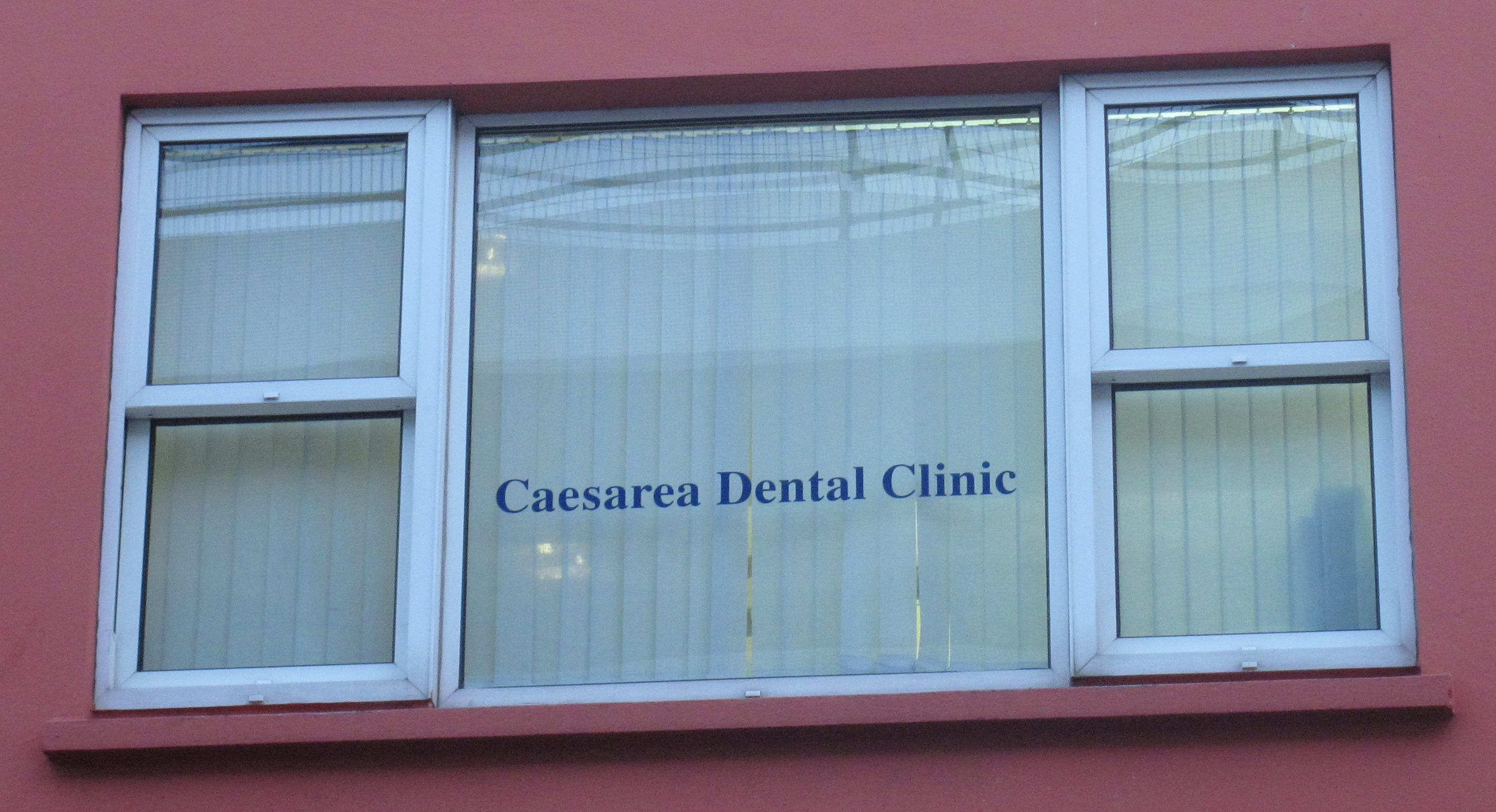
Caesarea Dental Clinic, Saint Helier

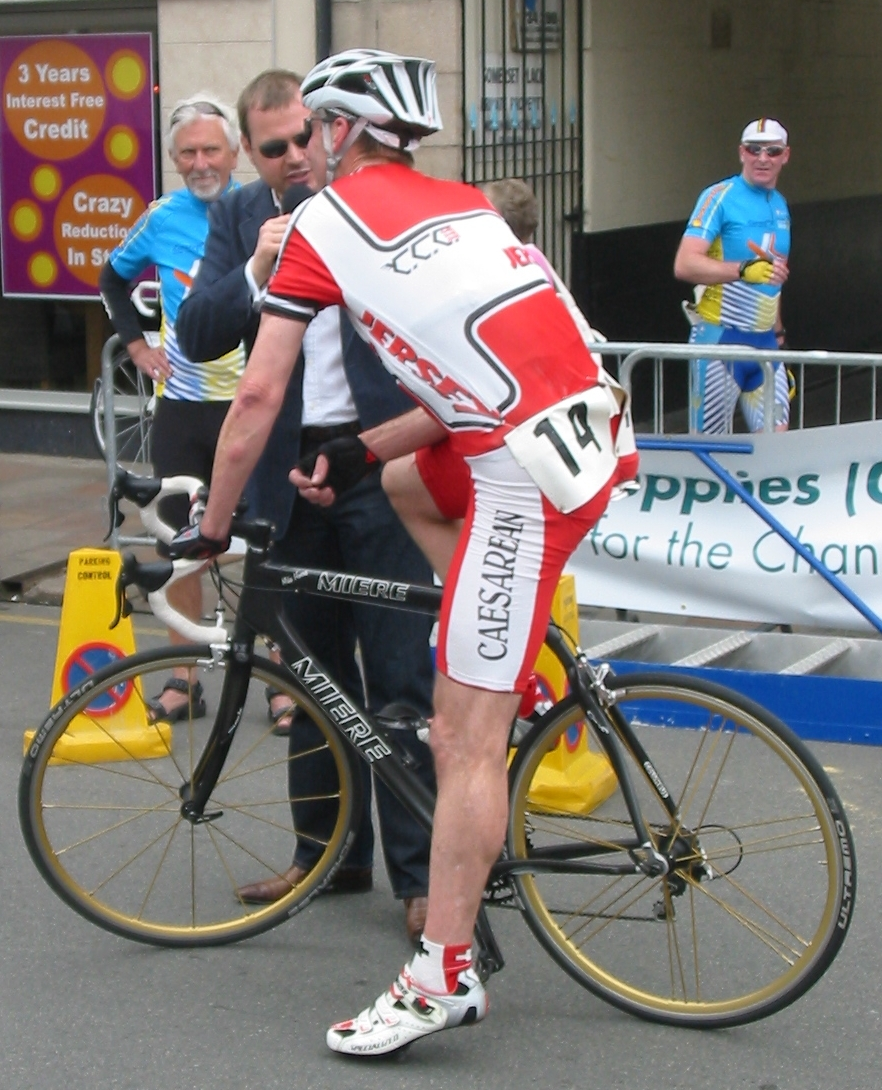
A member of the Caesarean Cycling Club in Jersey wearing the word Caesarean on his kit

The Channel Islands are mentioned in the Antonine Itinerary as the following: Sarnia, Caesarea, Barsa, Silia and Andium, but Jersey cannot be identified specifically because none corresponds directly to the present names. Furthermore, later records evoke Angia (also spelled Agna).

Andium is a Latinized version of the Gaulish (Celtic) *Andion, with and- the Gaulish intensive prefix meaning "very", "much", "big". Andium roughly translates as "big Island", Jersey being the largest of the Channel Islands. The spelling Angia could be an ultimate development of *Andia.

Some others identify it as Caesarea, a late recorded Roman name influenced by the Old English suffix -ey for "island"; this is plausible if, in the regional pronunciation of Latin, Caesarea was not [kae̯saˈreːa] but [tʃesaˈre.a]. Another theory is that the variation of the "J" sound today could be connected with phonetical cousins "g" and "k" (International Phonetic Alphabet) through variable pronunciations based on similar spelling. Theoretically, if Caesarea was originally pronounced with a "k", that may have naturally developed into a "g" sound for locals (or foreigners), making Gersei, Gersoi, or the other spellings relatable. Because "g" is pronounced as both a hard guttural "g" as in "go" and a soft "j" as in "gym" or "gem", the spelling of Jersey could be a result of the variance in its pronunciation.

The name Caesarea has been used as the Latin name for Jersey (also in its French version Césarée) since William Camden's Britannia (published in 1586), and is used in titles of associations and institutions today. The Latin name Caesarea was also applied to the colony of New Jersey as Nova Caesarea.

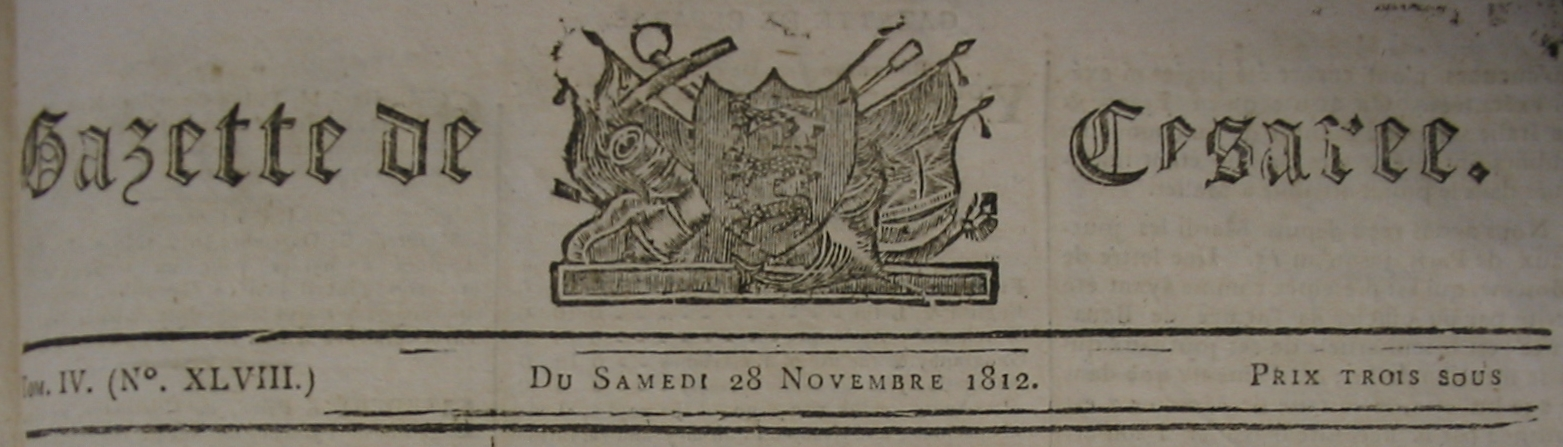
Gazette de Césarée, Jersey newspaper, 1812

Angia could be a misspelling for *Augia, that is the Latinized form of Germanic *aujō (> Old English ī(e)ġ > is-land), that could have extended before the Viking Age along the coast of France, as for île d'Yeu (Augia, Insula Oya) or Oye-Plage (Ogia 7th century) and constitutes the suffix -ey in Jersey, Guernsey (Greneroi), Alderney (Alneroi) and Chausey (Calsoi). Chausey can be compared with Cholsey (GB, Berkshire, Ċeolesiġ 891), interpreted by Eilert Ekwall as "Ċeola 's island".

The ending -ey denotes an island. These -ey names could have been reinforced by the Viking heritage, because -ey is similar, so that it is possible to interpret the first part of the toponym as an Old Norse element. The source of it is unclear. Scholars surmise it derives from hjörr (Old Norse for "sword") or jarl (earl), or perhaps a personal name, Geirr ("Geirr's Island"). The personal name explanation is accepted by Richard Coates, who also discusses the names of the other Channel Islands.

== See also ==
- History of Jersey
- Norman toponymy
- -hou
