= Peter Hollander Ridder =

Swedish Naval Officer (1608–1692)

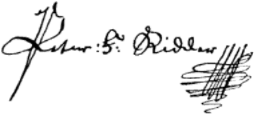
Signature of Peter Hollander Ridder

Peter Hollander Ridder (1608–1692) was a Swedish naval officer who was the 2nd governor of New Sweden, the Swedish colony in North America, from 1640 until 1643.

== Early life ==
Peter Hollander Ridder's father was a Dutchman living in Ekenäs, Finland. Ridder later entered the Swedish Navy where he was promoted to lieutenant in 1637. On 1 July 1639 he was appointed commander of Fort Christina in New Sweden and left Gothenburg on the ship Kalmar Nyckel in September 1639. The voyage went via Amsterdam and Ridder arrived (along with Lutheran minister Reorus Torkillus) to the colony in April 1640.

== Governor of New Sweden ==
After a difficult journey he arrived to New Sweden, together with a handful of settlers, on board the Kalmar Nyckel on her second expedition April 17, 1640. On the same day, Ridder replaced Måns Nilsson Kling as governor. Upon arrival Ridder wrote back to Sweden to Admiral Claes Fleming and Chancellor Axel Oxenstierna requesting more colonists and skilled workmen. This request was fulfilled when Kalmar Nyckel and Charitas arrived to the settlement on November 7, 1641 with additional settlers including many Forest Finns.

He purchased more land from Lenape Indians north of modern-day Philadelphia. This parcel was along the Delaware River between the Falls of the Delaware and Schuylkill River, between what is today Trenton, New Jersey and Morrisville Pennsylvania. When Johan Björnsson Printz took over as governor of New Sweden, Ridder returned to Sweden to serve in the Swedish Navy.

== Later life ==
He left New Sweden in April 1643 on the ship Fama and arrived in Gothenburg in July. Ridder continued his service in the navy and took part in operations against Denmark in 1644. In February 1659 Ridder took part in the fleet's attempt to capture Copenhagen during the Second Danish War, during this operation he was wounded. During the autumn, he then led a naval force that maintained the connection with Stettin in Swedish Pomerania, which was besieged by Brandenburg and Austria. He became a major in 1660 and served as the governor of Vyborg (Swedish: Viborg) in Karelia from 1666 until 1681. Vyborg, the easternmost outpost of the Realm of Sweden, is today located in Leningrad Oblast, Russia.

== Personal life ==
On November 30, 1644, Ridder married Elisabet Johansdotter in Storkyrkan in Stockholm, the couple then had several children.

== Other sources ==
- Johnson, Amandus. The Swedish Settlements on the Delaware Volume I, Their History and Relation to the Indians, Dutch and English, 1638-1664 (Philadelphia: The Swedish Colonial Society, 1911)
- Johnson, Amandus. The Swedes in America 1638-1900: Volume I, The Swedes on the Delaware 1638-1664 (Philadelphia: The Swedish Colonial Society, 1914)
- Johnson, Amandus. The Swedish Settlements on the Delaware 1638-1664, Volume II (Philadelphia: The Swedish Colonial Society, 1927)
- Weslager, C. A. New Sweden on the Delaware: 1638-1655 (Wilmington, DE: The Middle Atlantic Press, 1988)

Political offices
Preceded by Måns Nilsson Kling	Governor of New Sweden; April 1640 - February 1643	Succeeded by Johan Björnsson Printz
