= Jeremiah Basse =

American politician (died 1725)

5th Governor of East & West New Jersey
- In office 7 April 1698 – November 1699
- Deputy: Andrew Bowne
- Preceded by: Andrew Hamilton
- Succeeded by: Andrew Hamilton

1st New Jersey Provincial Secretary
- In office 1703–1715
- Governor: Lord Cornbury, Lord Lovelace, Richard Ingoldesby, Robert Hunter
- Preceded by: Office created
- Succeeded by: James Smith

3rd New Jersey Attorney General
- In office 1719–1723
- Governor: Robert Hunter, William Burnet
- Preceded by: Thomas Gordon
- Succeeded by: James Alexander

Personal details
- Born: England
- Died: 1725 New Jersey
- Occupation: Politician

Jeremiah Basse (died 1725) was a governor of both West Jersey and East Jersey. He became governor of West Jersey in 1697, and became governor of East Jersey in 1697.

Basse was not an effective governor, however, after Andrew Hamilton returned to England in 1698, following an act of parliament which provided that "no other than a natural-born subject of England could serve in any public post of trust or profit." Basse was unable to effectively maintain a good administration during his term of governorship, so finally Hamilton was reappointed as the governor on 19 August 1699.

After being province secretary for Edward Hyde, Lord Cornbury and entering the Cornbury ring, he was convicted during the governorship of John Lovelace for perjury.

== Family history ==
Jeremiah Basse's mother was Mary Basse. Prior to her marriage to Jeremiah's father she was married to John Barkstead.

Jeremiah Basse was the half brother of John, Francis and Joshua Barkstead, John Barkstead, the Barkstead's father was executed 1662, in london for regicide. Jeremiah Basse also had a sister called Hester Basse. Hester married John Lofting 1659-1742 a merchant and manufacturer of engines. Lofting, John (c.1659–1742), merchant and manufacturer of engines, was a native of the Netherlands, one of at least two brothers. He later recorded that he 'lived seven years at Amsterdam with one of the masters of the fire engines there, and is thoroughly acquainted with the methods practised in those parts in quenching of fires' (DNB). He came to England, obtaining grants of free denization in July 1686 and August 1688. At the time of his marriage, at St Nicholas Cole Abbey, London, on 3 May 1689, Lofting was described as a merchant, aged about thirty, and resident in the parish of St Thomas Apostle, London. His wife was Hester Bass of St Michael Queenhithe, London, aged nineteen, sister of Jeremiah Basse, future governor of New Jersey. In June 1689 Lofting enrolled in the Company of Free Shipwrights, paying quarterage until January 1699, thereby becoming a citizen of London.

In 1698 Lofting and Jeremiah Basse shipped goods to Perth Amboy, East New Jersey, in the Hester, a sloop owned by Basse. It discharged without calling at or paying New York customs dues, and the governor of New York seized the ship and sold it. Lofting and Basse appealed to parliament and took legal action, eventually receiving damages and costs of £1890, but not before Lofting was declared bankrupt in March 1700.

== See also ==
- List of governors of New Jersey
