= Thomas Brett (nonjuror) =

English nonjuring clergyman (1667–1743)

Thomas Brett (1667 – 5 March 1743) was an English nonjuring clergyman known as an author.

== Life ==
Born 1667, Brett was the son of Thomas Brett of Spring Grove, Wye, Kent. His father descended from a family settled at Wye; his mother was Letitia, daughter of John Boys of Betshanger, Sandwich, where Brett was born. He was educated at Wye grammar school, under John Paris and Samuel Pratt (later dean of Rochester). On 20 March 1684 he was admitted pensioner of Queens' College, Cambridge. He was removed by his father for extravagance, but permitted to return. He then moved to Corpus Christi College on 17 January 1689. He took the LL.B. degree in 1690.

Brett was ordained deacon on 21 December 1690. After holding a curacy at Folkestone for a year he was ordained priest, and chosen lecturer at Islington. The vicar, Mr. Gery, encouraged him to exchange his early Whiggism for Tory and High Church principles. On the death of his father, his mother persuaded him to return (May 1696) to Spring Grove, where he undertook the cure of Great Chart. Here he married Bridget, daughter of Sir Nicholas Toke. In 1697 he became LL.D., and soon afterwards exchanged Great Chart for Wye. He became rector of Betteshanger on the death of his uncle, Thomas Boys; and on 12 April 1705 Archbishop Thomas Tenison made him rector of Ruckinge, having previously allowed him to hold the small vicarage of Chislet in sequestration.

Brett had up to this point taken the required oaths; but the attempts of his relation Jeffray Gilbert to bring him back to the Whig side had the opposite of the intended effect; and Henry Sacheverell's trial made him decide never to take the oath again. He published a sermon 'on the remission of sins', in 1711, which gave offence by its view of sacerdotal absolution, and was attacked by Dr Robert Cannon in Convocation (22 February 1712). The proposed censure was dropped apparently by the action of Francis Atterbury as prolocutor. In a later sermon 'On the Honour of the Christian Priesthood' he disavowed a belief in auricular confession.

On the accession of King George I, Brett declined to take the oaths, resigned his living, and was received into communion by the nonjuring bishop George Hickes. He afterwards officiated in his own house. He was presented at the assizes for keeping a conventicle, and in 1718 and 1729 complaints were made against him to Archbishop William Wake for interfering with the duties of the parish clergyman. He was, however, let off with a reproof.

Brett was consecrated bishop by the nonjuring bishops Jeremy Collier, Nathaniel Spinckes, and Samuel Hawes, in 1716. He took part in a negotiation which they opened in 1716 with the Greek archbishop of Thebais, then in London, and which continued till 1725, when it was allowed to drop. Brett's account, with copies of a proposed concordat, and letters to the Tsar of Moscovy and his ministers, is given by Thomas Lathbury from the manuscripts of Alexander Jolly. Before a definitive reply had been received from the Greek prelates, the nonjurors had split into two over a controversy. Brett supported Collier in proposing to reinstate the four usages that had been included in the first liturgy of Edward VI. He defended his view in a postscript to his work on 'Tradition' and in an important collection of Liturgies. He took part in related controversies, and joined in consecrating bishops with Collier and Archibald Campbell. In 1727, he consecrated Thomas Brett, junior.

Brett lived quietly in his own house, where he died on 5 March 1743. He had twelve children. His wife died on 7 May 1765; his son, Nicholas, chaplain to Sir Robert Cotton, on 20 August 1776. A detailed account of Brett's life and opinions is given in Henry Broxap's Later Nonjurors.

== Works ==
Brett published many books. They were:

- An Account of Church-Government and Governours, 1701, in which Brett argued that the government of the Church of England is most agreeable to the primitive church; answered by William Nokes in The Beautiful Pattern and Order of the House of God, 1702; republished in an enlarged edition, 1710; answered by John Lewis, in Presbyters not always an authoritative part of Provincial Synods, 1711; to which Brett is said to have replied.
- Two Letters on the Times wherein Marriage is said to be prohibited, 1708.
- Letter to the Author of "Lay Baptism Invalid,", 1711, supporting Roger Laurence and condemning lay baptism). This led to a controversy with Joseph Bingham, who replied in Scholastical History of Lay Baptism, 1712.
- Sermons on Remission of Sins, 1711, reprinted with five others in 1715.
- Review of Lutheran Principles, 1714, answered by John Lewis.
- Vindication of Himself from the Calumnies cast upon him in some News-Papers, falsely charging him with turning Papist, in a letter to the Honourable Archibald Campbell, Esq., 1715.
- Dr. Bennett's Concessions to the Nonjurors proved destructive to the Cause he endeavours to Defend, 1717.
- The Independency of the Church upon the State, as to its pure Spiritual Powers, 1717.
- The Divine Right of Episcopacy, 1718.
- Tradition necessary to explain and interpret the Holy Scriptures, 1718, with answer to John Toland's Nazarenus. The first of several pamphlets related to the "usages" controversy among the nonjurors.
- The Necessity of discerning Christ's Body in the Holy Communion, 1720.
- Collection of the Principal Liturgies used by the Christian Church, 1720; a collection of liturgies edited with a mind to justifying the liturgical reforms of the usager nonjurors.
- Discourses concerning the ever blessed Trinity, 1720.
- Contributions to the Bibliotheca Literaria, Nos. 1, 2, 4, and 8, on University Degrees, English Translations of the Bible, and Arithmetical Figures.
- Instruction to a Person newly Confirmed, 1725.
- Chronological Essay on the Sacred History, 1729.
- General History of the World, 1732.
- Answer to "Plain Account of the Sacrament", 1735, against Benjamin Hoadly.
- Some Remarks on Dr. Waterland's "Review of the Doctrine of the Eucharist", 1738.
- A Supplement to the Remarks on the Reverend Dr. Waterland's Review of the Doctrine of the Eucharist, 1738
- Four Letters on Necessity of Episcopal Communion, 1743.
- Life of John Johnson, prefixed to his posthumous tracts in 1748.

There are also sermons and tracts. There is a letter of his to Dr. Warren, of Trinity Hall, in Francis Peck's Desiderata Curiosa (lib. vii. p. 13). Three letters of his on the difference between Anglican and Catholic tenets were published from the manuscripts of Thomas Bowdler in 1850; and a short essay on suffragan bishops and rural deans was edited by J. Fendall from the manuscript in 1858.

He also contributed some notes to Zachary Grey's edition of Hudibras (published 1744).

== Notes ==
Attribution

This article incorporates text from a publication now in the public domain: "Brett, Thomas". Dictionary of National Biography. London: Smith, Elder & Co. 1885–1900.
