= Måns Nilsson Kling =

Swedish colonial governor

Måns Nilsson Kling or Mauno Kling was a Swedish military officer who was the second governor of New Sweden, the 17th century colony in America, which he administrated from Fort Christina (now Wilmington, Delaware, United States).

== Biography ==
The first Swedish expedition to North America with Fogel Grip and Kalmar Nyckel was launched from the port city of Gothenburg in late 1637. The expedition was organized and overseen by Swedish Admiral Clas Fleming. Samuel Blommaert, a Dutch colonial patron, assisted with the fitting-out. Following the recommendation of Willem Usselincx, one of the directors of the Dutch West India Company, Swedish Chancellor Axel Oxenstierna appointed Peter Minuit to lead the expedition. Minuit made arrangements to found a Swedish colony on the lower Delaware River in parts of the present-day states of Delaware, New Jersey, and Pennsylvania, within the territory later claimed by the Dutch. The first settlers, (Swedes, Finns, and some Dutchmen) reached the location now known as Swedes' Landing in Wilmington, Delaware on March 29, 1638. Peter Minuit became the first governor of the newly established colony of New Sweden. However, Minuit left the colony on June 15, 1638, and sailed to the Caribbean Island of St. Christopher to barter a ship's cargo of wine and aquavit for tobacco. Minuit died there during a hurricane.

Måns Kling had arrived with the first expedition and was left in command of New Sweden following the departure of Peter Minuit. Kling, who had been promoted to captain, carried out the duties of governor until Lieutenant Peter Hollander Ridder of the Swedish Navy, arrived in New Sweden on April 17, 1640.

Kling is believed to have been from the Swedish province of Småland; only one officer named Måns Nilsson occurs in the military lists of the times. The Måns Nilsson in question had served in Adolf Hård's Regiment in Jönköping, Småland, first as a private and then as an officer, before being discharged in 1636. He may also have been of Finnish origin, since Finland was part of the Realm of Sweden at the time.

== See also ==
- Swedish colonization of the Americas
- Swedish overseas colonies

== Other sources ==
- Jameson, J. Franklin (1887). Willem Usselinx: Founder of the Dutch and Swedish West India Companies. G.P. Putnam's Sons.
- Johnson, Amandus (1927). The Swedes on the Delaware. Philadelphia: International Printing Company.
- Munroe, John A. (1977). Colonial Delaware. Delaware Heritage Press, Wilmington.
- Mickley, Joseph J. (1881). Some account of William Usselinx and Peter Minuit: Two individuals who were instrumental in establishing the first permanent colony in Delaware. The Historical Society of Delaware.
- Weslager, C. A. (1988). New Sweden on the Delaware 1638–1655. Wilmington, Delaware: Middle Atlantic Press.

Political offices
Preceded by Peter Minuit	Governor of New Sweden; June 15, 1638 - April 17, 1640	Succeeded by Peter Hollander Ridder
