= Philip Carteret (colonial governor) =

Jersey-born colonial governor of New Jersey and East Jersey

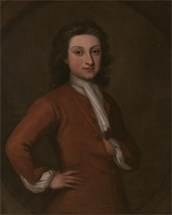

1ºProprietary Governor of New Jersey
- In office 1665 – July 1673
- Deputy: John Berry
- Preceded by: Office created
- Succeeded by: Anthony Colve (New Netherland)

1ºGovernor of East New Jersey
- In office November 1674 – February 1682
- Preceded by: Anthony Colve (New Netherland)
- Succeeded by: Robert Barclay

Personal details
- Born: 1639 Manoir de la Hougue, Jersey
- Died: December 1682 (aged 42–43) Elizabethtown, East Jersey (Now Elizabeth Township, New Jersey)
- Spouse: Elizabeth Smith
- Profession: Governor
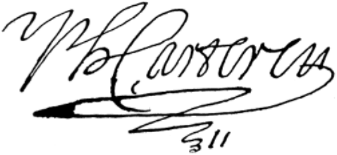
- Signature

Philip Carteret; French: Philippe de Carteret; (1639–1682) was the first Governor of New Jersey as an English proprietary colony, from 1665 to 1673 and governor of East Jersey from 1674 to 1682.

== Career ==
The English annexed the Dutch province of New Netherland in 1664, and lands west of Long Island and Manhattan Island were awarded to two Lords Proprietors, John Berkeley and George Carteret (cousin of Philip). In 1665, Carteret (or "Cartaret") was appointed by them to take possession of the newly acquired territory which been renamed the Province of New Caesaria, or New Jersey, and assume the position of governor.

George Carteret and Berkeley issued the Concessions and Agreements of the Proprietors of New Jersey, the "most liberal grant of political privileges made by any English colonial proprietor to the people". Freedom of conscience was guaranteed and generous land grants were promised. Carteret indeed issued many grants of lands to settlers and landowners, partly with the purpose of increasing the worth of the colony. The pair "expected to profit from sales of their rich North American land holdings, and they were not disappointed".

Governor Philip Carteret designated Elizabethtown (named after the wife of George Carteret) as the capital of New Jersey, where a representative assembly first met in 1668. Middletown Township and Shrewsbury Township refused to send representatives to this New Jersey Assembly and declared their independence, electing James Carteret as their leader. Carteret became angry and left for England, and had the English government force the New Jersey settlers to pay quitrents.

Carteret found the province inhabited by "a few hundred Dutchmen and English Puritans". During his governorship, more towns sprang up in New Jersey. By the end of his term in 1682 the province consisted of seven towns, and many outlying plantations. The populations (exclusive of Lenape natives) was about 3500 in the seven established towns of Berghen, Newarke, Elizabeth Towne, Woodbridge, Piscattawy and Middletown, with an undetermined number in outlying areas.

After the death of George Carteret, Governor Edmund Andros of New York attempted to seize power in East Jersey. When Philip Carteret refused to give up his position as governor, Andros sent a raiding party to his home on April 30th, 1680 and had him beaten, arrested and transported to New York. Carteret was placed on trial in May, but was acquitted by the jury. The attack caused permanent injuries to Carteret, and he died a little over 2 1/2 years later in December 1682.

== See also ==
- Bergen, New Netherland
- List of colonial governors of New Jersey
- East Jersey

Government offices
Preceded by none	Governor of New Jersey under the Proprietors; 1665 – 1673	Succeeded by Anthony Colve (New Netherland)
Preceded by Anthony Colve (New Netherland)	Governor of East Jersey; 1674 – 1682	Succeeded by Robert Barclay
