= Joseph Bingham =

English scholar and divine (1668–1723)

Joseph Bingham (September 1668 – 17 August 1723) was an English scholar and divine, who wrote on ecclesiastical history.

== Life ==
He was born at Wakefield in Yorkshire.

He was educated at Wakefield Grammar School and University College, Oxford, of which he was made fellow in 1689 and tutor in 1691. A sermon preached by him from the university pulpit in St Mary's church, on the meaning of the terms Person and Substance in the Fathers, brought upon him an accusation of heresy. He was compelled to give up his fellowship and leave the university; but he was immediately presented by Dr John Radcliffe to the rectory of Headbourne Worthy, near Winchester (1695).

In this country retirement he began his extensive work entitled Origines Ecclesiasticae, or Antiquities of the Christian Church, the first volume of which appeared in 1708 and the tenth and last in 1722. His design, learnedly, exhaustively and impartially executed, was to give such a methodical account of the antiquities of the Christian Church as others have done of the Greek and Roman and Jewish antiquities, by reducing the ancient customs, usages and practices of the church under certain proper heads, whereby the reader may take a view at once of any particular usage or custom of Christians for four or five centuries.

Notwithstanding his learning and merit, Bingham received no higher preferment than that of Headbourne Worthy until 1712, when he was collated to the rectory of Havant, near Portsmouth, by Sir Jonathan Trelawney, bishop of Winchester. Nearly all his little property was lost in the great South Sea Bubble of 1720.

A grandson was Bishop Richard Mant of Down and Dromore.

He is buried in the churchyard of St Swithun's, Headbourne Worthy.
