= Concession and Agreement =

Document on religious freedom in Province of New Jersey

Concession and Agreement (full title: The Concession and Agreement of the Lords Proprietors of the Province of New Caesarea, or New Jersey, to and With All and Every the Adventurers and All Such as Shall Settle or Plant There) was a 1664 document that provided religious freedom in the colony of New Jersey. It was issued as a proclamation for the structure of the government for the colony written in 1664 by the two proprietors, Lord John Berkeley and Sir George Carteret.

The document promised religious freedom to all inhabitants of New Jersey, and also declared that the proprietors would be in charge of appointing the provincial governors. The first such governor to be appointed was Philip Carteret. The goal of the document was to entice more settlers to farm in New Jersey, so that the two proprietors could earn more profit by collecting quit-rents, annual fees paid on granted lands. To encourage such settlement, they allowed religious freedom, which was not available under the policies of the English government. Penal law (British)#Clarendon Code

== See also ==
- Colonial history of New Jersey
- Elizabethtown
- Elizabethtown Tract
- East Jersey
- West Jersey
- List of colonial governors of New Jersey
