= East Jersey =

English possession in North America (1674–1702)

Coordinates: 40.467°N 74.333°W

Province of East Jersey
- 1674–1702
- Flag

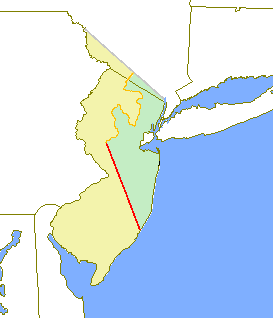
- The original provinces of West and East Jersey are shown in yellow and green, respectively. The Keith Line is shown in red, and the Coxe–Barclay Line is shown in orange.
- Status: Colony of Kingdom of England
- Capital: Perth Amboy
- Common languages: English, Dutch
- Religion: Puritanism
- Government: Proprietary colony
- Lord Proprietor
  - 1674-1680: Sir George Carteret (initial)
- Governor
  - 1674–1682: Philip Carteret (first)
  - 1699–1702: Andrew Hamilton (last)
- History
  - Established: 1674
  - Disestablished: 1702
Preceded by	Succeeded by
Province of New Jersey	Province of New Jersey; Dominion of New England

The Province of East Jersey, along with the Province of West Jersey, between 1674 and 1702 in accordance with the Quintipartite Deed, were two distinct political divisions of the Province of New Jersey, which became the U.S. state of New Jersey. The two provinces were amalgamated in 1702. East Jersey's capital was located at Perth Amboy. Determination of an exact location for a border between West Jersey and East Jersey was often a matter of dispute.

Between 1664 and 1674, most settlement was from other parts of the Americas, especially New England, Long Island, and the West Indies. Elizabethtown and Newark in particular had a strong Puritan character. South of the Raritan River the Monmouth Tract was developed primarily by Quakers from Long Island. In 1675, East Jersey was partitioned into four counties for administrative purposes: Bergen County, Essex County, Middlesex County, and Monmouth County. There were seven established towns: Shrewsbury, Middleton, Piscataway, Woodbridge, Elizabethtown, Newark, and Bergen. In a survey taken in 1684, the population was estimated to be 3,500 individuals in about 700 families (African slaves were not included).

Although a number of the East Jersey proprietors in England were Quakers and the governor through most of the 1680s was the leading Quaker Robert Barclay, the Quaker influence on government was not significant. Even the immigration instigated by Barclay was oriented toward promoting Scottish influence more than Quaker influence. In 1682, Barclay and the other Scottish proprietors began the development of Perth Amboy as the capital of the province. In 1687, James II permitted ships to be cleared at Perth Amboy.

Frequent disputes between the residents and the mostly-absentee proprietors over land ownership and quitrents plagued the province until its surrender to Queen Anne's government in 1702.

Summary of Boundary Lines
Date	Boundary Name	Description
1674	Original Duke of York Line (did not recognize John Fenwick's holdings)	Barnegat Bay to Rancocas Creek on the Delaware River just north of present-day Philadelphia.
1676	Quintipartite Deed Line (between George Carteret on the East, and William Penn, Gawen Lawrie, Nicholas Lucas, and Edward Byllynge on the West, except for 10% to John Fenwick)	On the north from a point 41° 40' latitude on the Delaware River extending southward on a straight and direct line to the east side of Little Egg Harbor.
1687	William Emley / John Reid Adjustment (commissioners from West and East Jersey respectively)	Adjusted description on the Delaware fifty minutes more westerly due to magnetic compass variation
1687	Keith Line aka Province Line (Surveyed north only to the south branch of the Raritan River)	Stopped by Governor Daniel Coxe of West Jersey and Governor Robert Barclay of East Jersey
1688	Coxe-Barclay Line Survey	Extended the Keith Line from the Raritan River along specific properties that defined the eastern boundaries of present- day Morris and Sussex Counties and the northern border of Somerset County
1696	Thornton Line Survey	Attempted to correct errors from previous surveys
1702	East and West Jersey United	Violence became so obsessive, that East and West proprietors gave up their individual governing rights to Queen Anne
1743	Lawrence Line Survey (Land ownership disputes continued. West Jersey proprietors attempted to fund survey but failed. East Jersey Proprietors then hired John Lawrence)	Adopted by NJ supreme court in 1855 as the final arbiter of all land disputes. Today defines boundary for Walpack, Sandyston, Stillwater, Hampton, and Green Townships

== Constitution ==
See: History of the New Jersey State Constitution#East Jersey Constitution

== Governors of East Jersey (1674–1702) ==
Philip Carteret	1674–1682	
Robert Barclay	1682–1688	
Edmund Andros	1688–1689	Governed as the Dominion of New England
Andrew Hamilton	1692–1697	
Jeremiah Basse	1698–1699	
Andrew Hamilton	1699–1702	

== See also ==
- Concession and Agreement
- List of colonial governors of New Jersey
- Scottish colonization of the Americas
- Province of New York
- Dominion of New England
