= Schraalenburgh =

Schraalenburgh may refer to:

- Dumont, New Jersey
- South Schraalenburgh Church
- Schraalenburgh North Church
