= Hackensack =

Hackensack most commonly refers to the U.S. city of Hackensack, New Jersey, the county seat of Bergen County.

It may also refer to:

== People ==
- Hackensack people, a Native American tribe from the area now known as the Gateway Region of northeastern New Jersey, U.S.

== Places ==
- Hackensack, Minnesota, U.S.
- Hackensack River, in New York and New Jersey, U.S.
- Hackensack Township, New Jersey, a former township in Bergen County, New Jersey
- Hackensack University Medical Center, a highly specialized tertiary-care hospital in Hackensack, New Jersey

== Songs ==
- "Hackensack", a song by Fountains of Wayne from the 2003 album Welcome Interstate Managers
  - "Hackensack", a cover on MTV Unplugged (Katy Perry EP), 2009
- "Hackensack", a composition by Thelonious Monk (1917–1982)
