= Walter Christie =

Walter Christie may refer to:

- Walter Christie (mayor) (1863–1941), founder, and mayor, of Bergenfield, New Jersey
- Walter Christie (physician) (born 1942), American physician and novelist
- Walter John Christie (1905–1986), British colonial civil servant
- J. Walter Christie (1865–1944), American engineer and inventor
