= Arvin Amatorio =

Mayor of Bergenfield, New Jersey

- Amatorio in 2024
- Born: Baler, Aurora, Philippines
- Education: Harvard University, San Sebastian College-Recoletos, Colegio De San Juan De Letran
- Occupations: Attorney, politician
- Title: Mayor of Bergenfield, New Jersey
- Term: 2020-Present
- Political party: Democratic Party
- Spouse: Ilya Evangelista-Amatorio
- Children: Lance and Andrew

Arvin Amatorio (born June 5, 1971) is a Filipino-American attorney and politician, currently serving his second term as the mayor of Bergenfield, New Jersey. Amatorio ran unopposed during his reelection in the November 2023 general elections. A member of the Democratic Party, he previously served as a two-term councilman and council president.

== Early life and education ==
Amatorio was born and raised in Baler, Aurora, Philippines, to public school teachers. He earned a degree in economics from Colegio de San Juan de Letran and later obtained a Juris Doctor from San Sebastian College in Manila. Amatorio immigrated to the United States in 2002. He holds a Master's of Liberal Arts in International Relations with a focus in National Security Analysis from Harvard University.

== Career ==
While still in the Philippines, Amatorio worked at the Department of the Interior and Local Government (DILG) in 1996. He later worked at the Economic Intelligence and Investigation Bureau under the Department of Finance.

After immigrating to the United States in 2002, he was admitted to practice law in New York in 2006. He is also admitted to practice in both the US Southern District and the Eastern District Courts of New York.

From 2006, he practiced immigration law in New York, became a litigation lawyer, and later opened his immigration law office in Bergenfield, New Jersey.

His early career involved defending the Filipino nurses in the civil case, known as the "Sentosa Case" after they were sued by their recruitment agency and medical facilities in New York State court. Amatorio also represented the Republic of the Philippines through the Presidential Commission on Good Government (PCGG) during the forfeiture cases filed by the Philippines, in this case the US Southern District Court of New York, specifically concerning the claim on a piece of Claude Monet's Water Lily painting and other properties sold by former First Lady Imelda Marcos secretary Vilma ⁣⁣Bautista⁣⁣. Except for Water Lily, the other claimants, including the Class (Human Rights victims) represented by Robert Swift, Golden Buddha Corporation, the company that substituted Rogelio Roxas, and the family of Vilma Bautista, reached a court settlement.

=== Political career ===
A member of the Democratic Party, Amatorio was first elected to the Bergenfield Borough Council, serving two terms as councilman and council president in 2015 and 2018. He was considered as a replacement for former Assemblyman Joseph Lagana in New Jersey's 38th legislative district.

In 2019, he was elected mayor of Bergenfield, He defeated two-time incumbent Republican Mayor Norman Schmelz in a fiercely contested race, prompting Amatorio to file a defamation lawsuit against Schmelz.

Amatorio was re-elected mayor of Bergenfield in 2023, running unopposed. Amatorio is also the Bergenfield Municipal Chairman of the Democratic Committee of Bergen County.In 2024, Amatorio was selected as a Democratic district delegate from New Jersey’s 19th delegate district, covering portions of Bergen and Passaic counties, for the 2024 Democratic National Convention.

Following his 2019 election, Amatorio sparked controversy by choosing not to re-appoint a long-serving municipal judge, instead appointing Franklin Montero, Bergenfield's first-ever Latino judge, who also became the only Hispanic Municipal judge in Bergen County at that time. Bergenfield previously appointed Cathy Madalone, the first female Police Chief, and later Mustafa Rabboh, the first Muslim Police Chief in Bergen County, which Amatorio both supported as a council member.

In early 2022, despite opposition from critics citing cost, Amatorio pushed for the construction of the new Borough Hall, which had been debated for more than a decade. Amatorio was later sworn in at the new building in January 2024, marking his second term and the first official use of the new Borough Hall after overseeing its construction.

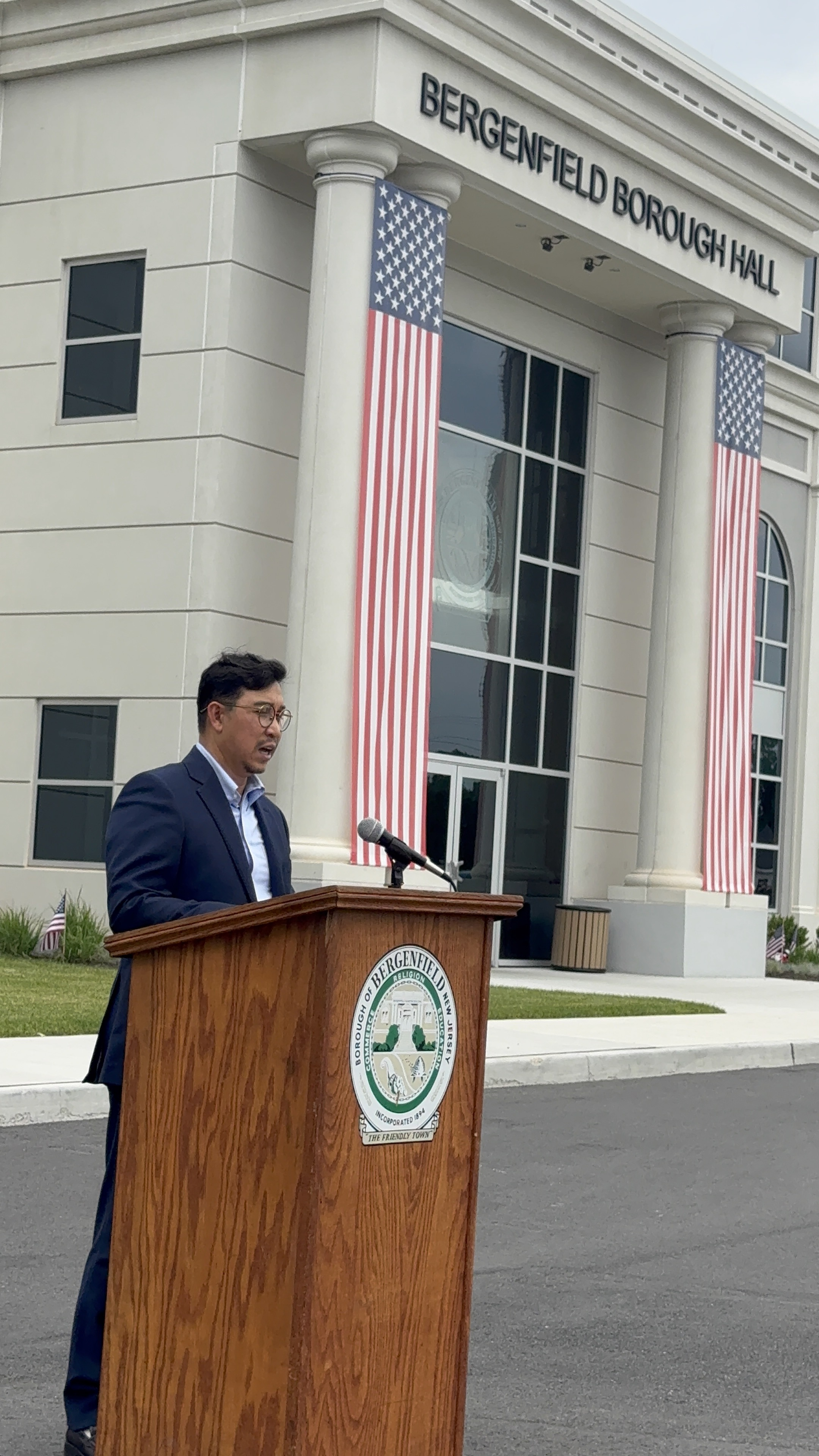
Mayor Arvin Amatorio is speaking at Bergenfield Borough Hall during the celebration of Mental Health Awareness Month.

Amatorio advocated redevelopment and revitalization of the business district, a move that brought opposition fearing congestion and could increase population in the school district. In 2023, Amatorio and the Bergenfield Council commenced construction on a multi-purpose field costing more than $4 million, utilizing the $2.6 million grant received for the project. This decision raised concerns about potential tax increases after Amatorio and the Borough Council spent over half a million dollars upgrading 12 parks in Bergenfield with new equipment.

During Amatorio's second term, Bergenfield expanded its Mayor's Wellness Campaign, offering programs focused on physical health, mental and social well-being, preventive care, and financial wellness. In 2025, theNew Jersey Health Care Quality Institute designated Bergenfield a “Healthy Town” for the second consecutive year. The institute reported that the borough engaged more than 12,000 residents through over 130 wellness classes and events during the year.

Amatorio also initiated and supported efforts for the Bergenfield Public School District to incorporate the history of Filipino soldiers who served alongside American forces during World War II into the district's curriculum. The initiative was featured by CUNY TV's Asian American Life in 2024 and involved retired U.S. Army Major General Antonio Taguba, Bergenfield Superintendent Christopher Tully, and Mayor Amatorio.

== Personal life ==
Amatorio met his wife, Ilya Evangelista Amatorio, while working at the DILG in the Philippines in 1996. Ilya Evangelista Amatorio is a longtime nurse manager and administrator at one of the largest hospital systems in the State of New York. She holds a master’s degree in Nursing Management and Executive Leadership from Columbia University. She has also served on the Board of Trustees of Care Plus Bergen Inc. and has been actively involved in community health and wellness initiatives in Bergenfield, New Jersey. They have two children, Lance and Andrew.

He is a member of Lex Talionis Fraternitas, and the Grand Lodge of Free & Accepted Masons of the State of New York, Jose Rizal Lodge 1132. He is also a Chapter Commander of the Knights of Rizal, Bergenfield Chapter.

== See also ==
- Filipinos in the New York metropolitan area
