= Urban Decay (film) =

- Directed by: Harry Basil
- Screenplay by: Don Adams; Harry James Picardi
- Produced by: Jeff Klein; Alan Ostroff; Pat Sicilliano
- Starring: Dean Cain; Brooke Burns; Chris Williams; Ryan Francis; Tim Thomerson; Meat Loaf
- Cinematography: Howard Wexler
- Edited by: Don Adams; Harry James Picardi
- Music by: Pete Karr
- Distributed by: Arsenal Pictures
- Release date: 2007
- Country: United States
- Language: English

Urban Decay is a 2007 horror film directed by Harry Basil and starring Dean Cain.

== Plot ==
Cab driver Stan slams into a homeless man who gets up and walks away, leaving behind a scarf covered with writhing maggots. Obsessed with the mystery, Stan hunts the figure through the city, discovering a trail of mangled, half-eaten victims, and an urban legend: Puss Head was a sewer worker who came back from an uncharted tunnel changed into something both living and dead. Parents warn their children that the shuffling zombie will get them if they stay out on the streets too late. But as the body count rises, Stan finds that the legend is alive and hungry.

== Cast ==
- Dean Cain as Stan
- Brooke Burns as Sasha
- Chris Williams as "2-Much"
- Ryan Francis as "E-Nuff"
- Tim Thomerson as Detective Thompson
- Meat Loaf as Rick "Zero"
- Darris Love as "Da Bomb"

== Release ==
The film was offered for distribution at the Marché du Film.
