= Hackensack Township, New Jersey =

Former township in the United States

Coordinates: 40.89°N 73.97°W

Hackensack Township was a township that was formed in 1693 within Bergen County, New Jersey. The township was created by the New Jersey Legislature as one of the first group of townships in New Jersey. Bergen County, which had been created in 1682, was thus split into two parts: Hackensack Township to the north, and Bergen Township to the south.

Historical population
Census	Pop.	Note	%±
1810	1,918		—
1820	2,076		8.2%
1830	2,200		6.0%
1840	2,631		19.6%
1850	3,506		33.3%
1860	5,488		56.5%
1870	8,038		46.5%
Population sources: 1810-1870 1840; 1850-1870 1850 1870

Despite its name, Hackensack Township did not encompass the present-day city of Hackensack, which was within New Barbadoes Township on the west side of the Hackensack River.

As originally constituted on October 31, 1693, the township included portions of present-day Bergen County between the Hudson River on the east and the Hackensack River to the west, northward to the boundary with New York and south to the border with current Hudson County.

In 1775, Harrington Township was formed by royal charter from the northern portions of both New Barbadoes Township and Hackensack Township.

On March 22, 1871, Hackensack Township was subdivided into three new townships, each stretching from the Hudson River on the east to the Hackensack River in the west. The northern portion became Palisades Township, the center strip became Englewood Township, and the southern portion became Ridgefield Township. With the creation of these three new townships, Hackensack Township was dissolved that same day, March 22, 1871.

== Sources ==
- Municipal Incorporations of the State of New Jersey (according to Counties) prepared by the Division of Local Government, Department of the Treasury (New Jersey); December 1, 1958
- Clayton, W. Woodford; and Nelson, William. History of Bergen and Passaic Counties, New Jersey, with Biographical Sketches of Many of its Pioneers and Prominent Men., Philadelphia: Everts and Peck, 1882.
- Harvey, Cornelius Burnham (ed.), Genealogical History of Hudson and Bergen Counties, New Jersey. New York: New Jersey Genealogical Publishing Co., 1900.
- Van Valen, James M. History of Bergen County, New Jersey. New York: New Jersey Publishing and Engraving Co., 1900.
- Westervelt, Frances A. (Frances Augusta), 1858–1942, History of Bergen County, New Jersey, 1630-1923, Lewis Historical Publishing Company, 1923.
