= Englewood Township, New Jersey =

Coordinates: 40.90°N 73.97°W

Englewood Township was a township that existed in Bergen County, New Jersey. It was established on March 22, 1871, when Hackensack Township was subdivided into three new townships. Englewood Township lasted just short of twenty-five years, and was dissolved on March 17, 1899.

Hackensack Township was divided into three parts, each stretching from the Hudson River on the east to the Hackensack River in the west:

- The northernmost portion was Palisades Township;
- The center strip was Englewood Township; and,
- The southernmost portion became Ridgefield Township.

The new township was quickly subdivided. The implementation by the New Jersey Legislature of a new Borough Act served to encourage the creation of new municipalities, most formed from portions of two (or more) townships. Englewood Township did not last long after this new legislation, and the case of "Boroughitis" it fomented.

Bergenfield was created on June 26, 1894, from portions of both Englewood Township and Palisades Township. Teaneck was created from portions of both Englewood Township and Ridgefield Township on February 19, 1895. On May 10, 1895, Englewood Cliffs was created from sections of both Englewood Township and Palisades Township.

On March 17, 1899, the remainder of Englewood Township was combined with parts of Ridgefield Township to form the current city of Englewood, New Jersey. With the creation of the City of Englewood, Englewood Township was dissolved.
