= Ridgefield Township, New Jersey =

Township in Bergen County, New Jersey, US

Coordinates: 40°52′53″N 74°00′50″W

Ridgefield Township was a township that existed in Bergen County, New Jersey. The township was created in 1871, when Hackensack Township was trisected to form Palisades Township in the northernmost third, Englewood Township in the central strip and Ridgefield Township encompassing the southernmost portion, stretching from the Hudson River on the east to the Hackensack River, with Hudson County to the south. Much of the area had been during the colonial area known as the English Neighborhood. As described in the 1882 book, History of Bergen and Passaic counties, New Jersey,

Ridgefield is the first township in Bergen County which the traveler enters in passing up the Palisades. His first impressions are much like those of old Hendrick Hudson in speaking of a wider extent of country: "A very good land to fall in with, and a pleasant land to see." The valley of the Hackensack invited early settlers in the seventeenth century, and the valley of the Overpeck Creek, a navigable arm of the Hackensack, also attracted settlers quite as early in this direction. Sloops and schooners can pass up this creek nearly to the northern boundary of the township. Ridgefield is bounded on the north by Englewood, on the east by the Hudson, on the south by Hudson County, and on the west by the Hackensack River. The southern boundary is less than two miles in extent, and the northern less than four, and the length of the township from north to south does not exceed four miles. Bellman's Creek, forming part of the southern boundary, the Hackensack, the Overpeck, the Hudson, with more than a dozen other smaller streams and rivulets, bountifully supply the whole township with water. From the western border of the Palisades the land descends to the Overpeck, forming a most beautiful valley, with the land again rising to a high ridge midway between the Overpeck and the Hackensack. From this long ridge, extending far to the north beyond this township, it took its name of Ridgefield.

The New York, Susquehanna and Western, formerly the Midland Railroad, the Jersey City and Albany Railroad, and the Northern Railway of New Jersey—all running northward through the township— afford ample railroad accommodations. The Susquehanna enters the township at Bellman's Creek, and the Northern at about one hundred feet south of the creek, and at a point north and east of the Susquehanna. The Albany road in this locality is not yet constructed, diverging at present from the track of the Susquehanna between Little Ferry and Bogota stations. It has, however, an independent line projected and now under construction to New York City.

Early Settlements. Ridgefield embraces the earliest settlements in the ancient township of Hackensack, antedating even the organization of that township in 1693, and of the county of Bergen in 1675. There seems to have been no town or village compactly built, like the village of Bergen, but there were settlements both of Dutch and English in and about what was subsequently known as English Neighborhood prior to 1675. The Westervelts, the Zimcrmans, the Bantas, and the Blauvelts, all coming from Holland, settled in the middle of the seventeenth century in that locality. The ancestors of Jacob P. Westervelt, now of Hackensack Village, with himself, were born in English Neighborhood. His father was born there in 1776, and was the son of Christopher Westervelt, who was born there certainly as early as 1690, and he was the son of the original ancestor of this family, who came from Holland and settled on Overpeck Creek, within the present limits of Ridgefield township, probably about 1670.

In 1878, the New Jersey Legislature provided for the formation of a borough within a township not exceeding four square miles. Three years later, Rutherford became the first borough to be formed under that Act when it separated from Union Township to the southwest of Ridgefield. Ridgefield Borough was set off from Ridgefield Township in 1892, and Ridgefield Park Village was formed within the township that same year.

The passage of a revised Borough Act resulted in a flurry of subdivision of new boroughs. Municipalities created from Ridgefield Township (or portions thereof) were Bogota (1894), Leonia (1894), Undercliff (1894; renamed to "Edgewater" in 1899), Fairview (1894), Teaneck (part) (1895), Cliffside Park (1895), Englewood (part) (1895), Palisades Park (1899). The creation of Fort Lee, New Jersey, on April 18, 1904, put an end to Ridgefield Township.
