= Bergenfield, New Jersey =

Borough in Bergen County, New Jersey, US

- Borough
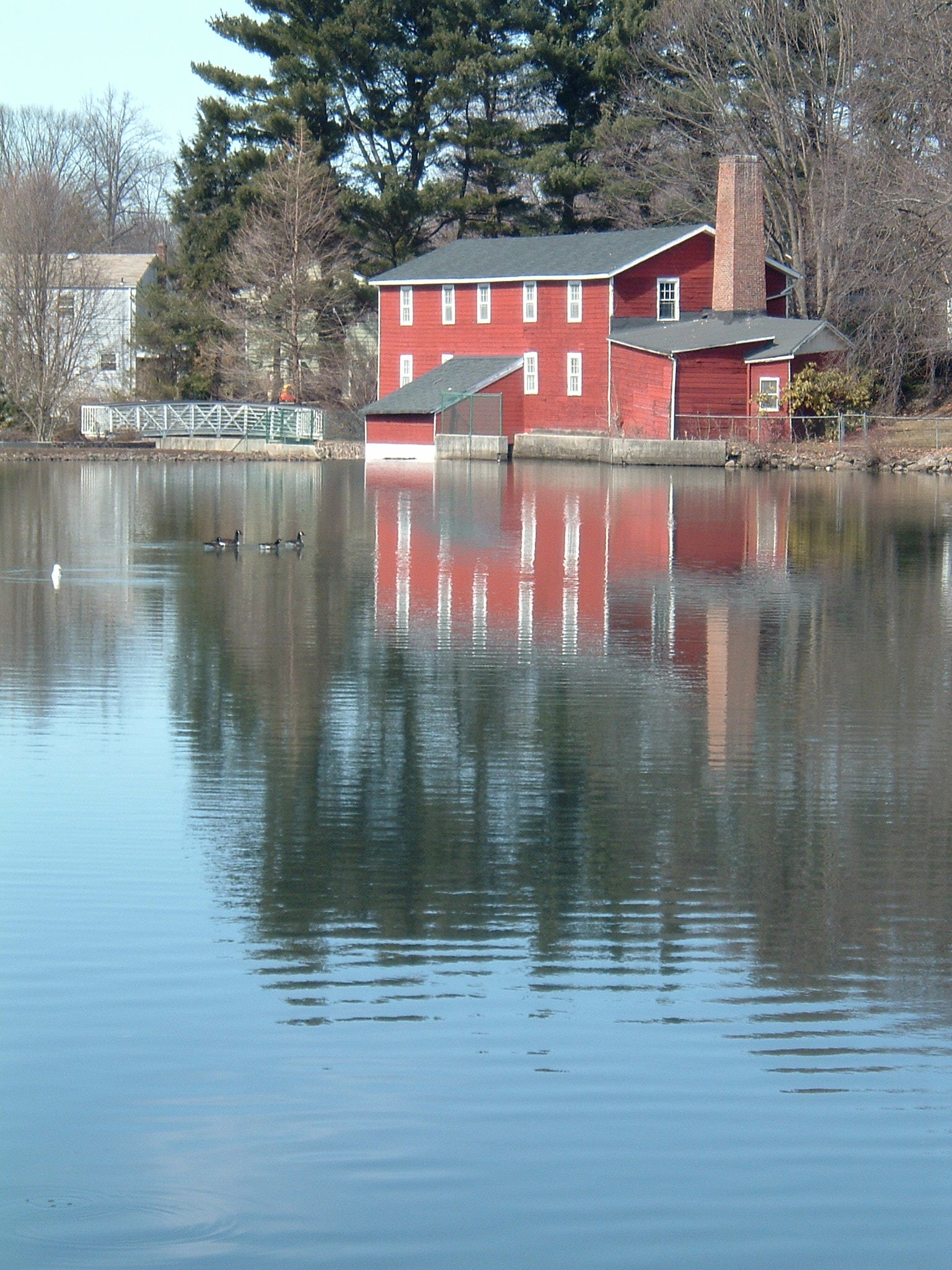
- Cooper's Pond

- Seal

- Location of Bergenfield in Bergen County highlighted in red (left). Inset map: Location of Bergen County in New Jersey highlighted in orange (right).

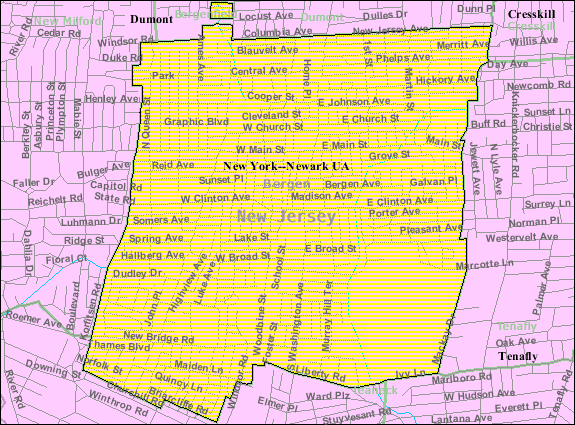
- Census Bureau map of Bergenfield, New Jersey

- Location in Bergen County Location in New Jersey Location in the United States
- Coordinates: 40.922334°N 73.998001°W
- Country: United States
- State: New Jersey
- County: Bergen
- Incorporated: June 25, 1894

Government
  - Type: Borough
  - Body: Borough Council
  - Mayor: Arvin Amatorio (D, term ends December 31, 2027)
  - Administrator: Corey Gallo
  - Municipal clerk: Marie Quiñones-Wilson

Area
  - Total: 2.92 sq mi (7.55 km^{2})
  - Land: 2.90 sq mi (7.52 km^{2})
  - Water: 0.0077 sq mi (0.02 km^{2}) 0.31%
  - Rank: 338th of 565 in state 28th of 70 in county
- Elevation: 66 ft (20 m)

Population (2020)
  - Total: 28,321
  - Estimate (2023): 28,274
  - Rank: 87th of 565 in state 7th of 70 in county
  - Density: 9,752.4/sq mi (3,765.4/km^{2})
  - Rank: 39th of 565 in state 11th of 70 in county
- Time zone: UTC−05:00 (Eastern (EST))
  - Summer (DST): UTC−04:00 (Eastern (EDT))
- ZIP Code: 07621
- Area code: 201
- FIPS code: 3400305170
- GNIS feature ID: 0885157
- Website: bergenfieldnj.gov

Bergenfield is a borough in Bergen County, in the U.S. state of New Jersey. As of the 2020 United States census, the borough's population was 28,321, an increase of 1,557 (+5.8%) from the 2010 census count of 26,764, which in turn reflected an increase of 517 (+2.0%) from the 26,247 counted in the 2000 census.

New Jersey Monthly magazine ranked Bergenfield as its 211th best place to live in its 2010 rankings of the "Best Places To Live" in New Jersey. The magazine ranked Bergenfield as its 231st best place to live in its 2008 rankings of the "Best Places To Live".

Neighborhood Scout named Bergenfield as the safest municipality in the nation in 2012 with more than 25,000 residents and in both 2013 and 2014 they named it as the 2nd safest town in the US only behind Franklin, Massachusetts. In 2019, Bergenfield has dropped in their ratings, falling to number 4.

== History ==
Bergenfield was formed on the basis of a referendum held on June 25, 1894, from portions of Englewood Township and Palisades Township. The borough was formed during the "Boroughitis" phenomenon then sweeping through Bergen County, in which 26 boroughs were formed in the county in 1894 alone. The borough was named for its location in Bergen County.

== Geography ==
According to the United States Census Bureau, the borough had a total area of 2.91 square miles (7.55 km^{2}), including 2.90 square miles (7.52 km^{2}) of land and 0.01 square miles (0.02 km^{2}) of water (0.31%).

The borough borders the Bergen County municipalities of Cresskill, Dumont, Englewood, New Milford, Teaneck and Tenafly.

== Demographics ==
Historical population
Census	Pop.	Note	%±
1900	729		—
1910	1,991		173.1%
1920	3,667		84.2%
1930	8,816		140.4%
1940	10,275		16.5%
1950	17,647		71.7%
1960	27,203		54.2%
1970	29,000		6.6%
1980	25,568		−11.8%
1990	24,458		−4.3%
2000	26,247		7.3%
2010	26,764		2.0%
2020	28,321		5.8%
2023 (est.)	28,274	▼	−0.2%
Population sources: 1900–1920 1900–1910; 1910–1930 1900–2020; 2000 2010 2020

Bergenfield has been called the Little Manila of Bergen County. Of the 14,224 Filipino population in the county as a whole enumerated in the 2000 Census, 3,133 (22% of the county total) lived in Bergenfield. By the 2010 Census, 4,569 Bergenfield residents (17.1% of the population) listed themselves as being of Filipino ancestry, and increasing further to 5,062 (18.4%) by 2016.

A growing Jewish community in Bergenfield and neighboring Teaneck is comprised of Modern Orthodox Jews.

=== Racial and ethnic composition ===
Bergenfield borough, Bergen County, New Jersey – Racial and ethnic composition Note: the US Census treats Hispanic/Latino as an ethnic category. This table excludes Latinos from the racial categories and assigns them to a separate category. Hispanics/Latinos may be of any race.
Race / Ethnicity (NH = Non-Hispanic)	Pop 2000	Pop 2010	Pop 2020	% 2000	% 2010	% 2020
White alone (NH)	14,165	10,546	9,278	53.97%	39.40%	32.76%
Black or African American alone (NH)	1,665	1,724	1,894	6.34%	6.44%	6.69%
Native American or Alaska Native alone (NH)	39	32	30	0.15%	0.12%	0.11%
Asian alone (NH)	5,327	6,778	7,222	20.30%	25.33%	25.50%
Native Hawaiian or Pacific Islander alone (NH)	4	9	0	0.02%	0.03%	0.00%
Other race alone (NH)	105	59	244	0.40%	0.22%	0.86%
Mixed race or Multiracial (NH)	468	519	532	1.78%	1.94%	1.88%
Hispanic or Latino (any race)	4,474	7,097	9,121	17.05%	26.52%	32.21%
Total	26,247	26,764	28,321	100.00%	100.00%	100.00%

=== 2020 census ===
As of the 2020 census, Bergenfield had a population of 28,321. The median age was 40.1 years. 22.5% of residents were under the age of 18 and 16.1% of residents were 65 years of age or older. For every 100 females there were 92.8 males, and for every 100 females age 18 and over there were 89.9 males age 18 and over.

100.0% of residents lived in urban areas, while 0.0% lived in rural areas.

There were 9,097 households in Bergenfield, of which 36.6% had children under the age of 18 living in them. Of all households, 57.4% were married-couple households, 13.5% were households with a male householder and no spouse or partner present, and 24.8% were households with a female householder and no spouse or partner present. About 18.6% of all households were made up of individuals and 9.2% had someone living alone who was 65 years of age or older.

There were 9,387 housing units, of which 3.1% were vacant. The homeowner vacancy rate was 1.1% and the rental vacancy rate was 3.0%.

=== 2010 census ===
The 2010 United States census counted 26,765 people, 8,852 households, and 6,816 families in the borough. The population density was 9,306.5 per square mile (3,593.3/km^{2}). There were 9,200 housing units at an average density of 3,199.1 per square mile (1,235.2/km^{2}). The racial makeup was 52.42% (14,029) White, 7.70% (2,060) Black or African American, 0.31% (84) Native American, 25.60% (6,851) Asian, 0.05% (13) Pacific Islander, 10.12% (2,709) from other races, and 3.80% (1,018) from two or more races. Hispanic or Latino residents of any race were 26.52% (7,097) of the population.

Of the 8,852 households, 35.5% had children under the age of 18; 58.7% were married couples living together; 13.7% had a female householder with no husband present and 23.0% were non-families. Of all households, 19.4% were made up of individuals and 8.9% had someone living alone who was 65 years of age or older. The average household size was 3.02 and the average family size was 3.46.

23.9% of the population was under the age of 18, 8.6% from 18 to 24, 26.1% from 25 to 44, 28.4% from 45 to 64, and 13.0% who were 65 years of age or older. The median age was 39.0 years. For every 100 females, the population had 91.7 males. For every 100 females ages 18 and older there were 88.8 males.

The Census Bureau's 2006–2010 American Community Survey showed that (in 2010 inflation-adjusted dollars) median household income was $82,546 (with a margin of error of +/− $6,568) and the median family income was $99,963 (+/− $5,602). Males had a median income of $52,891 (+/− $2,058) versus $50,443 (+/− $2,598) for females. The per capita income for the borough was $35,034 (+/− $2,133). About 3.9% of families and 5.7% of the population were below the poverty line, including 7.2% of those under age 18 and 7.1% of those age 65 or over.

Same-sex couples headed 62 households in 2010, an increase from the 51 counted in 2000.

=== 2000 census ===
As of the 2000 United States census there were 26,247 people, 8,981 households, and 6,753 families residing in the borough. The population density was 9,065.4 inhabitants per square mile (3,500.2/km^{2}). There were 9,147 housing units at an average density of 3,159.3 per square mile (1,219.8/km^{2}). The racial makeup of the borough was 62.90% White, 6.90% African American, 0.24% Native American, 20.41% Asian (5,357 Asian), 0.02% Pacific Islander, 6.47% from other races, and 3.06% from two or more races. Hispanic or Latino residents of any race were 17.05% of the population.

There were 8,981 households, out of which 36.4% had children under the age of 18 living with them, 59.8% were married couples living together, 11.8% had a female householder with no husband present, and 24.8% were non-families. 20.8% of all households were made up of individuals, and 9.9% had someone living alone who was 65 years of age or older. The average household size was 2.92 and the average family size was 3.41.

In the borough 24.8% of the population was under the age of 18, 7.3% was from 18 to 24, 31.0% from 25 to 44, 23.2% from 45 to 64, and 13.5% was 65 years of age or older. The median age was 38 years. For every 100 females, there were 91.4 males. For every 100 females age 18 and over, there were 88.2 males.

The median income for a household in the borough was $62,172, and the median income for a family was $71,187. Males had a median income of $42,074 versus $35,137 for females. The per capita income for the borough was $24,706. About 2.6% of families and 3.5% of the population were below the poverty line, including 2.6% of those under age 18 and 3.8% of those age 65 or over.

== Economy ==
Prestige Records, a major producer of jazz recordings that was established in 1949, had its offices in Bergenfield from the mid-1960s until its sale in 1972.

== Arts and culture ==
The infamous group suicide of the "Bergenfield Four" took place in March 1987 and received worldwide attention. The victims were four local high schoolers, ages sixteen to nineteen, and their mutual deaths by carbon monoxide were followed by a rash of copycat attempts. The suicides are examined in sociological perspective in Donna Gaines' Teenage Wasteland (1998). References in the arts include the Tom Russell song "Bergenfield" (1989), and the Alice Donut song "New Jersey Exit" (1988).

The Royal Teens were a 1950s rock and roll band from the borough that was best known as one-hit wonders for their song "Short Shorts". The Knickerbockers were a 1960s band that took their name from Knickerbocker Road in nearby Tenafly. Mucky Pup was a hardcore and heavy metal band from Bergenfield.

Several scenes for the Harlem Globetrotter 1954 film Go, Man, Go! were filmed at Franklin School, and along nearby Prospect Avenue. Those scenes included actors Dane Clark (portraying Abe Saperstein) and Patricia Breslin (playing Sylvia Saperstein). Many of the school's 5th grade boys were used as extras.

On May 4, 2006, the ABC show Extreme Makeover: Home Edition came to Bergenfield to build a home for the Llanes family on New Bridge Road. The episode aired as the pre-season two-hour special originally broadcast on September 17, 2006. The Llanes sold their home in 2012 and went to live with relatives because their taxes increased beyond their ability to pay, having risen from under $6,500 in 2007 to more than $15,000 five years later due to the increased assessed value of the home following the renovation.

== Sports ==
On July 22, 2007, the Team Bergenfield Roller Hockey Club, won the NARCh National Roller Hockey Championship defeating the Nor-Cal Patriots 6–5 in Estero, Florida. Team Bergenfield went 6–0–1 in the tournament en route to winning the Men's Silver Championship. The team formed in Bergenfield in 1994 and is one of the longest running roller hockey clubs in the United States.

== Government ==
=== Local government ===
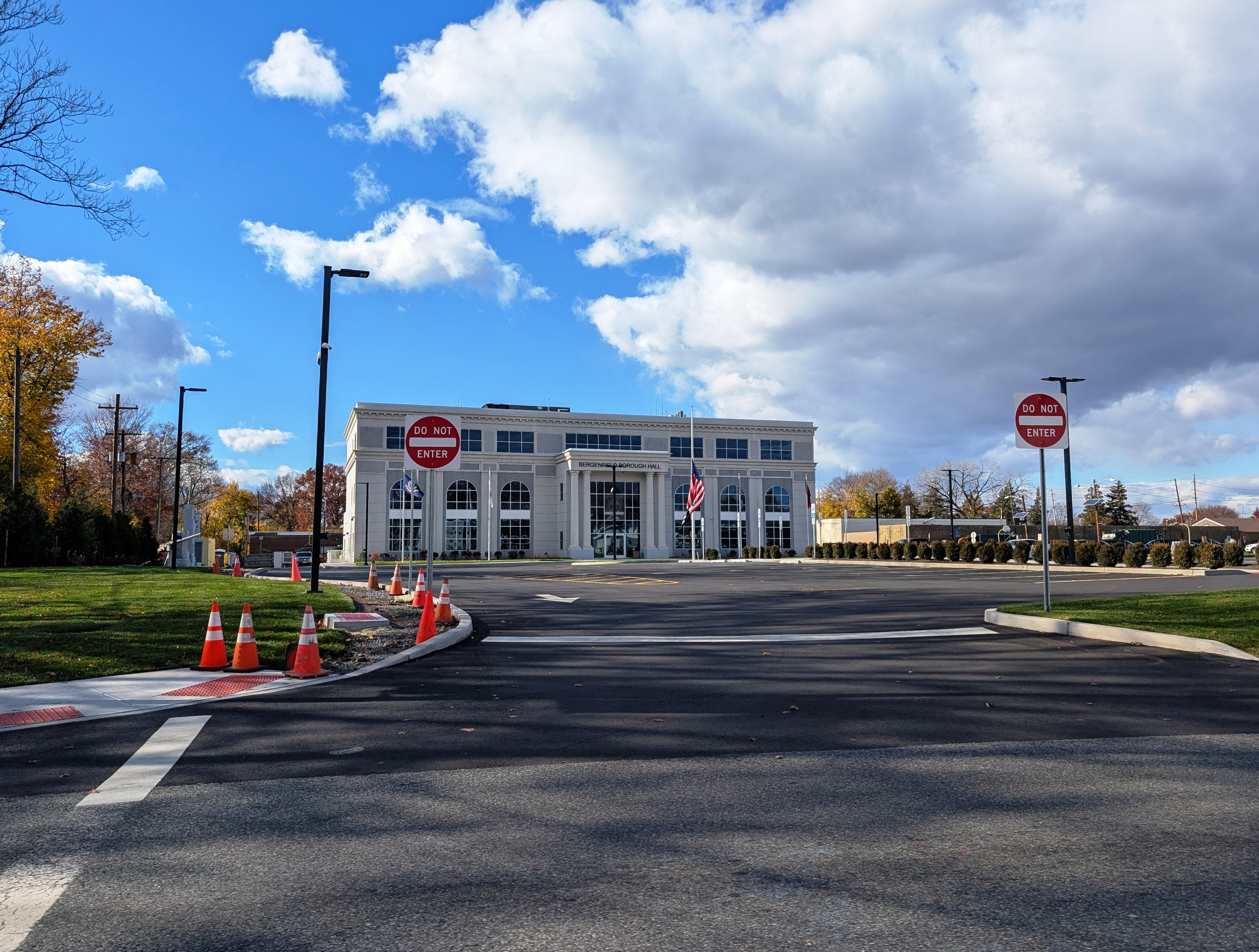
Bergenfield Borough Hall

Bergenfield is governed under the borough form of New Jersey municipal government, which is used in 218 municipalities (of the 564) statewide, making it the most common form of government in New Jersey. The governing body is comprised of a mayor and a borough council, with all positions elected at-large on a partisan basis as part of the November general election. A mayor is elected directly by the voters to a four-year term of office. The borough council includes six members elected to serve three-year terms on a staggered basis, with two seats coming up for election each year in a three-year cycle. The borough form of government used by Bergenfield is a "weak mayor / strong council" government in which council members act as the legislative body with the mayor presiding at meetings and voting only in the event of a tie. The mayor can veto ordinances subject to an override by a two-thirds majority vote of the council. The mayor makes committee and liaison assignments for council members, and most appointments are made by the mayor with the advice and consent of the council.

As of 2026, the mayor of Bergenfield is Democrat Arvin Amatorio, whose term of office ends December 31, 2027; a former borough council member, Amatorio unseated Republican Norman Schmelz in the 2019 election. Members of the Borough Council are Council President Domingo Almonte (D, 2026), Salvador S. "Buddy" Deauna (D, 2028), Ora Kornbluth (D, 2028), Thomas A. Lodato (D, 2027), Marc Pascual (D, 2026) and Hernando Rivera-Mejia (D, 2027).

In March 2023, the borough council appointed Domingo Almonte to fill the seat expiring in December 2023 that had been held been held by Rafael Marte.

In January 2020, the borough council selected Marc Pascual to fill the seat expiring in December 2020 that had been held by Arvin Amatorio until he stepped down to take office as mayor.

In January 2017, the borough council selected Rafael Marte to fill the seat expiring in December 2017 that had been held by Chris Tully until he resigned from office earlier that month.

=== Federal, state and county representation ===
Bergenfield is located in the 5th Congressional District and is part of New Jersey's 38th state legislative district.

For the 119th United States Congress, New Jersey's 5th congressional district is represented by Josh Gottheimer (D, Wyckoff). New Jersey is represented in the United States Senate by Democrats Cory Booker (Newark, term ends 2027) and Andy Kim (Moorestown, term ends 2031).

For the 2026–2027 session, the 38th legislative district of the New Jersey Legislature is represented in the State Senate by Joseph Lagana (D, Paramus) and in the General Assembly by Lisa Swain (D, Fair Lawn) and Chris Tully (D, Bergenfield).

Bergen County is governed by a directly elected County Executive, with legislative functions performed by a Board of County Commissioners comprised of seven members who are elected at-large to three-year terms in partisan elections on a staggered basis, with either two or three seats coming up for election each November; a Chairman and Vice Chairman are selected from among its seven members at a reorganization meeting held every January. As of 2025, the county executive is James J. Tedesco III (D, Paramus), whose four-year term of office ends December 31, 2026.

Bergen County's Commissioners are Chair Mary J. Amoroso (D, Mahwah, 2025), Vice Chair Steven A. Tanelli (D, North Arlington, 2027), Chair Pro Tem Joan Voss (D, Fort Lee, 2026), Rafael Marte (D, Bergenfield, 2026), Germaine M. Ortiz (D, Emerson, 2025), Thomas J. Sullivan Jr. (D, Montvale, 2025) and Tracy Silna Zur (D, Franklin Lakes, 2027).

Bergen County's elected constitutional officials are Clerk John S. Hogan (D, Northvale, 2026), Sheriff Anthony Cureton (D, Englewood, 2027) and Surrogate Michael R. Dressler (D, Cresskill, 2026).

=== Politics ===
Presidential election results

United States presidential election results for Bergenfield
Year	Republican		Democratic		Third party(ies)	
Year	No.	%	No.	%	No.	%
2024	5,504	44.04%	6,848	54.79%	146	1.17%
2020	4,745	34.42%	8,922	64.71%	120	0.87%
2016	3,745	32.51%	7,395	64.19%	380	3.30%
2012	3,149	32.74%	6,314	65.65%	155	1.61%
2008	4,561	41.13%	6,410	57.81%	118	1.06%
2004	4,657	44.43%	5,768	55.03%	57	0.54%
2000	3,534	36.77%	5,804	60.39%	273	2.84%
1996	3,348	33.69%	5,623	56.58%	968	9.74%
1992	4,499	40.61%	4,981	44.96%	1,599	14.43%
1988	6,256	55.59%	4,954	44.02%	44	0.39%
1984	7,863	63.66%	4,453	36.05%	36	0.29%
1980	6,759	83.49%	4.027	0.05%	1,333	16.46%
1976	7,006	56.31%	5,222	41.97%	213	1.71%
1972	9,136	68.34%	4,115	30.78%	118	0.88%
1968	7,310	56.04%	4,976	38.15%	758	5.81%
1964	5,363	40.52%	7,853	59.33%	21	0.16%
1960	8,160	61.19%	5,158	38.68%	18	0.13%

As of 2022, there were 18,848 registered voters in Bergenfield. As of 2011, there were a total of 14,083 registered voters in Bergenfield, of which 5,139 (36.5% vs. 31.7% countywide) were registered as Democrats, 2,151 (15.3% vs. 21.1%) were registered as Republicans and 6,782 (48.2% vs. 47.1%) were registered as Unaffiliated. There were 11 voters registered as Libertarians or Greens. Among the borough's 2010 Census population, 52.6% (vs. 57.1% in Bergen County) were registered to vote, including 69.2% of those ages 18 and over (vs. 73.7% countywide).

In the 2016 presidential election, Democrat Hillary Clinton received 7,395 votes (63.4% vs. 54.2% countywide), ahead of Republican Donald Trump with 3,745 votes (32.1% vs. 41.1% countywide) and other candidates with 305 votes (2.6% vs. 3.0% countywide), among the 11,653 ballots cast by the borough's 16,298 registered voters for a turnout of 71.5% (vs. 73% in Bergen County). In the 2012 presidential election, Democrat Barack Obama received 6,665 votes (62.7% vs. 54.8% countywide), ahead of Republican Mitt Romney with 3,773 votes (35.5% vs. 43.5%) and other candidates with 91 votes (0.9% vs. 0.9%), among the 10,624 ballots cast by the borough's 15,285 registered voters, for a turnout of 69.5% (vs. 70.4% in Bergen County). In the 2008 presidential election, Democrat Barack Obama received 6,410 votes (57.6% vs. 53.9% countywide), ahead of Republican John McCain with 4,561 votes (40.9% vs. 44.5%) and other candidates with 70 votes (0.6% vs. 0.8%), among the 11,138 ballots cast by the borough's 14,721 registered voters, for a turnout of 75.7% (vs. 76.8% in Bergen County).

Gubernatorial election results for Bergenfield
Year	Republican		Democratic		Third party(ies)	
Year	No.	%	No.	%	No.	%
2025	3,564	37.94%	5,799	61.73%	31	0.33%
2021	2,487	35.39%	4,504	64.10%	36	0.51%
2017	1,858	32.34%	3,822	66.53%	65	1.13%
2013	3,576	59.22%	2,416	40.01%	47	0.78%
2009	2,599	40.80%	3,463	54.36%	308	4.84%
2005	2,390	37.07%	3,915	60.72%	143	2.22%

In the 2017 gubernatorial election, Democrat Phil Murphy received 66.5% of the vote (3,822 cast), ahead of Republican Kim Guadagno with 32.3% (1,858 votes), and other candidates with 1.1% (65 votes), among the 5,891 ballots cast by the borough's 15,631 registered voters (146 ballots were spoiled), for a turnout of 37.7%. In the 2013 gubernatorial election, Republican Chris Christie received 59.2% of the vote (3,576 cast), ahead of Democrat Barbara Buono with 40.0% (2,416 votes), and other candidates with 0.8% (47 votes), among the 6,214 ballots cast by the borough's 14,629 registered voters (175 ballots were spoiled), for a turnout of 42.5%. In the 2009 gubernatorial election, Democrat Jon Corzine received 3,463 ballots cast (53.9% vs. 48.0% countywide), ahead of Republican Chris Christie with 2,599 votes (40.5% vs. 45.8%), Independent Chris Daggett with 276 votes (4.3% vs. 4.7%) and other candidates with 29 votes (0.5% vs. 0.5%), among the 6,420 ballots cast by the borough's 14,488 registered voters, yielding a 44.3% turnout (vs. 50.0% in the county).

United States Senate election results for Bergenfield1
Year	Republican		Democratic		Third party(ies)	
Year	No.	%	No.	%	No.	%
2024	4,744	39.61%	6,903	57.63%	331	2.76%
2018	2,809	33.52%	5,312	63.39%	259	3.09%
2012	3,149	32.77%	6,314	65.70%	147	1.53%
2006	2,876	43.25%	3,684	55.41%	89	1.34%

United States Senate election results for Bergenfield2
Year	Republican		Democratic		Third party(ies)	
Year	No.	%	No.	%	No.	%
2020	4,312	32.11%	8,865	66.02%	251	1.87%
2014	1,840	33.15%	3,642	65.61%	69	1.24%
2013	1,353	38.33%	2,146	60.79%	31	0.88%
2008	3,590	36.29%	6,178	62.45%	124	1.25%

== Emergency services ==
=== Police ===
The Bergenfield Police Department provides police services to the Borough of Bergenfield. As of 2010, there are a total of 46 sworn officers in the department, 8 civilian telecommunicators, and three civilian Records Bureau employees.

The force is responsible for all aspects of policing in the borough, including responding to fire and medical emergency calls. Each patrol car is equipped with a first aid kit, oxygen tank, and an Automated external defibrillator.

=== Fire ===
Started in 1905, the Bergenfield Fire Department (BFD) has three independent fire companies and a career staff.

=== Ambulance ===
The Bergenfield Volunteer Ambulance Corps, Inc. (BVAC) was formed in 1941 as the "Bergenfield Volunteer Firemen's Ambulance Corps." Renamed the "Bergenfield Volunteer Ambulance Corps, Inc." and established as an organization independent of the Bergenfield Fire Department in 1981, BVAC is located at 1 Froelich Street in Bergenfield. The BVAC is a volunteer independent public emergency medical service. As such, they do not bill for services. BVAC is funded by donations from the public as well as limited funding from the borough.

The corps provides basic life support, and is staffed by certified emergency medical technicians. BVAC has four ambulances, one first response SUV, and one EMS Support Unit. Dispatching is provided by the Bergenfield Police Department's 9-1-1 center.

The primary jurisdiction of the BVAC is the Borough of Bergenfield, but the corps also responds to requests for mutual-aid from the neighboring First Aid Squads of Dumont, New Milford, and Teaneck.

The BVAC is a member of the New Jersey State First Aid Council.

== Education ==
Students in pre-kindergarten through twelfth grade are educated by the Bergenfield Public Schools. As of the 2023–24 school year, the district, comprised of seven schools, had an enrollment of 3,710 students and 292.9 classroom teachers (on an FTE basis), for a student–teacher ratio of 12.7:1. Schools in the district (with 2023–24 enrollment data from the National Center for Education Statistics) are Franklin Elementary School with 372 students in grades PreK–5, Hoover Elementary School with 272 students in grades PreK–5, Jefferson Elementary School with 289 students in grades K–5, Lincoln Elementary School with 440 students in grades PreK–5, Washington Elementary School with 257 students in grades K–5, Roy W. Brown Middle School with 792 students in grades 6–8 and Bergenfield High School with 1,250 students in grades 9–12.

Public school students from the borough, and all of Bergen County, are eligible to attend the secondary education programs offered by the Bergen County Technical Schools, which include the Bergen County Academies in Hackensack, and the Bergen Tech campus in Teterboro or Paramus. The district offers programs on a shared-time or full-time basis, with admission based on a selective application process and tuition covered by the student's home school district.

== Transportation ==
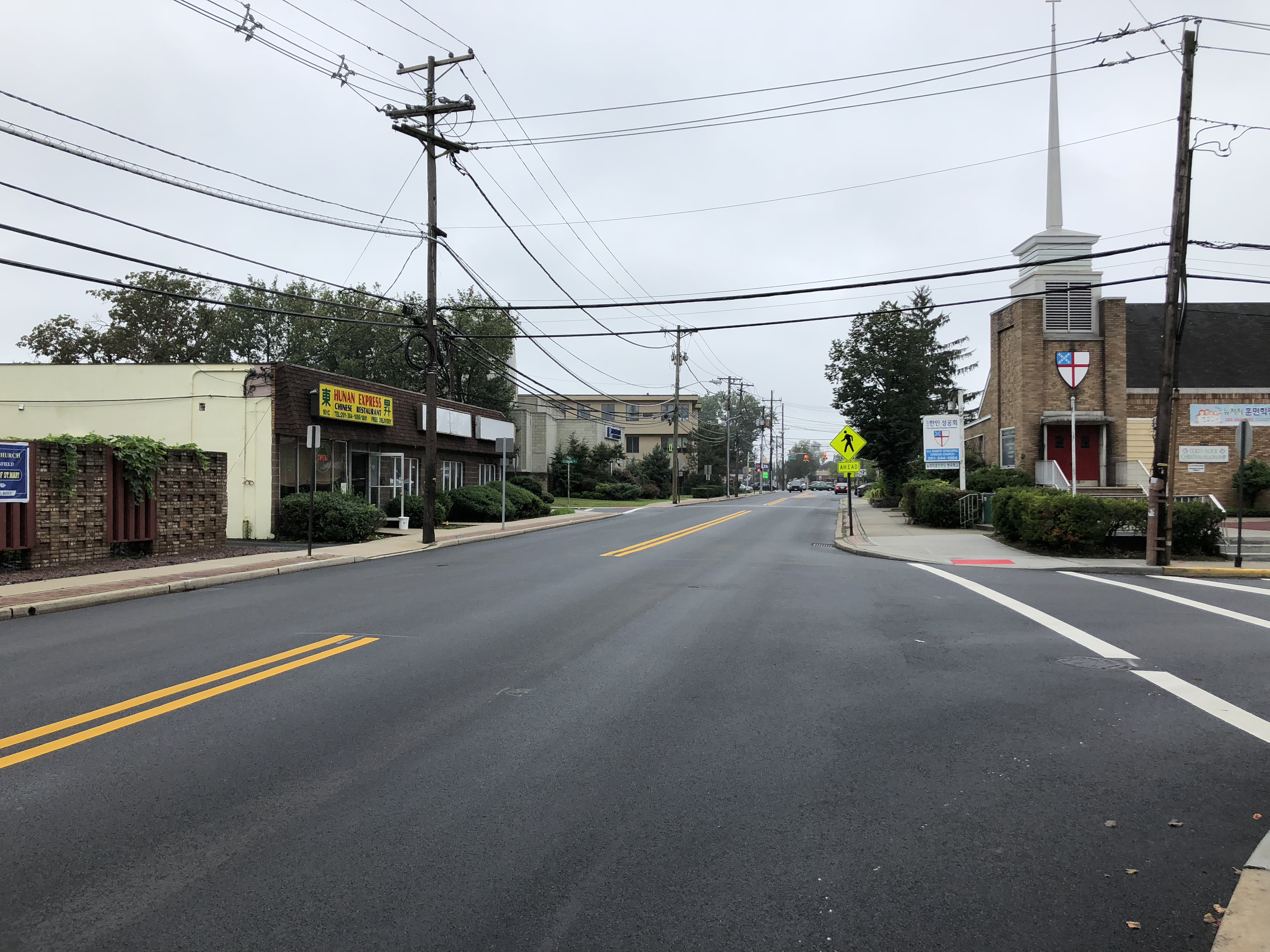
County Route 39 (Washington Avenue) in Bergenfield

=== Roads and highways ===
As of May 2010, the borough had a total of 60.50 miles (97.37 km) of roadways, of which 54.75 miles (88.11 km) were maintained by the municipality and 5.75 miles (9.25 km) by Bergen County.

Main roads include Washington Avenue, Main Street, Prospect Avenue, River Edge Road and New Bridge Road.

=== Public transportation ===
NJ Transit bus service is available to and from the Port Authority Bus Terminal in Midtown Manhattan on the 166, 167 routes and to the George Washington Bridge Bus Station on the 186 route; and to other New Jersey communities served on the 753, 756 and 772 routes.

Until 1959, the New York Central Railroad operated passenger service through the borough on the West Shore Railroad. Service operated north along the Hudson River to Albany, New York, and points west; and south to Weehawken Terminal.

== Community ==
Bergenfield is one of a growing number of districts to form a SID (Special Improvement District). Bergenfield's Special Improvement District stretches a mile along Washington Avenue from Teaneck to Dumont has been promoting the local businesses for several years. Its mission is to inform people about Bergenfield's shopping district and its over 50 international restaurants and food stores within one mile.

== Mayors ==
- Arvin Amatorio, 2020–present
- Norman Schmelz, 2014–2019.
- Carlos Aguasvivas, 2013
- Timothy J. Driscoll 2008 to 2013.
- Richard J. Bohan 2004-2007.
- Robert C. Rivas 1999 to 2003.
- Kevin M. Clancy 1996-1998
- Charles F. McDowell, Jr. 1992-1995
- Robert J. Gallione, Jr. 1988-1991
- Charles J. O'Dowd 1968-1971 and 1980-1987.
- James F. Lodato 1976-1979.
- William D. Armitage 1975
- H. Alfred Struhs 1974
- Walter S. Rosenbaum 1972-1973
- William J. Patterson 1964-1967
- Hugh M. Gillson 1960-1963
- Edward C. Meyer 1954 to 1959.
- Henry W. Theis 1946 to 1953.
- Leonard Lindstrom 1931.
- Charles A. Grabowski 1926.
- T. J. Prime 1918 to 1922.
- George Breisacher (1865–1934) 1912 to 1913.
- Walter Cornelius Christie (1863–1941) 1897 to 1891. He was the founder and the second mayor of Bergenfield, New Jersey.

== Notable people ==
People who were born in, residents of, or otherwise closely associated with Bergenfield include:

- Jack Antonoff (born 1984), singer, songwriter, and record producer, as well as guitarist of Fun
- Harry Basil, stand-up comic, actor in Peggy Sue Got Married and film director
- Chris Brantley (born 1970), former NFL wide receiver
- Walter Christie (1863–1941), founder of Bergenfield who was the borough's second mayor in 1897
- Pierce H. Deamer Jr. (1907–1986), politician who served in the New Jersey General Assembly and New Jersey Senate
- Al Di Meola (born 1954), jazz fusion and Latin jazz guitarist, composer and record producer
- Frank Eufemia (born 1959), Major League Baseball, pitcher
- Ella Fajardo (born 2003), point guard who plays for the Fairleigh Dickinson Knights women's basketball team and has represented the Philippine national team in international competitions
- Thom Fitzgerald (born 1968), filmmaker, The Hanging Garden, 3 Needles
- George Gately (1928–2001), creator of the Heathcliff comic strip
- Bob Gaudio (born 1942), from the Four Seasons
- Bob Guccione (1930-2010), founder and former owner of Penthouse
- Eugene Korn (born 1947), Orthodox rabbi who has focused on Jewish-Christian relations
- David Lat (born 1975), blogger
- Wayne Scot Lukas (born 1965), fashion consultant, who was co-host of the makeover reality television program What Not to Wear
- Jimmy Lydon (1923-2022), who played Henry Aldrich in the movies, honored in the Bergenfield Hall of Fame
- Kevin Marfo (born 1997), professional basketball player for Fortitudo Agrigento in Italy's Serie A2 league
- Produce Pete (born 1945), grocer, chef and celebrity spokesperson
- Tom Reilly (born 1959), actor who played Bobby Nelson on CHiPs
- Beatrice Schroeder Rose (1922–2014), author, composer, harpist and teacher, who was the principal harpist of the Houston Symphony for 31 years
- Rabbi Zvi Sobolofsky, Rosh Yeshiva at Yeshiva University
- Floyd James Thompson (1933–2002), America's longest held prisoner of war
- Donna Thorland, screenwriter and author of historical fiction.
- McCoy Tyner (1938–2020), jazz pianist known for his work with the John Coltrane Quartet and a long solo career
- Ron Villone (born 1970), Major League Baseball relief pitcher who played for 12 MLB teams, including for the New York Yankees in the 2006 season
- Jacklyn Zeman (1953-2023), actress who has played Barbara "Bobbie" Spencer on General Hospital since 1977

== Sources ==
- Municipal Incorporations of the State of New Jersey (according to Counties) prepared by the Division of Local Government, Department of the Treasury (New Jersey); December 1, 1958.
- Clayton, W. Woodford; and Nelson, William. History of Bergen and Passaic Counties, New Jersey, with Biographical Sketches of Many of its Pioneers and Prominent Men. Philadelphia: Everts and Peck, 1882.
- Harvey, Cornelius Burnham (ed.), Genealogical History of Hudson and Bergen Counties, New Jersey. New York: New Jersey Genealogical Publishing Co., 1900.
- Van Valen, James M. History of Bergen County, New Jersey. New York: New Jersey Publishing and Engraving Co., 1900.
- Westervelt, Frances A. (Frances Augusta), 1858–1942, History of Bergen County, New Jersey, 1630–1923, Lewis Historical Publishing Company, 1923.
