= Harry Basil =

American comedian

- Born: Bergenfield, New Jersey, U.S.
- Education: Bergenfield High School
- Occupations: Stand-up comedian, film director
- Employer: The Laugh Factory in Las Vegas
- Known for: Impressions of Arnold Schwarzenegger and Superman

Harry Basil is an American stand-up comedian, film director and comedy club operator, known for his impressions of Arnold Schwarzenegger and Superman. As an actor, Basil appeared in the film Peggy Sue Got Married. His film credits include Meet Wally Sparks, which he co-wrote with Rodney Dangerfield.

A native of Bergenfield, New Jersey, Basil attended Bergenfield High School, where he made a student film called Land Shark. As a high school student, Basil won a film award from the New Jersey Institute of Technology, as part of a presentation to him from director Otto Preminger.

In May 1984, Basil got his major break as a stand-up comedian as part of a show at The Comedy Store in Las Vegas, where he appeared as part of a group that included future comedy performers Louie Anderson, Jim Carrey, Andrew Dice Clay, and Paul Rodriguez making their first appearances on a stage in Las Vegas. Basil is a partner in the Laugh Factory comedy club located at Tropicana Hotel & Casino in Las Vegas.

As a film writer, Basil worked extensively with comedian Rodney Dangerfield, including such films as Meet Wally Sparks (1997), My 5 Wives (2000) The 4th Tenor (2002) and Back by Midnight (2005). Basil also directed the films Funky Monkey (2004), Cloud 9, Soul's Midnight (2006), Fingerprints (2006), and Urban Decay (2007).
