= Frank Eufemia =

American baseball player (born 1959)

Frank Anthony Eufemia
- Relief pitcher
- Born: December 23, 1959 (age 66); Bronx, New York
- Batted: Right Threw: Right

MLB debut
- May 21, 1985, for the Minnesota Twins

Last MLB appearance
- October 1, 1985, for the Minnesota Twins

MLB statistics
- Win–loss record: 4-2
- Earned run average: 3.79
- Strikeouts: 30
- Stats at Baseball Reference

Teams
- Minnesota Twins (1985)

Frank Anthony Eufemia (born December 23, 1959) is an American former Major League Baseball relief pitcher who played in 39 games for the Minnesota Twins in the 1985 season.

Eufemia grew up in Bergenfield, New Jersey and attended Bergenfield High School. He was drafted by the Twins in the 18th round of the 1982 MLB draft. His 1985 season was his only one in the majors; he returned to the minor leagues with the Toledo Mud Hens, the Twins’ Triple-A affiliate, for 1986 and was out of baseball the next season.

In 1992, Eufemia returned to organized baseball in the New York Mets’ minor league system, pitching for the Triple-A Tidewater Tides. He once again left baseball following the season and never pitched in affiliated baseball again, although in 1995, he was a replacement player in spring training for the New York Yankees during the ongoing strike.

Eufemia made one last comeback in 1998, where at the age of 38 he joined the New Jersey Jackals of the independent Northeast League for their inaugural season. Pitching exclusively as a starter for the only time in his baseball career, Eufemia started 11 games for the Jackals and went 5–1 for the eventual league champions.

After his playing career, Eufemia taught physical education and coached baseball and volleyball at Pascack Hills High School in Montvale, New Jersey, retiring in 2023. He had been the pitching coach at nearby Don Bosco High School before stepping down in 2009.
