= Bergenfield High School =

High school in Bergen County, New Jersey, US

Location
- 80 South Prospect Avenue; Bergenfield, Bergen County, New Jersey 07621; United States; 40.925371°N 74.005964°W

Information
- Type: Public high school
- Motto: “A Tradition of Excellence”
- Established: 1940
- School district: Bergenfield Public Schools
- CEEB code: 310090
- NCES School ID: 340150000268
- Principal: Robert Ragasa
- Faculty: 105.4 FTEs
- Grades: 9-12
- Enrollment: 1,239 (as of 2024–25)
- Student to teacher ratio: 11.8:1
- Hours in school day: 7 hours
- Colors: Red and Black
- Athletics conference: Big North Conference (general); North Jersey Super Football Conference (football)
- Team name: Bears
- Rivals: Dumont High School
- Accreditation: Middle States Association of Colleges and Schools
- Yearbook: Crossroads
- Website: bhs.bergenfield.org

Bergenfield High School is a four-year, comprehensive public high school serving students in ninth through twelfth grades from Bergenfield, in Bergen County, in the U.S. state of New Jersey, operating as part of the Bergenfield Public Schools. Bergenfield High School is accredited by the New Jersey Department of Education until July 2028 and has been accredited by the Middle States Association of Colleges and Schools since 1945.

As of the 2024–25 school year, the school had an enrollment of 1,239 students and 105.4 classroom teachers (on an FTE basis), for a student–teacher ratio of 11.8:1. There were 362 students (29.2% of enrollment) eligible for free lunch and 126 (10.2% of students) eligible for reduced-cost lunch.

The school's CEEB code is 310090.

== History ==
The original high school building was constructed at a cost of $370,000 (equivalent to $8.1 million in 2025) as an addition to an existing school, and dedicated in ceremonies held in April 1941. The current building was constructed at a cost of $3,625,000 (equivalent to $40.0 million in 2025) and opened in 1959 on South Prospect Avenue to accommodate the post war Baby Boom and replaced the combination junior/senior high school (formerly called Warren J. Harding) on the corner of Clinton and Washington Avenue, which become a middle school.

== Awards, recognition and rankings ==
The school was the 122nd-ranked public high school in New Jersey out of 339 schools statewide in New Jersey Monthly magazine's September 2014 cover story on the state's "Top Public High Schools," using a new ranking methodology. The school had been ranked 139th in the state of 328 schools in 2012, after being ranked 136th in 2010 out of 322 schools listed. The magazine ranked the school 234th in 2008 out of 316 schools and 192nd in the 2006. Schooldigger.com ranked the school tied for 163rd out of 381 public high schools statewide in its 2011 rankings (an increase of 52 positions from the 2010 ranking) which were based on the combined percentage of students classified as proficient or above proficient on the mathematics (80.5%) and language arts literacy (94.5%) components of the High School Proficiency Assessment (HSPA).

== Curriculum ==
Bergenfield High School offers a wide range of courses in the areas of art, business and marketing, English, health and physical education, industrial and technological education, mathematics, music, science, social studies, and world language. Class levels range from modified to Advanced Placement. Full- and half-year electives are also offered, and health classes are offered as a quarter-year elective within all gym classes.

Advanced Placement (AP) courses include AP Studio Art, AP Art History, AP English Language and Composition, AP English Literature and Composition, AP Calculus, AP Computer Science, AP Biology, AP Chemistry, AP Physics, AP United States History, AP United States Government and Politics, AP Music Theory, AP Psychology, AP Spanish Language, and AP European History.

Bergenfield High School offers medical-field based classes where the students have an opportunity to receive college credits from the University of Medicine and Dentistry of New Jersey (UMDNJ). Classes include Medical Terminology, Anatomy and Physiology, Dynamics of Healthcare, Emergency and Clinical Care.

== Extracurricular activities ==
The school is producing its own television station called Bears On Air that is available to all Cablevision customers. This channel will feature special events, such as college fairs and other events at BHS; InTune, a special program that will showcase the Bergenfield Music Department; Bears Den, a program showcasing rich athletic programs at Bergenfield; and In Reel Time, which will offer movie reviews. The channel is available for Cablevision customers on channel 77.

=== Music ===
- The NAMM Foundation (American Music Conference) has recognized Bergenfield High School as one of the Best Communities for Music Education in America for multiple years, including 2012 and was a finalist for the Grammy Signature Schools Award for multiple years as well.

Band performing for a movie in Manhattan

- The music department offers marching band, three concert bands, three orchestras, three choral ensembles, two jazz ensembles, and numerous chamber ensembles with weighted honors credits on Wind Ensemble, Chamber Orchestra, and Vocal Ensemble.
- Their three honor ensembles have performed at Avery Fisher Hall at Lincoln Center. The Honors Wind Ensemble received gold ratings at the state regional festival and was named a New Jersey Honor Band in 2007 and 2009.

==== Marching band ====
Bergenfield is well known for its now over 190-member marching band, whose uniforms loosely resemble those of the British Foot Guard Regiments. Bernard T. Baggs took direction in 1950, and the band has since worked with other notable names, such as Donald Angelica, Frank Levy, Bobby Thompson, Fred Sanford, Jack Meehan, and Dennis Delucia. The musicians currently work under the direction of Brian P. Timmons and the color guard under Michael DeLucia.

The band marched in the Super Bowl XLVIII Halftime Show and performed at the NFL Media Day festivities at the Prudential Center in Newark. Some of the many locations the band has performed includeDisney World, Yankee Stadium, New Meadowlands Stadium, Jets and Giants football games, Foxboro Stadium, Devils game at Prudential Center, United Nations, Broadway on Broadway, and the Annual North Jersey Marching Band Festival 65 times. The Record placed the band's image on the front cover of the November 2007 issue of its Sports Magazine.

Bergenfield hosts the annual USSBA Bergen County Invitational Band Festival, which has a roster of up to 16 bands per year. Although the band doesn't formally compete, they have received consistent gold and superior ratings at festivals such as the NJMEA State Marching Band Festival.

===== TV and film appearances =====
- The Bergenfield marching band represented New Jersey as the lead music group in a televised opening of the New Jersey pavilion at the 1964 New York World's Fair.
- They've marched at the Macy's Thanksgiving Day Parade for a record 20 times and were featured in a 1978 Macy's commercial. They've also participated in NYC ticker-tape parades.
- The band appeared on film in The Bounty Hunter and Tower Heist as the Macy's Great American Marching Band.
- Their notable TV news segments include News 12, Good Day New York when the Yankees won the 2009 World Series, and The Today Show where host Ann Curry fulfilled one of her long-time dreams by performing with the marching band.
- They performed live at the 41st Tony Awards held in June 1987 at the Mark Hellinger Theatre, appearing as part of a tribute aired to honor the then recently deceased Robert Preston, best known for his starring role in The Music Man.
- The band and color guard performed on Win, Lose, or Draw in 1988. The week of episodes that they filmed featured Gene Anthony Ray, Kim Fields, Susan Lucci, and Peter Marshall and were filmed on location in the Wollman Rink in New York City. The episodes originally aired the week of October 17-21, 1988.

=== Athletics ===
The Bergenfield High School Bears compete in the Big North Conference, which is comprised of public and private high schools in Bergen and Passaic counties, and was established following a reorganization of sports leagues in Northern New Jersey by the New Jersey State Interscholastic Athletic Association. Before the 2010 realignment, Bergenfield was one of the 12 schools participating in the North Bergen Interscholastic Athletic League (NBIL/NBIAL). With 847 students in grades 10-12, the school was classified by the NJSIAA for the 2019–20 school year as Group III for most athletic competition purposes, which included schools with an enrollment of 761 to 1,058 students in that grade range. The football team competes in the Patriot Red division of the North Jersey Super Football Conference, which includes 112 schools competing in 20 divisions, making it the nation's biggest football-only high school sports league. The school was classified by the NJSIAA as Group IV North for football for 2024–2026, which included schools with 893 to 1,315 students. Darren Massey is Bergenfield's athletic director.

The school participates with Dumont High School in a joint ice hockey team in which Fair Lawn High School is the host school / lead agency. The co-op program operates under agreements scheduled to expire at the end of the 2023–24 school year.

The school's wrestling program has been successful over the last 40 years. Former coach Sal Cascio is in the National Wrestling Hall of Fame and Museum in Stillwater, Oklahoma.

Most sports have Varsity, Junior Varsity, and Freshman teams, but some only have the top one or two tiers. Note: Sports marked with an asterisk (*) usually practice and compete with each other, but they are two separate teams and officially compete and are scored separately. Interscholastic sports offered by the school include:

- Fall sports teams: Cross Country (Boys')*, Cross Country (Girls')*, Football, Soccer (Boys'), Soccer (Girls'), Tennis (Girls'), Volleyball, & Cheerleading
- Winter sports teams: Basketball (Boys'), Basketball (Girls'), Bowling (Boys')*, Bowling (Girls')*, Track (Boys')*, Track (Girls')*, Wrestling, & Cheerleading
- Spring sports teams: Baseball, Softball, Golf (Boys')*, Golf (Girls')*, Tennis (Boys'), Track (Boys')* and Track (Girls')*

The boys basketball team won the Group I state championship in 1945 (defeating Hightstown High School in the tournament finals) and won the Group III state championship in 2015 (vs. Ewing High School). The 1945 team finished the season with a 22-2 record after winning the Group I title with a 53-40 win against Hightstown in the championship game played at the Elizabeth Armory. In 2015, the team won the North I Group III state sectional championship with a 71–69 win against Teaneck High School and went on to win the Group III state title with an 80–72 win in overtime against Ewing High School to earn their first state championship since 1945 and their first appearance to the Tournament of Champions in school history.

The football team won the North I Group IV state championship in 1974 and 1976, and won state titles in North I Group III in 1982, 1986 and 1987. The 1974 team finished the season with a 9-1 record after winning the first North I Group IV sectional title of the playoff era with a 36-0 victory against John F. Kennedy High School in front of 7,000 fans. The 1976 team defeated Bayonne High School in front of a crowd of 10,000 spectators at Giants Stadium by a score of 19-8 to win the North I Group IV sectional title. A 35-0 win against Vernon Township High School in the 1982 North I Group III sectional championship game gave the team an 11-0 final record. The 1986 team finished the season with a record of 11-0 after winning the North I Group III state sectional title with a 52-8 win against Hoboken High School in a game that was ended early due to a brawl between the two teams. With a 14-0 victory against Wayne Valley High School, the 1987 team won the program's second consecutive North I Group III state sectional title and finished the season with a 10-1 record.

The boys bowling team won the overall state championship in 1978.

The wrestling team won the North I Group III state sectional title in 1983.

== Administration ==
The school's principal is Robert Ragasa. His administration team includes the assistant principal.

== Notable alumni ==
- Harry Basil, stand-up comic, actor in Peggy Sue Got Married and film director
- Frank Eufemia (born 1959), former MLB relief pitcher who played for the Minnesota Twins
- Thom Fitzgerald (born 1968), filmmaker The Hanging Garden, The Event, 3 Needles
- Al Di Meola (born 1954), jazz fusion guitarist
- Bob Gaudio (born 1942), singer, songwriter and producer, of the group The Four Seasons
- Floyd James Thompson (1933–2002), America's longest-held prisoner of war
- Chris Tully (born 1982), politician who has represented the 38th Legislative District in the New Jersey General Assembly since 2018
- Ron Villone (born 1970), former major league pitcher, who played for 12 teams in his career
- Jacklyn Zeman (1953–2023), actress who played Barbara "Bobbie" Spencer on General Hospital from 1977 to 2023
