= Walter Christie (mayor) =

Politician in New Jersey, United States

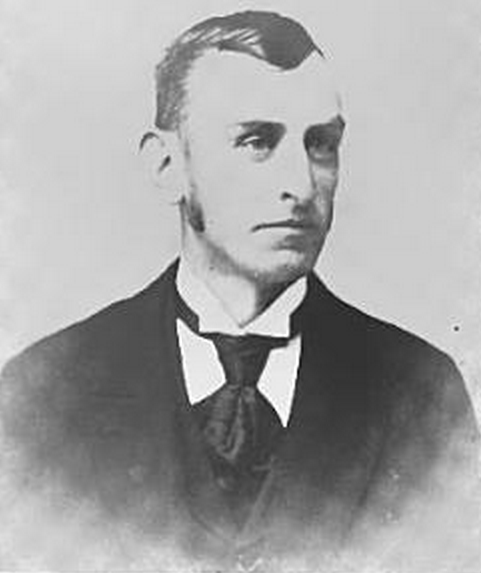
Christie circa 1900

Walter Cornelius Christie (November 16, 1863 – June 2, 1941) was an American local politician and the founder of Bergenfield, New Jersey, where he served as mayor in 1897. He was elected to the Board of Chosen Freeholders for Bergen County, New Jersey, in 1900. He was known as the "Town Father" of Bergenfield.

== Biography ==
He was born on November 16, 1863, to Ann and Cornelius Roelf Christie, in what was to become Bergenfield, New Jersey, near the South Schraalenburgh Church.

He married Maria Van Wagoner (1862-1951) on December 16, 1885. He served for eight consecutive years as the Collector of Taxes for Palisades, New Jersey, starting in 1886. The borough of Bergenfield was founded on June 25, 1894, from land that was formerly in Palisades, New Jersey that he had purchased together with William Outis Allison. He became the first councilman and the first school board president. He served as the second Mayor of Bergenfield, New Jersey, starting in 1897. On March 15, 1900, he was elected to the Board of Chosen Freeholders for Bergen County, New Jersey. In 1907 he established the free public library. In 1910 he founded the Bergenfield Building and Loan Association and in 1919 the National Bank and Trust Company. He was a director of the Palisades Trust company until he resigned in 1940, because of his position as Chairman of the Board of the Bergenfield National Bank.

He died on June 2, 1941, in Haworth, New Jersey, he was 77 years old. He was buried at the South Schraalenburgh Church cemetery.
