= Meet Wally Sparks =

1997 American comedy film

- Theatrical release poster
- Directed by: Peter Baldwin
- Written by: Harry Basil; Rodney Dangerfield
- Produced by: Leslie Greif
- Starring: Rodney Dangerfield; Debi Mazar; Cindy Williams; Alan Rachins; Burt Reynolds; David Ogden Stiers; Michael Weatherly
- Cinematography: Richard H. Kline
- Edited by: Raúl Dávalos
- Music by: Michel Colombier
- Production company: Largo Entertainment
- Distributed by: Trimark Pictures
- Release date: January 31, 1997
- Running time: 105 minutes
- Country: United States
- Language: English
- Budget: $12 million
- Box office: $4.1 million

Meet Wally Sparks is a 1997 American comedy film directed by Peter Baldwin, written by Harry Basil and Rodney Dangerfield. It stars Dangerfield in the title role, with Debi Mazar, Michael Weatherly, Cindy Williams, Alan Rachins, Burt Reynolds and David Ogden Stiers costarring.

== Plot ==
Wally Sparks is the host of a sleazy tabloid-style TV talk show who makes Jerry Springer seem gentle by comparison. His show has become so foul that he has alienated his not-especially discriminating viewers, and his ratings are taking a nosedive.

Lenny Spencer, head of the network carrying his show, gives Wally an ultimatum—he has a week to clean up the content and boost his ratings, or his show gets cancelled.

Wally's producer, Sandy Gallo, comes up with an idea—Floyd Preston is the governor of Georgia and a staunch conservative known for his attacks on the lowbrow content of Wally's show, so what better way to demonstrate that Wally is trying to change his ways than to have Preston on the show as a guest?

In order to persuade Preston to appear, Wally accepts an invitation to a reception at the Governor's Mansion, later learning that the Governor's young son is the fan who sent him the invitation. Wally makes the mistake of participating in a drunken game of strip poker with Preston's wife, Emily, while somehow involving himself in a plot to blackmail the Governor. Further complications ensue when Wally's son, Dean, begins a romantic relationship with the Governor's daughter.

== Cast ==
=== Main cast ===
- Rodney Dangerfield as Wally Sparks
- Debi Mazar as Sandy Gallo
- Cindy Williams as Emily Preston
- Alan Rachins as Judge Randal Williams
- Michael Weatherly as Dean Sparks
- Lisa Thornhill as Priscilla Preston
- Mark L. Taylor as Harvey Bishop
- Eamonn Roche as Alan Miller
- Lenny Clarke as Joey
- Cindy Ambuehl as Lola Larue
- Glenn Walker Harris, Jr. as Robby Preston
- Burt Reynolds as Mr. Lenny Spencer
- David Ogden Stiers as Governor Floyd Preston

=== Acting cameos ===
- Tony Danza as Taxi Driver
- Lesley-Anne Down as Hooker Nurse
- Karen Duffy as Reporter
- Gilbert Gottfried as Mr. Harry Karp
- Sandy Helberg as Commercial Director
- Carmen Filpi as Bum
- Ron Jeremy as Porn Actor
- ”Stuttering” John Melendez as a Reporter
- Sir Mix-a-Lot as Rapper Announcer
- Barry Nolan as Reporter
- Bob Saget as Reporter
- Julia Sweeney as Mrs. Martha Karp
- Dee Booher as Lady Party Guest
- George Wallace as The Bartender

=== Cameos as themselves ===
- Richard Bey
- Morton Downey, Jr.
- George Hamilton
- John Henson
- Jay Leno
- Sally Jessy Raphael
- Geraldo Rivera
- Jerry Springer
- Alana Stewart
- Rolonda Watts
- Tim Allen
- Michael Bolton
- Gabrielle Carteris
- Roseanne

== Release ==
=== Box office ===
Meet Wally Sparks opened in 1,552 venues on January 31, 1997, and ranked number 13 in the domestic box office in its opening weekend, earning $2,131,001. At the end of its run, the film grossed $4,073,582.

=== Critical reception ===
The film received largely negative reviews from critics. Review aggregator website Rotten Tomatoes reports that only 13% from 16 reviews gave the film a positive review. Audiences polled by CinemaScore gave the film an average grade of "C+" on an A+ to F scale.
