= The 4th Tenor =

2002 film

- VHS cover
- Directed by: Harry Basil
- Written by: Rodney Dangerfield; Harry Basil
- Produced by: Joseph Merhi
- Starring: Rodney Dangerfield
- Cinematography: Ken Blakey
- Edited by: Tony Lombardo
- Distributed by: Imageworks Entertainment; Metro-Goldwyn-Mayer
- Release date: November 22, 2002
- Running time: 97 minutes
- Country: United States
- Language: English

The 4th Tenor is a 2002 American comedy film directed by Harry Basil and written by and starring Rodney Dangerfield. It was Dangerfield's final film role during his lifetime before his death in October 2004.

== Premise ==
Lupo falls in love with an Italian woman who rejects him, insisting that she will only marry a great opera singer. Lupo travels to Italy in hopes of learning how to sing opera.

== Cast ==
- Rodney Dangerfield as Lupo
- Anita De Simone as Rosa
- Annabelle Gurwitch as Gina
- Charles Fleischer as Alphonse
- Robert Davi as Ierra
- Hamilton Camp as Papa
- Elsa Raven as Mama
- Jacob Urrutia as Mario
- Richard Libertini as Vincenzo
- Dom Irrera as Petey
- Patrick Cupo as Nunzio
- Anney Giobbe as Francesca
- Vincent Schiavelli as Marcello
- Pierrino Mascarino as Roberto
- Marty Belafsky as Johnny
- Don Stark as Tony
- Lisa Mende as Sonia

== Reception ==
"Dangerfield still gets no respect, but at eighty years of age, still manages to get a laugh or two in this low-budget comedy , playing an Italian restaurant owner with a tin ear", found DVD & Video Guide in 2005
