= Palisades Township, New Jersey =

Coordinates: 40.944°N 74.009°W

Palisades Township was a township that existed in Bergen County, New Jersey, United States. The township was in existence from 1871 to 1922.

On March 22, 1871, Hackensack Township was divided into three parts that were incorporated as townships by the New Jersey Legislature, each stretching from the Hudson River on the east to the Hackensack River in the west:

- The northernmost portion was Palisades Township;
- The center strip was Englewood Township; and,
- The southernmost portion became Ridgefield Township.

The new Township was quickly subdivided. The implementation by the New Jersey Legislature of a new Borough Act served to encourage the creation of new municipalities, most formed from portions of two (or more) Townships. Palisades Township survived for a half century after this new legislation, and the case of "Boroughitis" it fomented.

In 1894, five boroughs were created from within Palisades Township (and portions of other townships, as indicated): Tenafly (January 24, 1894), Delford (March 8, 1894, now Oradell; also included portions of Harrington Township), Cresskill (May 11, 1894), Bergenfield (June 26, 1894, also created from portions of Englewood Township) and Schraalenburgh (July 20, 1894, changed name to Dumont in 1928; also included portions of Harrington Township). On May 10, 1895, Englewood Cliffs was created from sections of both Englewood Township and Palisades Township. Demarest was formed on April 8, 1903, from portions of both Palisades and Harrington Townships.

On March 7, 1898, portions of the Borough of Schraalenburgh were annexed to the township.

On March 11, 1922, New Milford was formed from the remaining portions of Palisades Township. With the creation of the Borough of New Milford, Palisades Township was dissolved.

== Notable people ==
People who were born in, residents of, or otherwise closely associated with Palisade Township include:

- Robert Elliott Burns (1892–1955), World War I veteran whose memoir, I Am a Fugitive from a Georgia Chain Gang!, exposed the cruelty and injustice of the chain gang system.

== Sources ==
- Municipal Incorporations of the State of New Jersey (according to Counties) prepared by the Division of Local Government, Department of the Treasury (New Jersey); December 1, 1958.
- Clayton, W. Woodford; and Nelson, William. History of Bergen and Passaic Counties, New Jersey, with Biographical Sketches of Many of its Pioneers and Prominent Men., Philadelphia: Everts and Peck, 1882.
- Harvey, Cornelius Burnham (ed.), Genealogical History of Hudson and Bergen Counties, New Jersey. New York: New Jersey Genealogical Publishing Co., 1900.
- Van Valen, James M. History of Bergen County, New Jersey. New York: New Jersey Publishing and Engraving Co., 1900.
- Westervelt, Frances A. (Frances Augusta), 1858–1942, History of Bergen County, New Jersey, 1630-1923, Lewis Historical Publishing Company, 1923.
