= Bergenfield Public School District =

School district in Bergen County, New Jersey, US

Address
- 100 South Prospect Avenue Bergenfield, Bergen County, New Jersey, 07621; United States
- Coordinates: 40.92469°N 74.006235°W

District information
- Grades: K-12
- Superintendent: Christopher Tully
- Business administrator: JoAnn Khoury-Frias
- Schools: 7

Students and staff
- Enrollment: 3,710 (as of 2023–24)
- Faculty: 292.9 FTEs
- Student–teacher ratio: 12.7:1

Other information
- District Factor Group: FG
- Website: www.bergenfield.org
Ind.	Per pupil	District spending	Rank (*)	K-12 average	%± vs. average
1A	Total Spending	$17,937	43	$18,891	−5.1%
1	Budgetary Cost	15,264	64	14,783	3.3%
2	Classroom Instruction	9,215	73	8,763	5.2%
6	Support Services	2,052	37	2,392	−14.2%
8	Administrative Cost	1,762	93	1,485	18.7%
10	Operations & Maintenance	1,871	73	1,783	4.9%
13	Extracurricular Activities	261	58	268	−2.6%
16	Median Teacher Salary	65,110	52	64,043
Data from NJDoE 2014 Taxpayers' Guide to Education Spending. *Of K-12 districts with more than 3,500 students. Lowest spending=1; Highest=103

The Bergenfield Public School District is a comprehensive community public school district that serves students in pre-kindergarten through twelfth grade from Bergenfield in Bergen County, in the U.S. state of New Jersey.

As of the 2023–24 school year, the district, comprising seven schools, had an enrollment of 3,710 students and 292.9 classroom teachers (on an FTE basis), for a student–teacher ratio of 12.7:1.

The district participates in the Interdistrict Public School Choice Program, which allows non-resident students to attend school in the district at no cost to their parents, with tuition covered by the resident district. Available slots are announced annually by grade.

== History ==
In 1935, the district's board of education cited overcrowding at Dumont High School and Tenafly High School, which Bergenfield students had been attending, as justification to build a new high school, as long as costs were reasonable and government funding was obtained. The original high school building was constructed at a cost of $370,000 (equivalent to $7.9 million in 2024) as an addition to an existing school, and dedicated in ceremonies held in April 1941. The latest high school building was constructed at a cost of $3,625,000 (equivalent to $39.1 million in 2024) and opened in 1959 on South Prospect Avenue to accommodate the post war Baby Boom and replaced the combination junior/senior high school (formerly called Warren J. Harding) on the corner of Clinton and Washington Avenue, which become a middle school.

The district had been classified by the New Jersey Department of Education as being in District Factor Group "FG", the fourth-highest of eight groupings. District Factor Groups organize districts statewide to allow comparison by common socioeconomic characteristics of the local districts. From lowest socioeconomic status to highest, the categories are A, B, CD, DE, FG, GH, I and J.

== Schools ==
Schools in the district (with 2023–24 enrollment data from the National Center for Education Statistics) are:

Elementary schools

- Franklin Elementary School with 372 students in grades PreK–5
  - Everett B. Thompson, principal
- Hoover Elementary School with 272 students in grades PreK–5
  - William Fleming, principal
- Jefferson Elementary School with 289 students in grades K–5
  - Craig Vogt, principal
- Lincoln Elementary School with 440 students in grades PreK–5
  - James Mitchel, principal
- Washington Elementary School with 257 students in grades K–5
  - Thomas Lawrence, principal

Middle school

- Roy W. Brown Middle School with 792 students in grades 6–8
  - Dominick Rotante, principal

High school

- Bergenfield High School with 1,250 students in grades 9–12
  - Robert Ragasa, principal

== Administration ==
Core members of the district's administration are:

- Christopher Tully, superintendent of schools
- JoAnn Khoury-Frias, business administrator and board secretary

== Board of education ==
The district's board of education is comprised of five members who set policy and oversee the fiscal and educational operation of the district through its administration. As a Type II school district, the board's trustees are elected directly by voters to serve three-year terms of office on a staggered basis, with either one or two seats up for election each year held (since 2012) as part of the November general election. The board appoints a superintendent to oversee the district's day-to-day operations and a business administrator to supervise the business functions of the district.
