= Donna Gaines =

American journalist, social worker, and sociologist

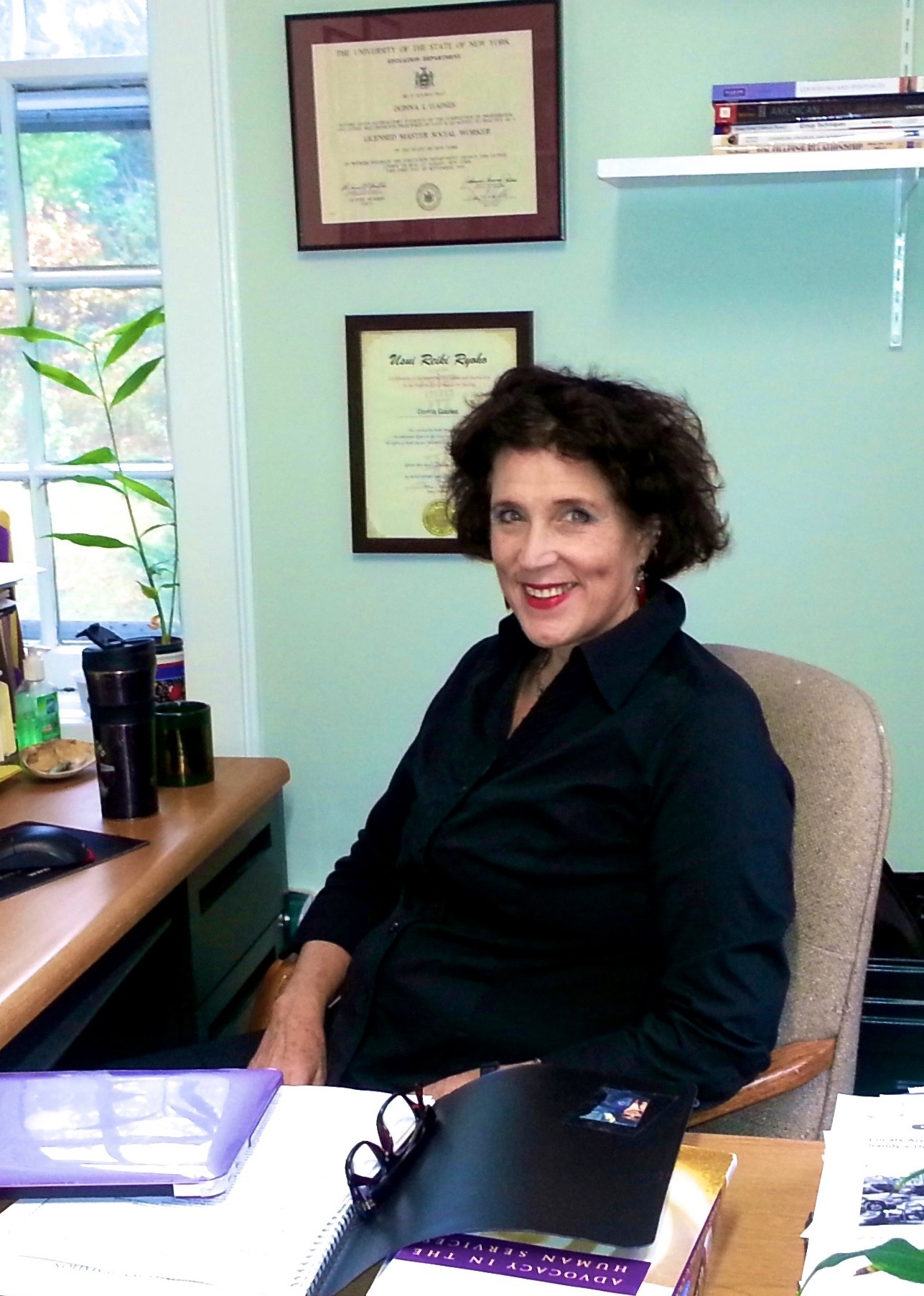
- Occupations: sociologist; journalist; social worker

Donna Gaines is a sociologist, journalist, and social worker in the United States.

Gaines is best known for her work on youth suicide and popular culture. Gaines has written features for Rolling Stone, MS, the Village Voice, Spin, Newsday and Salon. Gaines is the author of Teenage Wasteland: Suburbia's Dead End Kids (University of Chicago Press 1997), A Misfit's Manifesto: The Sociological Memoir of a Rock & Roll Heart (Rutgers University Press 2007), and Why The Ramones Matter (ForeEdge/UPNE 2018).
