= South Schraalenburgh Church =

Historic church in New Jersey, United States

- U.S. National Register of Historic Places
- New Jersey Register of Historic Places
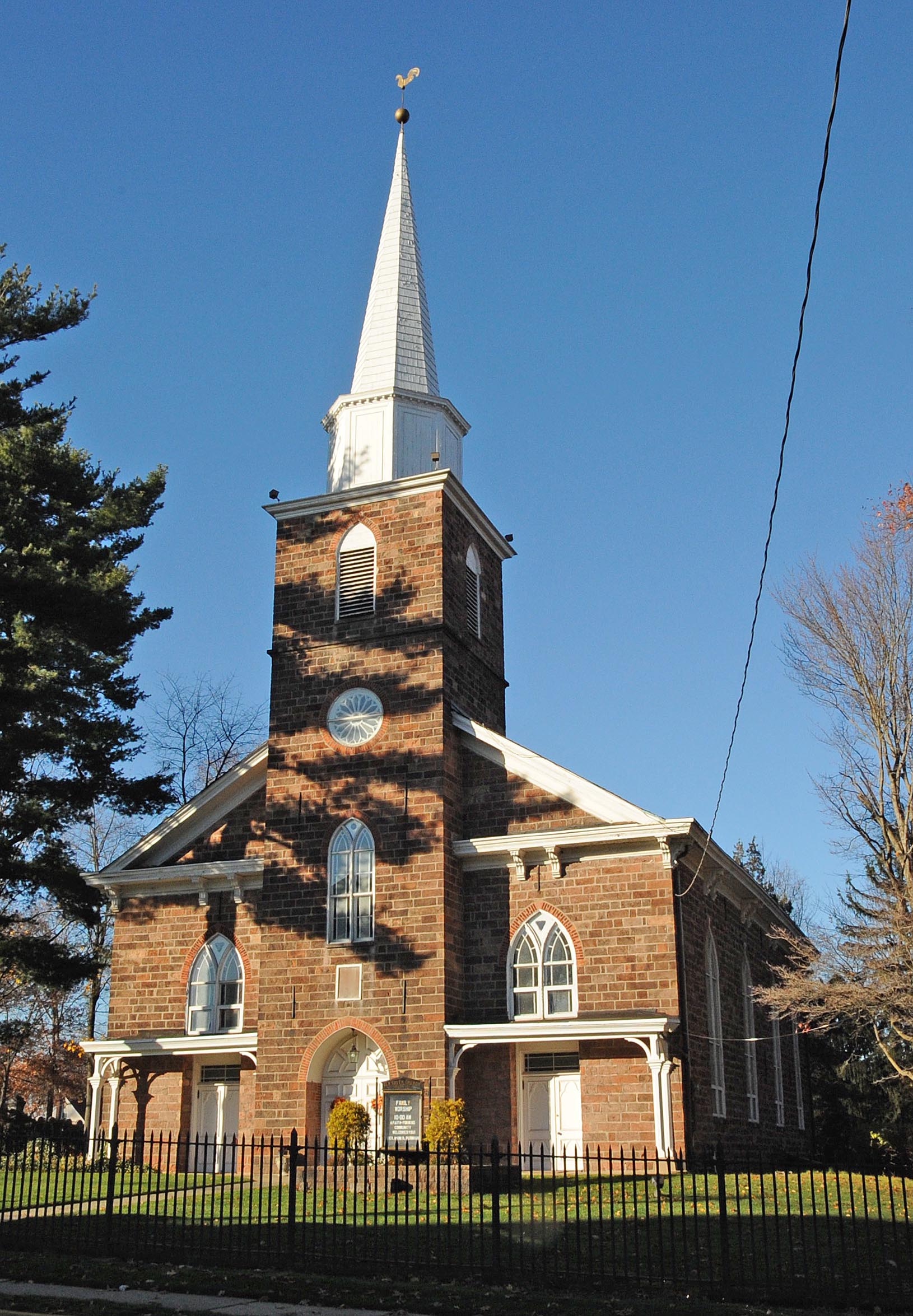
- South Schraalenburgh Church in 2015

- Location within Bergen County, New Jersey Location within New Jersey Location within the United States
- Location: Prospect Avenue and West Church Street, Bergenfield, New Jersey
- Coordinates: 40°55′46″N 74°0′12″W
- Area: 5.8 acres (2.3 ha)
- Built: 1799
- Architects: Westervelt, Aaron I.
- NRHP reference No.: 75001116
- NJRHP No.: 435

Significant dates
- Added to NRHP: December 6, 1975
- Designated NJRHP: September 26, 1975

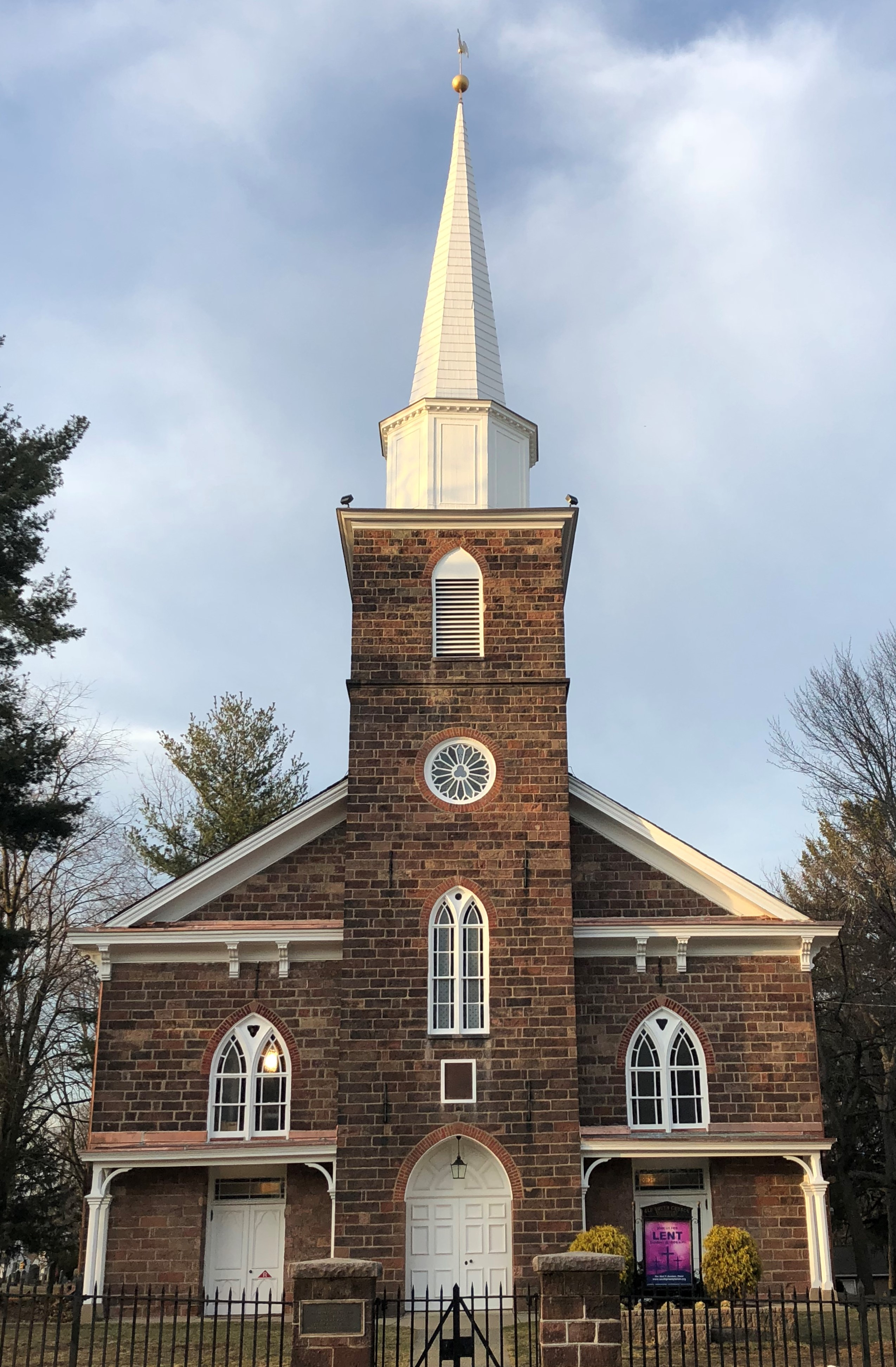
South Presbyterian Church sanctuary (1799), 2/2018

South Schraalenburgh Church, also known as South Presbyterian Church, was founded 1723 in Bergenfield, Bergen County, New Jersey, United States, as a Dutch Reformed church, as an alternative place of worship, as the nearest church was located in Hackensack. The square sanctuary was completed in 1728, with a new sanctuary (still currently in use) completed in 1799. Opposing elements within the congregation split with the mainstream and founded the North Schraalenburgh Reformed Church in 1801.

In 1913 the church joined the Presbyterian Church, and changed their name to the South Presbyterian Church.

External videos
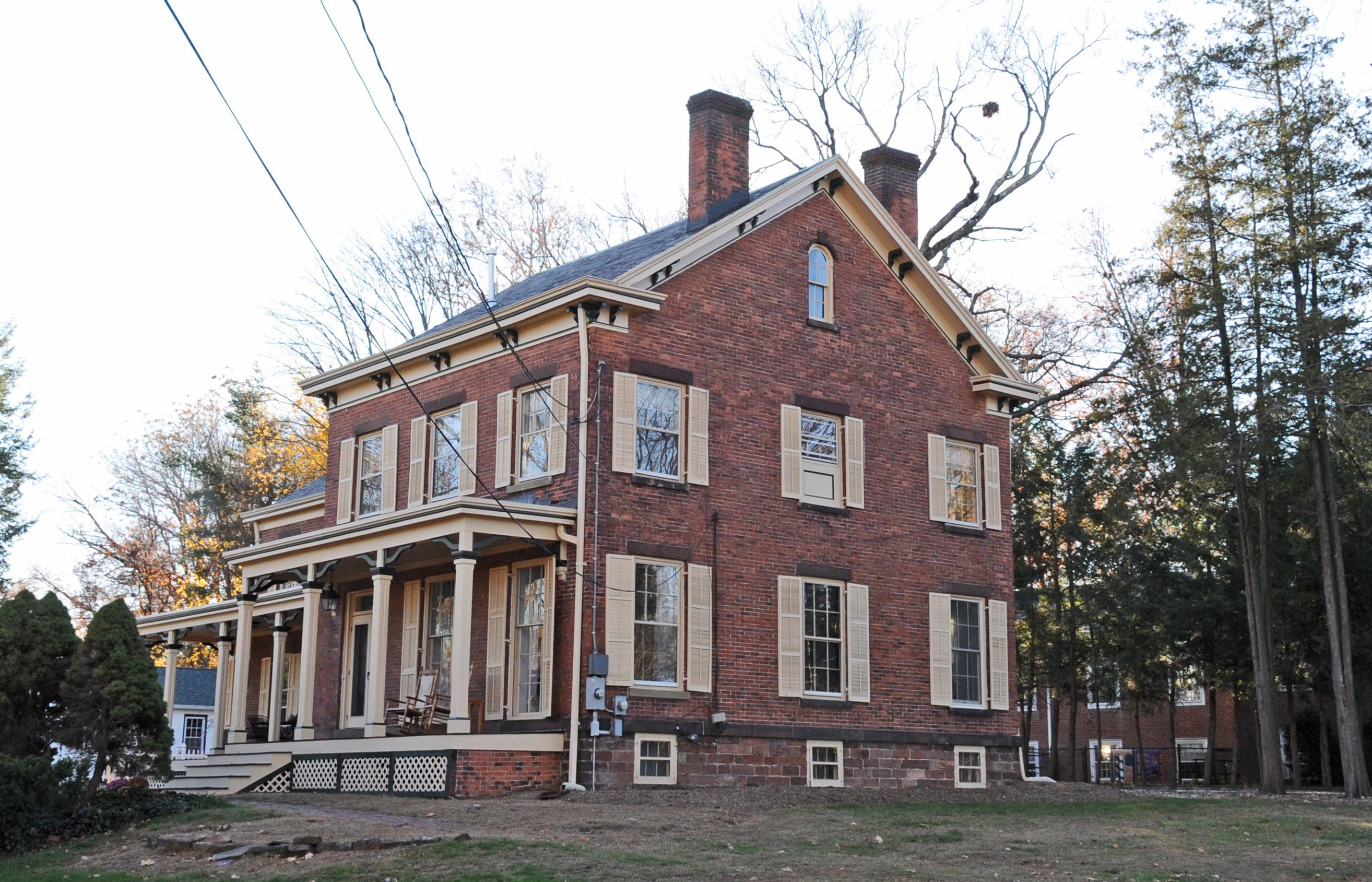
- South Church Manse
- Our History

== See also ==
- National Register of Historic Places listings in Bergen County, New Jersey
- South Church Manse
