= Schraalenburgh North Church =

Historic church in New Jersey, United States

- North Church
- U.S. National Register of Historic Places
- New Jersey Register of Historic Places
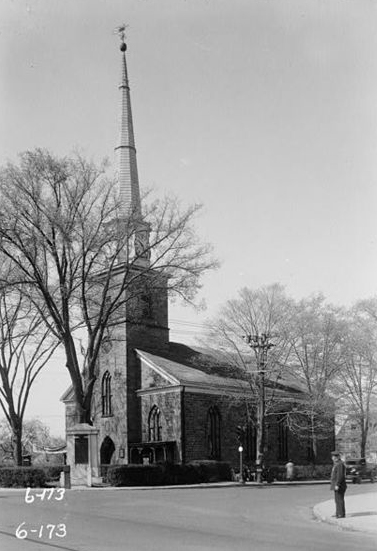
- Schraalenburgh North Church

- Location within Bergen County, New Jersey Location within New Jersey Location within the United States
- Location: 120 Washington Avenue and 191 Washington Avenue, Dumont, New Jersey
- Coordinates: 40°56′24″N 73°59′43″W
- Area: 7.1 acres (2.9 ha)
- Built: 1801
- Architects: Durie, Peter J.
- Architectural style: Wrenn-Gibbs type
- NRHP reference No.: 83001538
- NJRHP No.: 460

Significant dates
- Added to NRHP: May 26, 1983
- Designated NJRHP: April 8, 1983

Schraalenburgh North Church, also known as North Church and as The Old North Reformed Church or Old Reformed Church, was founded in 1801 as a Dutch Reformed Church, in present-day Dumont, Bergen County, New Jersey, United States. The congregation was made up of those who originally were members of the South Schraalenburgh Church.

The cemetery contains burials of parishioners up to 1911, and a list of interments has been transcribed on the Internet by Bob Winship. As "North Church", the church was added to the National Register of Historic Places on May 26, 1983.

== See also ==
- National Register of Historic Places listings in Bergen County, New Jersey
