= Tenth (administrative division) =

Geographic division used in the former American Province of West Jersey

- Category: County division
- Location: West New Jersey
- Found in: Counties
- Created: Various, see text
- Abolished: Various, see text
- Possible status: Defunct
- Areas: Up to 64,000 acres
- Government: Constables; Road Overseers; Surveyors of the Highways; Assessors; Tax Collectors
- Subdivisions: Precincts; Townships; Constableries

A tenth was used to divide the former American Province of West Jersey into smaller administrative divisions. Despite seemingly related names, tenths are not directly related to hundreds, other than both being administrative divisions.

== History ==
West Jersey was first divided into ten shares when Edward Byllynge and John Fenwick sold parts of their shares to others in order to defray debts. Byllynge, William Penn, Gawen Lawrie and Nicholas Lucas retained nine tenths of the province, with Fenwick retaining one tenth. Fenwick's tenth would eventually evolve into Salem County.

Tenths were formally established by the Lords Proprietors of West New Jersey under "The Concessions and Agreements of the Proprietors, Freeholders and Inhabitants of the Province of West New Jersey, in America", approved March 3, 1676/77, which provided for "dividing all the lands of the said Province, as be already taken up, or by themselves shall be taken up and contracted for with the natives; and the said lands so taken up and contracted for, to divide into one hundred parts, as occasion shall require; that is to say, for every quantity of land that they shall from time to time lay out to be planted and settled upon, they shall first for expedition divide the same into ten equal parts or shares".

In February 1681 "The Methods of the Commissioners for settling and regulation of Lands" directed that each tenth was to contain 64,000 acres, and to "have their proportion of front to the river Delaware". Only five of the tenths were actually organized.

== Government ==
=== County jurisdiction ===
Courts were established in 1681 at Salem and Burlington; the former to have jurisdiction over the Salem Tenth and the latter over the remaining nine tenths. A court was established at Gloucester in 1686 and had jurisdiction within the Third and Fourth Tenths. Three counties would appear to have been formalized before 1692 when the fourth, Cape May, was incorporated.

=== Legislative constituencies ===
The Concessions and Agreements provided for the election of a General Free Assembly; each tenth was a multi-member constituency electing a potential of ten members, although in practice this was limited to the settled and organized tenths. This was further codified by legislation approved in May 1682. This apportionment would remain, in modified form, after the establishment of counties and up until the surrender of the proprietary charter in 1702.

=== Local government ===
Tenths also functioned as units of local government. Chapter 44 of the Concessions and Agreements authorized the Assembly, " to sub-divide the said province into hundreds, proprieties, or such other divisions and distinctions, as they shall think fit". As early as 1682, constables were designated for the First, Second and Third Tenths. The following year, road maintenance was assigned to the tenths; the legislation directing "that the courts shall and may appoint such and so many overseers within their respective liberties, to repair and amend, and maintain the said highways, as they shall judge needful". The authority to lay out highways was enumerated in 1684, with commissioners appointed for the First, Second, Third and Salem tenths. Legislation enacted at the same session required the tenths to raise taxes for making and repairing bridges and highways, as well as for a number of expenses of the Province. For this purpose, each tenth was to nominate six assessors and two tax collectors.

== Abandonment ==
The system of tenths was gradually abandoned in favor of townships.

Salem Tenth, which had from the beginning taken a more independent approach than the others, was subdivided into five townships or precincts as early as the mid-1670s, namely, East Fenwick, Elsinburgh, Monmouth, West Fenwick and the town of Salem.

Burlington County, encompassing the First and Second Tenths, established eight "constablries" in 1688, being Chester or Cropwell, Chesterfield, Eversham, Mansfield, Northampton, Nottingham, Springfield, and Wellingborrow. The Town of Burlington had been authorized in 1677 under the Concessions and Agreements.

Gloucester County, which encompassed the Third and Fourth Tenths, in 1695 established the townships of Deptford, Gloucester, Greenwich, Newton and Waterford. These joined Gloucestertown, which had been formed by the Burlington Court in 1685.

== List of Tenths in West New Jersey ==
- First Tenth or Yorkshire Tenth was settled by Quakers from Yorkshire about 1676 and initially included land along the Delaware River between Assunpink Creek and Rancocas Creek. It was divided into Chesterfield, Mansfield and Nottingham townships, and part of Burlington Township.
- Second Tenth or London Tenth was settled by Quakers from southern England, also about 1676 and included land between Rancocas and Pennsauken Creeks. Settlers in the First and Second tenths chose the site of Burlington as a mutual settlement and redrew the boundary between the two tenths to follow High Street, thence the present southerly boundary of Springfield Township. The Second Tenth became the townships of Chester, Eversham, Northampton and Wellingborrow, and part of Burlington Township.
- Third Tenth or Irish Tenth, lying along the Delaware between Pennsauken and Big Timber Creeks, was settled in 1682 by William Bates and other Quakers from Ireland. It would later be divided into Waterford, Newton, Gloucester and Gloucestertown townships.
- Fourth Tenth, between Big Timber and Oldmans Creeks, contained some Swedish settlements, but did not participate in the government of West Jersey until 1685. It was partitioned into Deptford and Greenwich townships.
- Salem Tenth consisted of land between Oldmans and Back Creeks. Settled in 1675, it became the nucleus of Salem County.
- Six Lower Tenths referred to the sparsely settled Fourth and Sixth through Tenth Tenths. After the organization of the Fourth Tenth, the term Other 5 Tenths below referred to the Sixth through Tenth Tenths, which were never organized as separate entities and never delineated by individual boundaries. The only recorded activity within this territory was the November 25, 1685 appointment of Caleb Carman as justice of the peace in Cape May.

== See also ==
- Hundred (administrative division)
- Riding (division)
- Tithing
- Newton Colony, New Jersey
