= List of U.S. county name etymologies (S–Z) =

This is a list of U.S. county name etymologies, covering the letters S to Z.

== S ==
County name	State	Origin
Sabine County	Texas	Named for the Sabine River (from Spanish sabina, "cypress")
Sabine Parish	Louisiana	Named for the Sabine River (from Spanish sabina, "cypress")
Sac County	Iowa	Named for the Sauk (Sac) people
Sacramento County	California	Named for the city of Sacramento, California, itself named after the sacrament of the Eucharist
Sagadahoc County	Maine	From an Abenaki word meaning "mouth of the big river;" referring to the Kennebec River.
Saginaw County	Michigan	Uncertain; probably from Ojibwe words meaning "place of the outlet": sag (opening) + ong (place of).
Saguache County	Colorado	From a Ute word, "Sa-gua-gua-chi-pa", which roughly translated to "Blue Earth" and referred to clear blue waters from springs in the county.
City of Salem	Virginia	Named for Salem, New Jersey, in honor of William Bryan, who had moved from there.
Salem County	New Jersey	From Salem, a town mentioned in the Old Testament, from Hebrew shalom, "peace"; also from Salem Tenth, an early division of colonial West Jersey.
Saline County	Arkansas	Named for the salt water (brine) springs in the area.
Saline County	Illinois	Named for the Saline River (a tributary of the Ohio River).
Saline County	Kansas	Named for the Saline River (a tributary of the Smoky Hill River).
Saline County	Missouri	Named for the salt water (brine) springs in the area.
Saline County	Nebraska	Named for a belief held by the early pioneers that great salt springs and deposits could be found in the area, a hope found to be false.
Salt Lake County	Utah	Named for the Great Salt Lake.
Saluda County	South Carolina	Named for the Saluda River, named for a Native American tribe that lived along it (also Seleuda, Salutah).
Sampson County	North Carolina	Named for John Sampson, politician.
San Augustine County	Texas	Named for the town of San Augustine, Texas, named for the Presidio de San Agustín de Ahumada, named for Agustín de Ahumada, 2nd Marquess of Amarillas.
San Benito County	California	Named for the San Benito River, named in turn for Saint Benedict of Nursia.
San Bernardino County	California	Named for the San Bernardino Valley, named for San Bernardino de Sena Estancia, named in turn for Bernardino of Siena.
San Diego County	California	Named for Saint Didacus of Alcalá.
City and County of San Francisco	California	From Mission San Francisco de Asís, a Spanish mission located in what is now the city's Mission District and named for Francis of Assisi.
San Jacinto County	Texas	Named for the Battle of San Jacinto, which took place near the San Jacinto River, named for Saint Hyacinth of Caesarea.
San Joaquin County	California	Named for the San Joaquin River, named for Joachim, father of Mary, mother of Jesus.
San Juan County	Colorado	Named for the San Juan River, named for John the Baptist.
San Juan County	New Mexico	Named for the San Juan River, named for John the Baptist.
San Juan County	Utah	Named for the San Juan River, named for John the Baptist.
San Juan County	Washington	Named for the San Juan Islands.
San Luis Obispo County	California	Named for the Mission San Luis Obispo de Tolosa ("Mission of Saint Louis, Bishop of Toulouse"), named in turn for Louis of Toulouse.
San Mateo County	California	Named for Saint Matthew.
San Miguel County	Colorado	Named for the San Miguel River, which runs through the county.
San Miguel County	New Mexico	Named for the church at San Miguel del Vado, Spanish for "Saint Michael of the ford."
San Patricio County	Texas	Named for Saint Patrick; the original settlers were Irish Catholics.
San Saba County	Texas	Named for the San Saba River, which was named for Saint Sabbas the Sanctified.
Sanborn County	South Dakota	Named for George W. Sanborn, president of the Milwaukee Railroad.
Sanders County	Montana	Named for Wilbur Fiske Sanders, pioneer and U.S. Senator.
Sandoval County	New Mexico	Named for the Sandoval family, 17th-century landowners.
Sandusky County	Ohio	Named for the Sandusky River, from Wyandot saandusti, "water (within water-pools)"; or andusti, "cold water".
Sangamon County	Illinois	Named for the Sangamon River, from Pottawatomie Sain-guee-mon meaning "where there is plenty to eat."
Sanilac County	Michigan	Named for Sanilac, a Wyandot (Huron) chief.
Sanpete County	Utah	Named for Sanpitch, a Ute chief.
Santa Barbara County	California	Named for Santa Barbara, California, named for the Santa Barbara Channel, named for Saint Barbara.
Santa Clara County	California	Named for Santa Clara, California, named for the Mission Santa Clara de Asís, itself named for Saint Clare of Assisi.
Santa Cruz County	Arizona	Named for the Santa Cruz River. ("Holy Cross" in Spanish)
Santa Cruz County	California	Named for Santa Cruz, California, named for the Mission Santa Cruz, itself named for Feast of the Exaltation of the Holy Cross.
Santa Fe County	New Mexico	Named for Santa Fe, New Mexico, from the Spanish for "holy faith."
Santa Rosa County	Florida	Named for Saint Rose of Viterbo.
Sarasota County	Florida	Named for Sarasota, Florida, first recorded as Zarazote, of uncertain origin.
Saratoga County	New York	From Iroquois sah-rah-ka, "the hill beside the river"
Sargent County	North Dakota	Named for H. E. Sargent, railroad executive.
Sarpy County	Nebraska	Named for Peter A. Sarpy, fur trader and businessman.
Sauk County	Wisconsin	Named for the Sauk people.
Saunders County	Nebraska	Named for Alvin Saunders, governor of the Nebraska Territory.
Sawyer County	Wisconsin	Named for Philetus Sawyer, politician.
Schenectady County	New York	Named for Schenectady, New York, from the Mohawk skahnéhtati, "beyond the pines."
Schleicher County	Texas	Named for Gustav Schleicher, engineer, politician and Confederate soldier.
Schley County	Georgia	Named for William Schley, lawyer, jurist, and politician.
Schoharie County	New York	Named for Schoharie, New York, from the Mohawk skoharle, "driftwood."
Schoolcraft County	Michigan	Named for Henry Schoolcraft, geographer, geologist, and ethnologist.
Schuyler County	Illinois	Named for Philip Schuyler, Revolutionary War general and U.S. Senator.
Schuyler County	Missouri	Named for Philip Schuyler, Revolutionary War general and U.S. Senator.
Schuyler County	New York	Named for Philip Schuyler, Revolutionary War general and U.S. Senator.
Schuylkill County	Pennsylvania	Named for the Schuylkill River, from Dutch meaning "hidden river" or "sheltered creek."
Scioto County	Ohio	Named for the Scioto River, from Wyandot skɛnǫ·tǫ, "deer."
Scotland County	Missouri	Named for Scotland.
Scotland County	North Carolina	Named for Scotland.
Scott County	Iowa	Named for General Winfield Scott.
Scott County	Kansas	Named for General Winfield Scott.
Scott County	Minnesota	Named for General Winfield Scott.
Scott County	Tennessee	Named for General Winfield Scott.
Scott County	Virginia	Named for General Winfield Scott.
Scott County	Indiana	Named for Charles Scott, 4th Governor of Kentucky.
Scott County	Kentucky	Named for Charles Scott, 4th Governor of Kentucky.
Scott County	Arkansas	Named for Andrew Scott, judge.
Scott County	Illinois	Named for Scott County, Kentucky.
Scott County	Mississippi	Named for Abram M. Scott, 7th Governor of Mississippi.
Scott County	Missouri	Named for John Scott, politician.
Scotts Bluff County	Nebraska	Named for Scotts Bluff, named for mountain man and trapper Hiram Scott.
Screven County	Georgia	Named for General James Screven, Revolutionary War soldier.
Scurry County	Texas	Named for William Read Scurry, Confederate general.
Searcy County	Arkansas	Named for Richard Searcy, first clerk and judge in the Arkansas Territory.
Sebastian County	Arkansas	Named for William K. Sebastian, U.S. Senator.
Sedgwick County	Colorado	Named for Fort Sedgwick, an Army post itself named for Civil War general John Sedgwick.
Sedgwick County	Kansas	Named for Civil War general John Sedgwick.
Seminole County	Florida	Named for the Seminole people.
Seminole County	Georgia	Named for the Seminole people.
Seminole County	Oklahoma	Named for the Seminole people.
Seneca County	New York	Named for the Seneca people.
Seneca County	Ohio	Named for the Seneca people.
Sequatchie County	Tennessee	From a Cherokee chief, whose name was from Cherokee siqua utsetsisti, "opossum, he grins or runs".
Sequoyah County	Oklahoma	Named for Sequoyah, Cherokee linguist.
Sevier County	Arkansas	Named for Ambrose Hundley Sevier, politician.
Sevier County	Tennessee	Named for John Sevier (1745–1815), governor of the State of Franklin and first Governor of Tennessee.
Sevier County	Utah	Named for the Sevier River (Spanish: Río Severo, "harsh river").
Seward County	Kansas	Named for William H. Seward, U.S. Secretary of State and opponent of slavery.
Seward County	Nebraska	Named for William H. Seward, U.S. Secretary of State and opponent of slavery.
Shackelford County	Texas	Named for Jack Shackelford, doctor and soldier of the Texas Revolution.
Shannon County	Missouri	Named for George Shannon, explorer on the Lewis and Clark Expedition.
Sharkey County	Mississippi	Named for William L. Sharkey, 25th Governor of Mississippi.
Sharp County	Arkansas	Named for Ephraim Sharp, a state legislator.
Shasta County	California	Named for Mount Shasta, named in turn for the Shasta people.
Shawano County	Wisconsin	From Sawanoh, a Menominee chief.
Shawnee County	Kansas	Named for the Shawnee people.
Sheboygan County	Wisconsin	Named for the Sheboygan River, from Chippewa Shawb-wa-way-gun, meaning "hollow bone", "noise underground" or "river disappearing underground."
Shelby County	Alabama	Named for Isaac Shelby, soldier and politician.
Shelby County	Illinois	Named for Isaac Shelby, soldier and politician.
Shelby County	Indiana	Named for Isaac Shelby, soldier and politician.
Shelby County	Iowa	Named for Isaac Shelby, soldier and politician.
Shelby County	Kentucky	Named for Isaac Shelby, soldier and politician.
Shelby County	Missouri	Named for Isaac Shelby, soldier and politician.
Shelby County	Ohio	Named for Isaac Shelby, soldier and politician.
Shelby County	Tennessee	Named for Isaac Shelby, soldier and politician.
Shelby County	Texas	Named for Isaac Shelby, soldier and politician.
Shenandoah County	Virginia	Named for the Shenandoah River, named for the Senedo people.
Sherburne County	Minnesota	Named for Moses Sherburne, politician and judge.
Sheridan County	Kansas	Named for Philip Sheridan, U.S. Army general.
Sheridan County	Montana	Named for Philip Sheridan, U.S. Army general.
Sheridan County	Nebraska	Named for Philip Sheridan, U.S. Army general.
Sheridan County	North Dakota	Named for Philip Sheridan, U.S. Army general.
Sheridan County	Wyoming	Named for Philip Sheridan, U.S. Army general.
Sherman County	Kansas	Named for Founding Father Roger Sherman.
Sherman County	Nebraska	Named for Founding Father Roger Sherman.
Sherman County	Oregon	Named for Founding Father Roger Sherman.
Sherman County	Texas	Named for Founding Father Roger Sherman.
Shiawassee County	Michigan	Named for the Shiawassee River, from the Chippewa shia-was-see, "river straight ahead."
Shoshone County	Idaho	Named for the Shoshone people.
Sibley County	Minnesota	Named for Henry Hastings Sibley, first Governor of Minnesota.
Sierra County	California	Named for the Sierra Nevada ("snowy jagged mountain range").
Sierra County	New Mexico	Named for the Black Range (Spanish: Sierra Diablo).
Silver Bow County	Montana	Named for the Silver Bow Creek, named for how it sparkled in the sun.
Simpson County	Kentucky	Named for John Simpson, soldier and politician.
Simpson County	Mississippi	Named for Josiah Simpson, judge.
Sioux County	Iowa	Named for the Sioux (Oceti Sakowin) people.
Sioux County	Nebraska	Named for the Sioux (Oceti Sakowin) people.
Sioux County	North Dakota	Named for the Sioux (Oceti Sakowin) people.
Siskiyou County	California	Named for the Siskiyou Trail, of unclear origin: Chinook Jargon for "bob-tailed horse," or French six callioux, "six stones."
Sitka City and Borough	Alaska	From Tlingit Shee At'iká, "people on the outside of Baranof Island."
Skagit County	Washington	Named for the Skagit peoples.
Skamania County	Washington	From the Cascades Chinook sk'mániak, "swift waters."
Slope County	North Dakota	Named for the Missouri Slope, a geographical feature.
Smith County	Kansas	Named for J. Nelson Smith, Union soldier in the Civil War.
Smith County	Mississippi	Named for David Smith, Revolutionary War major.
Smith County	Tennessee	Named for Revolutionary War officer and U.S. Senator Daniel Smith
Smith County	Texas	Named for James Smith, a general during the Texas Revolution.
Smyth County	Virginia	Named for Alexander Smyth, politician.
Snohomish County	Washington	Named for the Snohomish River and the Snohomish people.
Snyder County	Pennsylvania	Named for Simon Snyder, third Governor of Pennsylvania.
Socorro County	New Mexico	Named for Socorro, New Mexico, from the Spanish socorro, "help, aid."
Solano County	California	Named for Sem-Yeto, Suisun chief baptized as Francisco Solano.
Somerset County	Maine	Named for Somerset, England.
Somerset County	Maryland	Named for Mary, Lady Somerset, wife of Sir John Somerset and daughter of Thomas Arundell, 1st Baron Arundell of Wardour.
Somerset County	New Jersey	Named for Somerset, England.
Somerset County	Pennsylvania	Named for Somerset, England.
Somervell County	Texas	Named for Alexander Somervell, Secretary of War of the Republic of Texas.
Sonoma County	California	Named for the city of Sonoma, California, from the Miwok sonoma, "many moons."
Southampton County	Virginia	Named for either Southampton, England, or Henry Wriothesley, 3rd Earl of Southampton.
Southeast Fairbanks Census Area	Alaska	Named for its location to the southeast of Fairbanks, Alaska
Spalding County	Georgia	Named for Thomas Spalding, politician.
Spartanburg County	South Carolina	Named for Spartanburg, South Carolina, from a local militia called the Spartan Regiment in the Revolutionary War.
Spencer County	Indiana	Named for Spier Spencer, soldier.
Spencer County	Kentucky	Named for Spier Spencer, soldier.
Spink County	South Dakota	Named for S. L. Spink, politician.
Spokane County	Washington	Named for the Spokane people.
Spotsylvania County	Virginia	Named for Alexander Spotswood, Lieutenant Governor of Virginia.
St. Bernard Parish	Louisiana	Named for Saint Bernard of Clairvaux, who was the patron saint of colonial administrator Bernardo de Gálvez, 1st Viscount of Galveston.
St. Charles County	Missouri	Named for Saint Charles Borromeo.
St. Charles Parish	Louisiana	Named for Saint Charles Borromeo.
St. Clair County	Alabama	Named for Arthur St. Clair, major general in the Revolutionary War and first Governor of the Northwest Territory.
St. Clair County	Illinois	Named for Arthur St. Clair, major general in the Revolutionary War and first Governor of the Northwest Territory.
St. Clair County	Michigan	Named for Lake St. Clair, named in honor of Saint Clare of Assisi.
St. Clair County	Missouri	Named for Arthur St. Clair, major general in the Revolutionary War and first Governor of the Northwest Territory.
St. Croix County	Wisconsin	Named for the St. Croix River.
St. Francis County	Arkansas	Named for the St. Francis River.
St. Francois County	Missouri	Named for the St. Francis River.
St. Helena Parish	Louisiana	Named for Saint Helena.
St. James Parish	Louisiana	Named for Saint James.
St. John the Baptist Parish	Louisiana	Named for John the Baptist.
St. Johns County	Florida	Named for the San Juan del Puerto mission ("Saint John of the Port").
St. Joseph County	Indiana	Named for the St. Joseph River.
St. Joseph County	Michigan	Named for Fort St. Joseph in Niles, which was named for Saint Joseph.
St. Landry Parish	Louisiana	Named for St. Landry Catholic Church, named in honor of Saint Landry of Paris (Landericus).
St. Lawrence County	New York	Named for the Saint Lawrence River, named in honor of Saint Lawrence.
City of St. Louis	Missouri	Named for Saint Louis (King Louis IX of France).
St. Louis County	Minnesota	Named for the Saint Louis River, named by Pierre Gaultier de Varennes, sieur de La Vérendrye after the Order of Saint Louis that he received.
St. Louis County	Missouri	Named for Saint Louis (King Louis IX of France).
St. Lucie County	Florida	Named for the St. Lucie Inlet, named in turn for Saint Lucy.
St. Martin Parish	Louisiana	Named for Saint Martin of Tours.
St. Mary Parish	Louisiana	Named for Mary, mother of Jesus.
St. Mary's County	Maryland	Named for St. Mary's City, Maryland, named in honor of Mary, mother of Jesus.
St. Tammany Parish	Louisiana	Named for Tamanend, a Lenni-Lenape chief in the Delaware Valley during the 17th century who made peace with William Penn.
Stafford County	Kansas	Named for Lewis Stafford, Union soldier in the Civil War.
Stafford County	Virginia	Named for Staffordshire, England.
Stanislaus County	California	Named for the Stanislaus River, named in turn for Estanislao, a Lakisamni leader.
Stanley County	South Dakota	Named for David S. Stanley, Union Army Civil War general.
Stanly County	North Carolina	Named for John Stanly, politician.
Stanton County	Kansas	Named for Edwin Stanton, U.S. Attorney General and Secretary of War.
Stanton County	Nebraska	Named for Edwin Stanton, U.S. Attorney General and Secretary of War.
City of Staunton	Virginia	Named for Lady Rebecca Staunton, wife of Virginia colonial governor Sir William Gooch, 1st Baronet.
Stark County	Illinois	Named for John Stark, general in the Revolutionary War.
Stark County	North Dakota	Named for George Stark, a vice president of the Northern Pacific Railroad.
Stark County	Ohio	Named for John Stark, general in the Revolutionary War.
Starke County	Indiana	Named for John Stark, general in the Revolutionary War.
Starr County	Texas	Named for James Harper Starr, director of the postal service of the Trans-Mississippi Department.
Ste. Genevieve County	Missouri	Named for Ste. Genevieve, Missouri, named for Saint Genevieve.
Stearns County	Minnesota	Named for Charles Thomas Stearns, politician.
Steele County	Minnesota	Named for Franklin Steele, early settler.
Steele County	North Dakota	Named for Edward H. Steele, businessman.
Stephens County	Georgia	Named for Alexander Stephens, Vice President of the Confederate States of America.
Stephens County	Oklahoma	Named for John Hall Stephens, Texas politician.
Stephens County	Texas	Named for Alexander Stephens, Vice President of the Confederate States of America.
Stephenson County	Illinois	Named for Benjamin Stephenson, politician.
Sterling County	Texas	Named for W. S. Sterling, an early settler.
Steuben County	Indiana	Named for Baron Frederick von Steuben, an officer of the Revolutionary War.
Steuben County	New York	Named for Baron Frederick von Steuben, an officer of the Revolutionary War.
Stevens County	Kansas	Named for Thaddeus Stevens, politician.
Stevens County	Minnesota	Named for Isaac Stevens, soldier and first Governor of Washington Territory.
Stevens County	Washington	Named for Isaac Stevens, soldier and first Governor of Washington Territory.
Stewart County	Georgia	Named for General Daniel Stewart.
Stewart County	Tennessee	Named for Duncan Stewart, Tennessee state legislator and lieutenant governor of Mississippi Territory.
Stillwater County	Montana	Named for the Stillwater River.
Stoddard County	Missouri	Named for Amos Stoddard, soldier.
Stokes County	North Carolina	Named for John Stokes, judge.
Stone County	Arkansas	Named for its rocky terrain.
Stone County	Mississippi	Named for John Marshall Stone, 31st and 33rd Governor of Mississippi.
Stone County	Missouri	Named for William Stone, early settler.
Stonewall County	Texas	Named for Lieutenant General Thomas Jonathan "Stonewall" Jackson
Storey County	Nevada	Named for Edward Farris Storey, Nevada settler killed by Paiute.
Story County	Iowa	Named for Joseph Story, a preeminent United States Supreme Court Justice.
Strafford County	New Hampshire	Named for William Wentworth, 2nd Earl of Strafford, English nobleman.
Stutsman County	North Dakota	Named for Enos Stutsman, lawyer and politician.
Sublette County	Wyoming	Named for William Sublette, mountain man and fur trapper.
City of Suffolk	Virginia	Named for Suffolk, England.
Suffolk County	Massachusetts	Named for Suffolk, England.
Suffolk County	New York	Named for Suffolk, England.
Sullivan County	Indiana	Named for Daniel Sullivan, a soldier of the Revolutionary War.
Sullivan County	Missouri	Named for John Sullivan, General in the Revolutionary War and Governor of New Hampshire.
Sullivan County	New Hampshire	Named for John Sullivan, General in the Revolutionary War and Governor of New Hampshire.
Sullivan County	New York	Named for John Sullivan, General in the Revolutionary War and Governor of New Hampshire.
Sullivan County	Pennsylvania	Named for Charles C. Sullivan, politician.
Sullivan County	Tennessee	Named for John Sullivan, Governor of New Hampshire.
Sully County	South Dakota	Named for Alfred Sully, soldier.
Summers County	West Virginia	Named for George W. Summers, politician.
Summit County	Colorado	Named for the numerous mountain peaks which fill the region, including Grays Peak and Torreys Peak.
Summit County	Ohio	Named for the highest elevation on the Ohio and Erie Canal.
Summit County	Utah	Named for the summits of the Wasatch Range and Uinta Mountains.
Sumner County	Kansas	Named for Jethro Sumner (1733–1785), an American colonist who defended North Carolina against the British in 1780.
Sumner County	Tennessee	Named for Jethro Sumner (1733–1785), an American colonist who defended North Carolina against the British in 1780.
Sumter County	Alabama	Named for Thomas Sumter, general in the Revolutionary War.
Sumter County	Florida	Named for Thomas Sumter, general in the Revolutionary War.
Sumter County	Georgia	Named for Thomas Sumter, general in the Revolutionary War.
Sumter County	South Carolina	Named for Thomas Sumter, general in the Revolutionary War.
Sunflower County	Mississippi	Named for the Sunflower River.
Surry County	North Carolina	Named for Surrey, England.
Surry County	Virginia	Named for Surrey, England.
Susquehanna County	Pennsylvania	Named for the Susquehanna River, from Unami Sisa'we'hak'hanna, “Oyster River”
Sussex County	Delaware	Named for Sussex, England.
Sussex County	New Jersey	Named for Sussex, England.
Sussex County	Virginia	Named for Sussex, England.
Sutter County	California	Named for Sutter's Fort, built by John Sutter.
Sutton County	Texas	Named for John S. Sutton, Confederate officer.
Suwannee County	Florida	Named for the Suwannee River.
Swain County	North Carolina	Named for David Lowry Swain, 26th Governor of North Carolina.
Sweet Grass County	Montana	Named for the abundant sweet grass (Muhlenbergia sericea).
Sweetwater County	Wyoming	Named for the Sweetwater River.
Swift County	Minnesota	Named for Henry Adoniram Swift, 3rd Governor of Minnesota.
Swisher County	Texas	Named for James G. Swisher, a soldier of the Texas Revolution.
Switzerland County	Indiana	Named for Switzerland, homeland of many of the early settlers.

== T ==
County name	State	Origin
Talbot County	Georgia	Named for Matthew Talbot, 30th Governor of Georgia.
Talbot County	Maryland	Named for Grace, Lady Talbot, the wife of Sir Robert Talbot, an Irish statesman, and the sister of Cecil Calvert, 2nd Baron Baltimore.
Taliaferro County	Georgia	Named for Colonel Benjamin Taliaferro of Virginia, an officer in the American Revolution.
Talladega County	Alabama	The name Talladega is derived from a Muscogee (Creek) Native American word Tvlvteke, from the Creek tålwa, meaning "town", and åtigi, or "border" -- "Border Town"—a town indicating its location on the boundary between the lands of the Creek tribe and those of the Cherokee and Chickasaw.
Tallahatchie County	Mississippi	Choctaw name meaning "rock of waters".
Tallapoosa County	Alabama	Name of Creek origin.
Tama County	Iowa	Named for Taimah, a leader of the Meskwaki.
Taney County	Missouri	Named in honor of Roger Brooke Taney, fifth Chief Justice of the U.S. Supreme Court.
Tangipahoa Parish	Louisiana	Tangipahoa comes from an Acolapissa word meaning "ear of corn" or "those who gather corn."
Taos County	New Mexico	"Place of red willows" in the Taos language.
Tarrant County	Texas	Named in honor of General Edward H. Tarrant.
Tate County	Mississippi	Named for Thomas Simpson Tate, one of the first prominent settlers of the area.
Tattnall County	Georgia	Named for Josiah Tattnall Sr., U.S. Senator and 25th Governor of Georgia.
Taylor County	Florida	Named for Zachary Taylor, twelfth President of the United States of America.
Taylor County	Georgia	Named for Zachary Taylor, twelfth President of the United States of America.
Taylor County	Iowa	Named for Zachary Taylor, twelfth President of the United States of America.
Taylor County	Kentucky	Named for Zachary Taylor, twelfth President of the United States of America.
Taylor County	Texas	Named for Edward Taylor, George Taylor, and James Taylor, three brothers who died at the Battle of the Alamo.
Taylor County	West Virginia	Named for Sen. John Taylor of Caroline.
Taylor County	Wisconsin	Probably named for William Robert Taylor, 12th Governor of Wisconsin
Tazewell County	Illinois	Named in honor of Littleton Waller Tazewell, U.S. Senator and Governor of Virginia, and/or Littleton's father, prominent Virginia politician Henry Tazewell.
Tazewell County	Virginia	Named after Henry Tazewell, a United States senator from Virginia as well as a state legislator and judge.
Tehama County	California	Named after Tehama, California; possibly from Spanish tejamanil ("shingle"), or a Native word for "high water."
Telfair County	Georgia	Named for Edward Telfair, sixteenth governor of Georgia and member of the Continental Congress.
Teller County	Colorado	Named for Henry M. Teller, a U.S. Senator and the 15th United States Secretary of the Interior.
Tensas Parish	Louisiana	Derived from the Taensa people.
Terrebonne Parish	Louisiana	French for "good land" or "good earth".
Terrell County	Georgia	Named for U.S. Representative William Terrell.
Terrell County	Texas	Named for Texas state senator Alexander W. Terrell.
Terry County	Texas	Named for Benjamin Franklin Terry, a colonel in the Confederate Army.
Teton County	Idaho	Named after the Teton Mountains.
Teton County	Montana	Named for the Teton River (Montana)
Teton County	Wyoming	Named for the Teton Range
Texas County	Missouri	Named after the Republic of Texas.
Texas County	Oklahoma	So named because it was wholly included within the limits of the Texas Cession of 1850, whereby the ownership of the area was passed from the State of Texas to the United States Government.
Thayer County	Nebraska	Named after the General and Governor John Milton Thayer.
Thomas County	Georgia	Named for Jett Thomas, officer in the War of 1812; also known for overseeing the construction of the first building at the University of Georgia as well as the state capitol at Milledgeville.
Thomas County	Kansas	Named for George Henry Thomas, Union General in the American Civil War.
Thomas County	Nebraska	Named after General George H. Thomas.
Throckmorton County	Texas	Named for William Throckmorton, an early Collin County settler.
Thurston County	Nebraska	Named after U.S. Senator John M. Thurston.
Thurston County	Washington	Named after Samuel R. Thurston, the Oregon Territory's first delegate to Congress.
Tift County	Georgia	Named for Nelson Tift, founder of the city of Albany and United States Representative.
Tillamook County	Oregon	Named for the Tillamook, a Native American tribe.
Tillman County	Oklahoma	Benjamin Tillman, U.S. Senator and 84th Governor of South Carolina
Tioga County	New York	Derived from an American Indian word meaning "at the forks", describing a meeting place.
Tioga County	Pennsylvania	Named for the Tioga River.
Tippah County	Mississippi	The name "Tippah" is a Chickasaw word meaning "cut off", and is taken from the creek of the same name that flows across much of the original county from northeast to southwest before emptying into the Tallahatchie River. The creek probably was so named because it, and the ridges on either side, "cut off" the western part of the region from the eastern portion.
Tippecanoe County	Indiana	Named for the Tippecanoe River and the Battle of Tippecanoe.
Tipton County	Indiana	Tipton is named for John Tipton, a soldier of the Battle of Tippecanoe.
Tipton County	Tennessee	Named for Jacob Tipton, who was killed by Native Americans in a conflict over the Northwest Territory.
Tishomingo County	Mississippi	Tishomingo (1734–1838), a Chickasaw chieftain
Titus County	Texas	Named for Andrew Jackson Titus, an early settler.
Todd County	Kentucky	Named after John Todd, an early frontier military figure.
Todd County	Minnesota	Named after John Blair Smith Todd, delegate from Dakota Territory to the United States House of Representatives and General in the Union Army during the American Civil War.
Todd County	South Dakota	Named after John Blair Smith Todd, delegate from Dakota Territory to the United States House of Representatives and General in the Union Army during the American Civil War.
Tolland County	Connecticut	Named for the town of Tolland, Connecticut, which itself is named after Tolland, Somerset.
Tom Green County	Texas	Named for Thomas Green, a Confederate brigadier general.
Tompkins County	New York	Named in honor of Daniel D. Tompkins, Governor of New York and Vice President of the United States of America.
Tooele County	Utah	It is thought that the name derives from a Native American chief, but controversy exists about whether such chief lived. Alternate explanations hypothesize that the name comes from "tu-wanda", the Goshute word for "bear", or from "tule", a Spanish word of Aztec origins meaning "bulrush" (Schoenoplectus).
Toole County	Montana	Named for Joseph Toole, Montana's first governor.
Toombs County	Georgia	Named for Robert Toombs, United States representative and senator.
Torrance County	New Mexico	Named for Francis J. Torrance, a promoter of the New Mexico Central Railroad.
Towner County	North Dakota	Named after Oscar M. Towner, a member of the United States House of Representatives.
Towns County	Georgia	Named for lawyer, legislator, and politician George W. Towns.
Traill County	North Dakota	Named after Walter John Strickland Traill, an employee of the Hudson's Bay Company and son of Canadian pioneer Catharine Parr Traill.
Transylvania County	North Carolina	Derived from the Transylvania Company and has Latin origins: trans ("across") and silva or sylva ("woods").
Traverse County	Minnesota	Named for Lake Traverse
Travis County	Texas	Named in honor of William Barret Travis, commander of the Republic of Texas forces at the Battle of the Alamo.
Treasure County	Montana	From the state nickname of Montana, the "Treasure State", so called because of its gold and silver mines.
Trego County	Kansas	Named for Edgar Poe Trego of the 8th Kansas Volunteer Infantry Regiment, killed at the 1863 Battle of Chickamauga.
Trempealeau County	Wisconsin	French fur traders were the first Europeans to enter this land. At the mouth of the Trempealeau River, which flows from northeast to southwest across the county on its way to the Mississippi River, they found a bluff surrounded by water and called it "La Montagne qui trempe à l'eau", which means "mountain with its foot in the water." The name was later shortened.
Treutlen County	Georgia	Named for John A. Treutlen, Georgia's first state governor following adoption of the state Constitution of 1777.
Trigg County	Kentucky	Named for Stephen Trigg, a frontier officer in the American Revolutionary War who died in the Battle of Blue Licks.
Trimble County	Kentucky	Named for Robert Trimble, attorney, judge, and justice of the United States Supreme Court.
Trinity County	California	Named after the Trinity River, which was named in 1845 by Major Pierson B. Reading, who was under the mistaken impression that the river emptied into Trinidad Bay. Trinity is the English translation of Trinidad.
Trinity County	Texas	Named after the Trinity River (Texas).
Tripp County	South Dakota	Named for Bartlett Tripp.
Troup County	Georgia	Named for George Troup, thirty-fourth governor of Georgia, U.S. representative, and senator.
Trousdale County	Tennessee	Named for William Trousdale, Creek and Mexican–American War soldier and officer, state senator and Governor of Tennessee.
Trumbull County	Ohio	Named for Jonathan Trumbull, Governor of Connecticut, who once owned the land in the region.
Tualatai County	American Samoa	Tuālā, v. to put a canoe before the wind; n. the back of a sail. The ‘tai’ suffix designates this county as being the Tuālā county on the side towards the sea, whereas Tuālā-uta is the Tuālā county on the side towards the land or inland.
Tucker County	West Virginia	Named after Henry St. George Tucker, Sr., a judge and Congressman from Williamsburg, Virginia.
Tulare County	California	Named for Tulare Lake.
Tulsa County	Oklahoma	Named for Tulsa, Oklahoma, which takes its name from the Creek Tallasi, "old town."
Tunica County	Mississippi	Named for the Tunica Native Americans.
Tuolumne County	California	The name Tuolumne is of Native American origin and has been given different meanings, such as Many Stone Houses, The Land of Mountain Lions and, Straight Up Steep, the latter an interpretation of William Fuller, a native Chief. Mariano Vallejo, in his report to the first California State Legislature, said that the word is "a corruption of the Miwok word talmalamne which signifies 'cluster of stone wigwams.'" The name may mean "people who dwell in stone houses", i.e., in caves.
Turner County	Georgia	Named for Henry G. Turner, U.S. representative and Georgia state Supreme Court justice.
Turner County	South Dakota	Named for John W. Turner.
Tuscaloosa County	Alabama	Named in honor of the pre-Choctaw chief Tuskaloosa.
Tuscarawas County	Ohio	The name is a Delaware word variously translated as "old town" or "open mouth".
Tuscola County	Michigan	Neologism created by Henry Schoolcraft.
Twiggs County	Georgia	Named for American Revolutionary War general John Twiggs.
Twin Falls County	Idaho	The county is named for a split waterfall on the Snake River of the same name. The Snake River is the county's northern boundary.
Tyler County	Texas	Named for John Tyler, the tenth President of the United States.
Tyler County	West Virginia	Named after John Tyler, Sr., father of President John Tyler.
Tyrrell County	North Carolina	Named for Sir John Tyrrell, one of the Lords Proprietors of Carolina.

== U ==
County name	State	Origin
Uinta County	Wyoming	Named for the Uinta(h), a Native American tribe associated with the Ute people.
Uintah County	Utah	Named for the Uinta(h), a Native American tribe associated with the Ute people.
Ulster County	New York	Named for James, Duke of York (later King James II), who was also Earl of Ulster, a title derived from Ulster, the northern part of Ireland.
Umatilla County	Oregon	Named for the Umatilla River.
Unicoi County	Tennessee	Name is a Native American word for the southern Appalachian Mountains, probably meaning white or fog-draped.
Union County	Arkansas	Named in recognition of the 1829 citizens' petition for a new county, stating that they were petitioning "in the spirit of Union and Unity".
Union County	Florida	Named to honor the concept of unity.
Union County	Georgia	The Union Party, a political group that supported removing Native Americans from the area and opening it to white settlers, is the probable inspiration for the county's name.
Union County	Illinois	Named for a joint revival meeting of the Baptists and Dunkards, called a "union meeting".
Union County	Indiana	So named because it is the product of a union of parts of Fayette, Franklin and Wayne counties, as united into one county in 1821.
Union County	Iowa	Named in honour of the Union which the people wished to preserve at the time of founding (1853).
Union County	Kentucky	Named for the unanimous decision of the residents to unite together and create a new county.
Union County	Mississippi	This county was formed as a union of pieces of several other counties.
Union County	New Jersey	In reference to the Federal Union of the United States.
Union County	New Mexico	The county is named "Union" because the citizens, in 1893/94, were united in their desire for the creation of a new county out of three existing New Mexico counties.
Union County	North Carolina	Its name was a compromise between Whigs, who wanted to name the new county for Henry Clay, and Democrats, who wanted to name it for Andrew Jackson.
Union County	Ohio	The name is reflective of the county's origins, being the union of pieces of Franklin, Delaware, Madison, and Logan Counties.
Union County	Oregon	The name, which is taken from the city of Union within the county's borders, references the Union states, or Northern States, of the American Civil War.
Union County	Pennsylvania	The name is an allusion to the Federal Union.
Union County	South Carolina	Received its name from the old Union Church near Monarch Mill.
Union County	South Dakota	Originally named Cole County, the named was changed to Union because of Civil War sentiment.
Union County	Tennessee	Named either for its creation from parts of five counties or to memorialize East Tennessee's support for preservation of the Union in the years before the Civil War.
Union Parish	Louisiana	Reportedly took its name from a statement made by Daniel Webster: "liberty and union, now and forever, one and inseparable".
Upshur County	Texas	Named for Abel P. Upshur, who was U.S. Secretary of State during President John Tyler's administration.
Upshur County	West Virginia	Named for Abel P. Upshur, who was U.S. Secretary of State during President John Tyler's administration.
Upson County	Georgia	Named in honor of noted Georgia lawyer Stephen Upson.
Upton County	Texas	Named for brothers John C. and William F. Upton, both Colonels in the Confederate army.
Utah County	Utah	Named for the Spanish name (Yuta) for the Ute.
Uvalde County	Texas	Named for Juan de Ugalde, the Spanish governor of Coahuila.

== V ==
County name	State	Origin
Val Verde County	Texas	Named for the 1862 Civil War Battle of Val Verde (val verde meaning "green valley" in Spanish).
Valencia County	New Mexico	Named for Valencia, New Mexico, named in turn for Valencia, Spain.
Valley County	Idaho	Named after the Long Valley of the North Fork of the Payette River.
Valley County	Montana	Named for the valley of the Milk River.
Valley County	Nebraska	Named after the geological features of the area.
Van Buren County	Arkansas	Named for U.S. President Martin Van Buren (1782–1862).
Van Buren County	Iowa	Named for U.S. President Martin Van Buren (1782–1862).
Van Buren County	Michigan	Named for U.S. President Martin Van Buren (1782–1862).
Van Buren County	Tennessee	Named for U.S. President Martin Van Buren (1782–1862).
Van Wert County	Ohio	Named for Isaac Van Wart, one of the captors of John André in the American Revolutionary War.
Van Zandt County	Texas	Named for Isaac Van Zandt, a member of the Congress of the Republic of Texas.
Vance County	North Carolina	Named for Zebulon Baird Vance, a Governor of North Carolina (1862–1865, 1877–1879) and United States senator (1879–1894).
Vanderburgh County	Indiana	Named for Henry Vanderburgh, a judge for Indiana Territory.
Venango County	Pennsylvania	The origin of the name "Venango" comes from the Native American name for the region, Onenge, meaning Otter. This was corrupted into English as the Venango River.
Ventura County	California	From Mission San Buenaventura, named for Saint Bonaventure.
Vermilion County	Illinois	Named for the Vermilion River (Wabash River tributary).
Vermilion Parish	Louisiana	Named for Vermilion River (Louisiana).
Vermillion County	Indiana	Vermillion is named for the Vermilion River (Wabash River tributary).
Vernon County	Missouri	Named for Col. Miles Vernon (1786–1867), a state senator and veteran of the Battle of New Orleans.
Vernon County	Wisconsin	Named for Mount Vernon.
Vernon Parish	Louisiana	Various theories for the naming exist (see History of Vernon Parish)
Victoria County	Texas	Named for Guadalupe Victoria, the first President of Mexico.
Vigo County	Indiana	Named for Francis Vigo, an Italian tradesman from St. Louis who assisted George Rogers Clark's campaigns during the American Revolutionary War.
Vilas County	Wisconsin	Named for William Freeman Vilas, United States Senator (1891–1897).
Vinton County	Ohio	Named for Samuel Finley Vinton, a 19th-century congressman from Ohio.
City of Virginia Beach	Virginia	State of Virginia and its beach.
Volusia County	Florida	Named for Volusia, Florida, possibly derived from a name meaning "land of the Yuchi."

== W ==
County name	State	Origin
Wabash County	Illinois	Named for the Wabash River, from the Miami-Illinois waapaahšiiki, "it shines white."
Wabash County	Indiana	Named for the Wabash River, from the Miami-Illinois waapaahšiiki, "it shines white."
Wabasha County	Minnesota	Named for the Mdewakanton Dakota mixed-blood (with Anishinaabe) chiefs Wapi-sha (wáȟpe šá - leaf red), father (1718–1806), son (1768–1855), and grandson (±1816-1876) of the same name.
Wabaunsee County	Kansas	Named for Waubonsie, a Potawatomi chief.
Wadena County	Minnesota	Named for the Wadena trading post, named for an Ojibwe chief.
Wagoner County	Oklahoma	Named for Henry "Bigfoot" Wagoner, a Missouri–Kansas–Texas Railroad dispatcher.
Wahkiakum County	Washington	Named for Chief Wahkiakum ("Tall Timber") of the Chinook.
Wake County	North Carolina	Named for Margaret Wake Tryon, wife of William Tryon, who served as the Colonial Governor of North Carolina and the Colonial Governor of New York.
Wakulla County	Florida	Named for the Wakulla River, named for a Muscogee chief.
Waldo County	Maine	Named for Samuel Waldo, merchant and political figure.
Walker County	Alabama	Named for John Williams Walker, U.S. Senator.
Walker County	Georgia	Named for Freeman Walker, politician.
Walker County	Texas	Robert J. Walker; "renamed" in honor of Samuel Hamilton Walker (no relation)
Walla Walla County	Washington	Named for the Walla Walla (Waluulapam) people.
Wallace County	Kansas	Named for W. H. L. Wallace, Union general in the Civil War.
Waller County	Texas	Named for Edwin Waller, entrepreneur and town planner.
Wallowa County	Oregon	Named for the Wallowa River, from Nez Perce wil-le-wah, "winding water" or "fishing weir."
Walsh County	North Dakota	Named for George H. Walsh, newspaper editor and politician.
Walthall County	Mississippi	Named for Edward C. Walthall, Confederate general.
Walton County	Florida	Named for Colonel George Walton, Jr., secretary of the Florida Territory.
Walton County	Georgia	Named for George Walton, signatory to the Declaration of Independence.
Walworth County	South Dakota	Named for Walworth County, Wisconsin.
Walworth County	Wisconsin	Named for Reuben H. Walworth, lawyer, jurist and politician.
Wapello County	Iowa	Named for Wapello, Meskwaki (Fox) chief.
Ward County	North Dakota	Named for Mark Ward, chairman of the House of Representatives Committee on Counties.
Ward County	Texas	Named for Thomas W. Ward, soldier and politician.
Ware County	Georgia	Named for Nicholas Ware, politician.
Warren County	Georgia	Named for Joseph Warren, Revolutionary War leader.
Warren County	Illinois	Named for Joseph Warren, Revolutionary War leader.
Warren County	Indiana	Named for Joseph Warren, Revolutionary War leader.
Warren County	Iowa	Named for Joseph Warren, Revolutionary War leader.
Warren County	Kentucky	Named for Joseph Warren, Revolutionary War leader.
Warren County	Mississippi	Named for Joseph Warren, Revolutionary War leader.
Warren County	Missouri	Named for Joseph Warren, Revolutionary War leader.
Warren County	New Jersey	Named for Joseph Warren, Revolutionary War leader.
Warren County	New York	Named for Joseph Warren, Revolutionary War leader.
Warren County	North Carolina	Named for Joseph Warren, Revolutionary War leader.
Warren County	Ohio	Named for Joseph Warren, Revolutionary War leader.
Warren County	Pennsylvania	Named for Joseph Warren, Revolutionary War leader.
Warren County	Tennessee	Named for Joseph Warren, Revolutionary War leader.
Warren County	Virginia	Named for Joseph Warren, Revolutionary War leader.
Warrick County	Indiana	Named for Jacob Warrick, a notable soldier of the Battle of Tippecanoe.
Wasatch County	Utah	From a Ute word for "mountain pass."
Wasco County	Oregon	Named for the Wasco people.
Waseca County	Minnesota	Named for Waseca, Minnesota, from a Dakota word meaning "rich."
Washakie County	Wyoming	Named for Washakie, a Shoshone chief.
Washburn County	Wisconsin	Named for Cadwallader C. Washburn, Governor of Wisconsin.
Washington County	Alabama	Named for George Washington, first President of the United States.
Washington County	Arkansas	Named for George Washington, first President of the United States.
Washington County	Colorado	Named for George Washington, first President of the United States.
Washington County	Florida	Named for George Washington, first President of the United States.
Washington County	Georgia	Named for George Washington, first President of the United States.
Washington County	Idaho	Named for George Washington, first President of the United States.
Washington County	Illinois	Named for George Washington, first President of the United States.
Washington County	Indiana	Named for George Washington, first President of the United States.
Washington County	Iowa	Named for George Washington, first President of the United States.
Washington County	Kansas	Named for George Washington, first President of the United States.
Washington County	Kentucky	Named for George Washington, first President of the United States.
Washington County	Maine	Named for George Washington, first President of the United States.
Washington County	Maryland	Named for George Washington, first President of the United States.
Washington County	Minnesota	Named for George Washington, first President of the United States.
Washington County	Mississippi	Named for George Washington, first President of the United States.
Washington County	Missouri	Named for George Washington, first President of the United States.
Washington County	Nebraska	Named for George Washington, first President of the United States.
Washington County	New York	Named for George Washington, first President of the United States.
Washington County	North Carolina	Named for George Washington, first President of the United States.
Washington County	Ohio	Named for George Washington, first President of the United States.
Washington County	Oklahoma	Named for George Washington, first President of the United States.
Washington County	Oregon	Named for George Washington, first President of the United States.
Washington County	Pennsylvania	Named for George Washington, first President of the United States.
Washington County	Rhode Island	Named for George Washington, first President of the United States.
Washington County	Tennessee	Named for George Washington, first President of the United States.
Washington County	Texas	Named for George Washington, first President of the United States.
Washington County	Utah	Named for George Washington, first President of the United States.
Washington County	Vermont	Named for George Washington, first President of the United States.
Washington County	Virginia	Named for George Washington, first President of the United States.
Washington County	Wisconsin	Named for George Washington, first President of the United States.
Washington Parish	Louisiana	Named for George Washington, first President of the United States.
Washita County	Oklahoma	Named for the Washita River, which was mistook by explorers for the Ouachita River, named for the Ouachita people.
Washoe County	Nevada	Named for the Washoe people.
Washtenaw County	Michigan	From O-wash-ta-nong ("far away water"), the Ojibwe name for the Grand River.
Watauga County	North Carolina	Named for the Watauga River.
Watonwan County	Minnesota	Named for the Watonwan River, from Dakota watanwan meaning "fish bait" or "plenty of fish."
Waukesha County	Wisconsin	Named for the city of Waukesha, Wisconsin, from Waagoshag (Wau-tsha), the leader of a local tribe.
Waupaca County	Wisconsin	From wau-pa-ka-ho-nak, a Menominee word meaning "white sand bottom" or "brave young hero."
Waushara County	Wisconsin	From a Winnebago term meaning "good earth."
Wayne County	Georgia	Named for Revolutionary War general Anthony Wayne.
Wayne County	Illinois	Named for Revolutionary War general Anthony Wayne.
Wayne County	Iowa	Named for Revolutionary War general Anthony Wayne.
Wayne County	Kentucky	Named for Revolutionary War general Anthony Wayne.
Wayne County	Michigan	Named for Revolutionary War general Anthony Wayne.
Wayne County	Mississippi	Named for Revolutionary War general Anthony Wayne.
Wayne County	Missouri	Named for Revolutionary War general Anthony Wayne.
Wayne County	Nebraska	Named for Revolutionary War general Anthony Wayne.
Wayne County	New York	Named for Revolutionary War general Anthony Wayne.
Wayne County	North Carolina	Named for Revolutionary War general Anthony Wayne.
Wayne County	Ohio	Named for Revolutionary War general Anthony Wayne.
Wayne County	Pennsylvania	Named for Revolutionary War general Anthony Wayne.
Wayne County	Tennessee	Named for Revolutionary War general Anthony Wayne.
Wayne County	Utah	Named for Wayne County, Tennessee.
Wayne County	West Virginia	Named for Revolutionary War general Anthony Wayne.
City of Waynesboro	Virginia	Named for Revolutionary War general Anthony Wayne.
Weakley County	Tennessee	Named for U.S. Representative Robert Weakley.
Webb County	Texas	Named for James Webb, who served as Secretary of the Treasury, Secretary of State, and Attorney General of the Republic of Texas
Weber County	Utah	Named for the Weber River, which was named for fur trapper John Henry Weber.
Webster County	Georgia	Named for Daniel Webster, politician.
Webster County	Iowa	Named for Daniel Webster, politician.
Webster County	Kentucky	Named for Daniel Webster, politician.
Webster County	Mississippi	Named for Daniel Webster, politician.
Webster County	Missouri	Named for Daniel Webster, politician.
Webster County	Nebraska	Named for Daniel Webster, politician.
Webster County	West Virginia	Named for Daniel Webster, politician.
Webster Parish	Louisiana	Named for Daniel Webster, politician.
Weld County	Colorado	Named for Lewis Ledyard Weld, designer of the Seal of Colorado who died while serving in the Union Army during the Civil War.
Wells County	Indiana	Named for Captain William A. Wells, a scout for General "Mad" Anthony Wayne.
Wells County	North Dakota	Named for Edward Payson Wells, banker and early promoter of the James River Valley.
West Baton Rouge Parish	Louisiana	Named for Baton Rouge, Louisiana, which is from French bâton rouge ("red stick"), a translation of Choctaw iti humma, referring to red poles used as boundary markers.
West Carroll Parish	Louisiana	Named for Charles Carroll of Carrollton, the only Catholic to sign the Declaration of Independence.
West Feliciana Parish	Louisiana	Originally part of Feliciana Parish, Louisiana, from Spanish Feliciana ("happy land") and in honor of Marie Félicité St. Maxent, wife of Bernardo de Gálvez, 1st Viscount of Galveston.
Westchester County	New York	Named for Chester, England.
Westmoreland County	Pennsylvania	Named for Westmorland, England.
Westmoreland County	Virginia	Named for Westmorland, England.
Weston County	Wyoming	Named for Jefferson B. Weston, geologist and surveyor.
Wetzel County	West Virginia	Named for Lewis Wetzel, frontiersman.
Wexford County	Michigan	Named for County Wexford, Ireland.
Wharton County	Texas	Named for William H. Wharton and John Austin Wharton, brothers and Republic of Texas leaders.
Whatcom County	Washington	Named for Whatcom (Xwotʼqom), a Nooksack chief.
Wheatland County	Montana	Named for its wheat production.
Wheeler County	Georgia	Named for Joseph Wheeler, Confederate general and, after the Civil War, a U.S. Army general.
Wheeler County	Nebraska	Named for Daniel H. Wheeler, secretary of the Nebraska State Board of Agriculture
Wheeler County	Oregon	Named for Henry H. Wheeler, early settler.
Wheeler County	Texas	Named for Royall T. Wheeler, judge.
White County	Arkansas	Named for Hugh Lawson White, a Whig candidate for President of the United States.
White County	Georgia	Named for David T. White, local politician.
White County	Illinois	Named for Leonard White, politician and soldier.
White County	Indiana	Named for Isaac White, a soldier who was killed at the Battle of Tippecanoe.
White County	Tennessee	Named for John White, Revolutionary War soldier and the first white settler in the county.
White Pine County	Nevada	Named for the Rocky Mountain white pine (limber pine, Pinus flexilis), a common tree in the county.
Whiteside County	Illinois	Named for Samuel Whiteside, pioneer.
Whitfield County	Georgia	Named for George Whitefield, Evangelical cleric.
Whitley County	Indiana	Named for Colonel William Whitley, who was killed in the War of 1812.
Whitley County	Kentucky	Named for William Whitley, pioneer.
Whitman County	Washington	Named for Marcus Whitman, physician and pioneer.
Wibaux County	Montana	Named for Pierre Wibaux, rancher.
Wichita County	Kansas	Named for the Wichita people.
Wichita County	Texas	Named for the Wichita people.
Wicomico County	Maryland	Named for the Wicomico River, from Lenape wicko-mekee, "place where houses are built."
Wilbarger County	Texas	Named for Josiah Pugh Wilbarger and Mathias Wilbarger, early settler.
Wilcox County	Alabama	Named for Joseph M. Wilcox, soldier.
Wilcox County	Georgia	Named for Mark Wilcox, Georgia state legislator and one of the founders of the Georgia Supreme Court.
Wilkes County	Georgia	Named for John Wilkes, British radical, journalist and politician.
Wilkes County	North Carolina	Named for John Wilkes, British radical, journalist and politician.
Wilkin County	Minnesota	Named for Alexander Wilkin, soldier.
Wilkinson County	Georgia	Named for James Wilkinson, soldier and statesman.
Wilkinson County	Mississippi	Named for James Wilkinson, soldier and statesman.
Will County	Illinois	Named for Dr. Conrad Will, businessman and politician.
Willacy County	Texas	Named for John G. Willacy, politician.
Williams County	North Dakota	Named for Erastus Appleman Williams, politician.
Williams County	Ohio	Named for David Williams, Revolutionary War soldier.
City of Williamsburg	Virginia	Named for King William III of England.
Williamsburg County	South Carolina	Named for King William III of England.
Williamson County	Illinois	Named for Williamson County, Tennessee, from which the first white settlers came.
Williamson County	Tennessee	Named for U.S. Representative Hugh Williamson.
Williamson County	Texas	Named for Robert McAlpin Williamson, Texas Ranger and judge.
Wilson County	Kansas	Named for Hiero Tennant Wilson, merchant.
Wilson County	North Carolina	Named for Louis Dicken Wilson, U.S. Army general.
Wilson County	Tennessee	Named for David Wilson, a member of the legislatures of North Carolina and the Southwest Territory.
Wilson County	Texas	Named for James Charles Wilson, early settler.
City of Winchester	Virginia	Named for Winchester, England, birthplace of Colonel James Wood, who laid out the community's original plan and served as the first court clerk
Windham County	Connecticut	Named for the town of Windham, Connecticut, which itself is named after the village of Windham (now Wineham), Sussex.
Windham County	Vermont	Named for Windham, Vermont, named in turn for Windham, Connecticut, which was named for Wineham (Wyndham), Sussex, England (from Old English Winda-hamm, "Winda's water meadow").
Windsor County	Vermont	Named for Windsor, Vermont, named in turn for Windsor, Connecticut, which was named for Windsor, Berkshire, England (from Old English Windles-ore, "winch by the riverside").
Winkler County	Texas	Named for Clinton McKamy Winkler, Confederate colonel.
Winn Parish	Louisiana	Named for Walter Winn, state legislator.
Winnebago County	Illinois	Named for the Winnebago (Ho-Chunk) people.
Winnebago County	Iowa	Named for the Winnebago (Ho-Chunk) people.
Winnebago County	Wisconsin	Named for the Winnebago (Ho-Chunk) people.
Winneshiek County	Iowa	Named for Winneshiek, a Ho-Chunk chief.
Winona County	Minnesota	Named for Winona, legendary Dakota woman.
Winston County	Alabama	Named for John A. Winston, 15th Governor of Alabama.
Winston County	Mississippi	Named for Louis Winston, militia colonel and judge.
Wirt County	West Virginia	Named for William Wirt, U.S. Attorney General.
Wise County	Texas	Named for Henry A. Wise, Confederate general and later politician.
Wise County	Virginia	Named for Henry A. Wise, Confederate general and later politician.
Wolfe County	Kentucky	Named for Nathaneal Wolfe, a member of the legislative assembly.
Wood County	Ohio	Named for Eleazer D. Wood, soldier.
Wood County	Texas	Named for George Tyler Wood, second Governor of Texas.
Wood County	West Virginia	Named for James Wood, 11th Governor of Virginia.
Wood County	Wisconsin	Named for Joseph Wood, pioneer and politician.
Woodbury County	Iowa	Named for Levi Woodbury, judge and politician.
Woodford County	Illinois	Named for Woodford County, Kentucky, home of many of the first pioneers.
Woodford County	Kentucky	Named for William Woodford, Revolutionary War general.
Woodruff County	Arkansas	Named for William E. Woodruff, publisher and politician.
Woods County	Oklahoma	Named for Samuel Newitt Wood, attorney, politician, and Free State advocate.
Woodson County	Kansas	Named for Daniel Woodson, Acting Territorial Governor of Kansas.
Woodward County	Oklahoma	Named for either Brinton W. Woodward, a Santa Fe Railway director, or bison hunter, teamster, and eventually local saddle-maker Richard "Uncle Dick" Woodward.
Worcester County	Maryland	Named for Mary Arundell, the wife of Sir John Somerset, a son of Henry Somerset, 1st Marquess of Worcester.
Worcester County	Massachusetts	Named for Worcester, England.
Worth County	Georgia	Named for Major General William J. Worth.
Worth County	Iowa	Named for Major General William J. Worth.
Worth County	Missouri	Named for Major General William J. Worth.
Wright County	Iowa	Named for Silas Wright, attorney and politician.
Wright County	Minnesota	Named for Silas Wright, attorney and politician.
Wright County	Missouri	Named for Silas Wright, attorney and politician.
Wyandot County	Ohio	Named for the Wyandot (Huron) people.
Wyandotte County	Kansas	Named for the Wyandot (Huron) people.
Wyoming County	New York	From a Lenape word meaning "broad bottom lands".
Wyoming County	Pennsylvania	Named for the Wyoming Valley.
Wyoming County	West Virginia	From a Lenape word meaning "broad bottom lands".
Wythe County	Virginia	Named for George Wythe, judge.

== Y ==
County name	State	Origin
Yadkin County	North Carolina	Named for the Yadkin River which is derived from Yattken, or Yattkin, a local tribe.
Yakima County	Washington	Named after the Yakama people.
Yakutat City and Borough	Alaska	From the Tlingit name Yaakwdáat, meaning "the place where canoes rest", although it may originally derive from an Eyak name which has been lost.
Yalobusha County	Mississippi	Yalobusha is a Native American word meaning "tadpole place".
Yamhill County	Oregon	Origin of name uncertain, but probably from an explorer's name for a local Native American tribe, the Yamhill, who are part of the North Kalapuyan family.
Yancey County	North Carolina	Named in honor of Bartlett Yancey, U.S. Congressman (1813–1817) and speaker of the N.C. Senate (1817–1827).
Yankton County	South Dakota	Named for the Yankton tribe of Nakota (Sioux).
Yates County	New York	Yates County is named in honor of Joseph C. Yates, seventh governor of New York (1823–1824).
Yavapai County	Arizona	Named after the Yavapai people, who were the main inhabitants of the area at the time of annexation by the United States.
Yazoo County	Mississippi	Named for the Yazoo River.
Yell County	Arkansas	Named after Archibald Yell, the state's first member of the United States House of Representatives and the second governor of Arkansas; he later fell in combat at the Battle of Buena Vista during the Mexican–American War.
Yellow Medicine County	Minnesota	From the Yellow Medicine River, which takes its name from a calque of pajutazee, the Dakota name for the bitter root of the moonseed plant (Menispermum canadense).
Yellowstone County	Montana	Named for the Yellowstone River which roughly bisects the county from southwest to northeast.
Yoakum County	Texas	Named for Henderson King Yoakum, a Texas historian.
Yolo County	California	Yolo is a Native American name variously believed to be a corruption of a tribal name Yo-loy meaning "a place abounding in rushes" or of the name of the chief Yodo or of the village of Yodoi.
York County	Maine	In 1664, what had been the province of Maine was given a grant by Charles II of England to James, Duke of York. Under the terms of this patent the territory was incorporated into Cornwall County, part of the Province of New York. The patent to James for this territory was renewed in 1674 and survives in York County.
York County	Nebraska	Either named after the city of York in England or for York County in Pennsylvania.
York County	Pennsylvania	Named either for the Duke of York, an early patron of the Penn family, or for the city and shire of York in England.
York County	South Carolina	Named for Yorkshire, England.
York County	Virginia	Named for the city of York in Northern England.
Young County	Texas	The county is named for William Cocke Young, an early Texas settler and soldier.
Yuba County	California	Named after the Yuba River for the Native American village Yubu, Yupu or Juba near the confluence of the Yuba and Feather rivers, or for the quantities of wild grapes (uvas silvestres in Spanish) growing on its banks.
Yukon-Koyukuk Census Area	Alaska	The Yukon River and one of its major tributaries, the Koyukuk River, whose respective drainages comprise the vast majority of the census area's land mass.
Yuma County	Arizona	Named for the Quechan (Yuma) indigenous people.
Yuma County	Colorado	Yuma County is named for the town of Yuma, Colorado, which itself was supposedly named for a Quechan railroad worker (or a man named "Yuma") who died near the town while building a line for the Chicago, Burlington and Quincy Railroad.

== Z ==
County name	State	Origin
Zapata County	Texas	Named after Colonel Jose Antonio de Zapata, a rancher who rebelled against Mexico in 1839.
Zavala County	Texas	Named after Lorenzo de Zavala, Mexican politician and signer of the Texas Declaration of Independence.
Ziebach County	South Dakota	Named after local leader Frank M. Ziebach.

== See also ==
- Lists of U.S. county name etymologies for links to the remainder of the list.
