= John Skene (New Jersey official) =

Scottish deputy governor of West Jersey

3rd Deputy Governor of West New Jersey
- In office 1684–1692
- Governor: Edward Byllynge, Dr. Daniel Coxe
- Preceded by: Thomas Olive
- Succeeded by: Vacant

Personal details
- Born: c1649 Newtyle, Aberdeenshire, Scotland
- Died: c1695 Burlington County, West New Jersey
- Spouse: Helen Fullerton
- Children: Alexander, Katherin, Lilias, Christian, Matthew
- Parent(s): Lilias Skene, Alexander Skene

John Skene was the third deputy governor of West Jersey, part of the American Province of New Jersey, serving from October 1684 to April 1692.

== Biography ==
Skene was born in Newtyle, Aberdeenshire, Scotland, the eldest surviving son of Lilias Skene née Gillespie and Alexander Skene, a merchant. In 1659 he was admitted as a burgess in Aberdeen. A Quaker, he left Scotland when his business failed and settled in West New Jersey where he purchased a 500-acre plantation he called Peachfield.

John Skene was a Freemason, having been a member of Aberdeen Lodge No. 1 in Scotland, and is cited as the first Freemason to settle in the New World.

John Skene was a member of the West Jersey General Free Assembly representing the Second Tenth in 1683, and was chosen by the Assembly to serve as a member of the West New Jersey Provincial Council, members at the time being able to serve in both houses.

In October 1684 he was appointed by Governor Edward Byllynge as deputy governor, ousting Thomas Olive, the Assembly Speaker, who had been chosen by the lower house to serve concurrently as both speaker and governor; Byllynge considered this an illegal usurpation of his power.

Skene remained deputy governor until Byllynge's death in January 1687; he was continued in office by Byllynge's successor Daniel Coxe, and succeeded by Gov. Andrew Hamilton in April 1692.
