= Thomas Olive =

American politician

2nd Deputy Governor of West New Jersey
- In office March 1684 – October 1684
- Governor: Edward Byllynge
- Preceded by: Samuel Jennings
- Succeeded by: John Skene

Personal details
- Born: c1635/1636 Wellingborough, Northamptonshire
- Died: c1692 Wellingborough, West Jersey
- Spouse: Mary Wills
- Children: Anne
- Occupation: Haberdasher

Thomas Olive was a deputy-governor of West Jersey from 1684–1685.

The original name of Wellingborough for present-day Willingboro Township, New Jersey was after the community in England which was the home of Olive. Olive was the one who led the original settlers into that township.

In 1676, along with the other proprietors of West Jersey, Olive signed the Concession and Agreement. Olive owned one share of West Jersey land as a proprietor.

== See also ==
- List of governors of New Jersey
