= John Skene =

John Skene may refer to:

- John Skene (New Jersey official), Deputy Governor of the West Jersey colony
- John Skene, Lord Curriehill (c.1543–1617), Scottish prosecutor, ambassador, and judge who prosecuted witches
