= William Bates =

William Bates may refer to:

- William Bates, Australian Aboriginal man who is said to have originated the phrase "Always was, always will be [Aboriginal land]" in the 1980s
- William Bates (minister) (1625–1699), English Presbyterian minister
- William Bates (Quaker) (died 1700), founder of Newton Colony, the third English settlement in West New Jersey
- William Bates (classicist) (1821–1884), professor of classics in Queen's College, Birmingham; editor of Maclise's Gallery.
- William Bates (Australian politician) (1825–1891), Australian politician in colonial Victoria
- William Bates (cricketer) (1884–1957), English cricketer
- William Bates (physician) (1860–1931), American physician
- William Gelston Bates (1803–1880), Massachusetts state legislator
- William H. Bates (1917–1969), American politician
  - USS William H. Bates, a Sturgeon-class attack submarine
- Houston Bates (William Houston Bates, born 1991), American football linebacker
- Bill Bates (born 1961), American football player
- William Penn Bates (1879–1956), American football player and coach
- William Bates (Emmerdale), fictional character on ITV soap opera Emmerdale

== See also ==
- Billy Bates (disambiguation)
- William Bate (disambiguation)
