= Governor Jennings =

Governor Jennings may refer to:

- Jonathan Jennings (1784–1834), 1st Governor of Indiana
- Samuel Jennings (died 1708), 1st Deputy Governor of West New Jersey from 1682 to 1685, popularly elected as Governor but usurped from that office
- William Sherman Jennings (1863–1920), 18th Governor of Florida

== See also ==
- Edmund Jenings, Colonial Governor of Virginia from 1706 to 1708
