= Samuel Jennings =

American politician (died 1708)

1st Deputy Governor of West New Jersey
- In office 1682–1685
- Governor: Edward Byllynge
- Preceded by: Office created
- Succeeded by: Thomas Olive

Speaker of the West New Jersey General Free assembly
- In office 1701–1701
- Governor: Andrew Hamilton

Member of the New Jersey Provincial Council for the Western Division
- In office July 29, 1703 – 1706 (Resigned)
- Preceded by: Office created
- Succeeded by: Peter Sonmans

Speaker of the New Jersey General Assembly
- In office 1707–1708
- Governor: Viscount Cornbury
- Preceded by: Peter Fretwell
- Succeeded by: Thomas Gordon

Member of the New Jersey General Assembly from the City of Burlington district
- In office 1707–1708 Serving with Thomas Gardiner
- Preceded by: Peter Fretwell
- Succeeded by: Thomas Rapier

Personal details
- Born: England
- Died: 1708 Burlington, New Jersey

Samuel Jennings or Samuel Jenings was born in England and died in Burlington, New Jersey, in 1708.

Jennings and his family arrived in West Jersey in September 1680. Governor Edward Byllynge in 1682 appointed Jennings to the position of deputy-governor of West Jersey. At the instigation of William Penn, Jennings allowed himself to be popularly elected as governor, causing a falling-out with Byllynge, who believed this to be an illegal usurpation of his authority. In 1684, Byllynge removed him from his position as deputy.

Jennings later became involved in the controversy started by George Keith and Thomas Budd, siding with the Quakers. As a result, he was tried and convicted. In 1694, Jennings was sent to London for his six-day trial. He ably defended his position, and published The Case Stated while in London.

After the late 1690s the government of East and West Jersey became increasingly dysfunctional. This ultimately resulted in the surrender by the Proprietors of West Jersey and those of East Jersey of the right of government to Queen Anne. Anne's government united the two colonies as the Province of New Jersey, a royal colony, establishing a new system of government. This reorganization and the period leading up to it saw many New Jersey politicians jockeying for power and influence in the new government. By 1701 he was the Speaker of the West New Jersey General Free Assembly, and was being recommended as a potential member of the New Jersey Provincial Council for the Western Division; he was appointed by The Crown on July 29, 1703. He remained on the council until his resignation in 1706.

After leaving the council, Jennings was elected to the New Jersey General Assembly for the City of Burlington, and served as Speaker during 1707. He died in 1708.

== In popular culture ==
In July 1682, he was visiting Great Island, New Hampshire where he was a witness to the Lithobolia, or stone-throwing devil.

== See also ==
- List of governors of New Jersey
