= Lilias Skene =

Scottish Quaker preacher, prophet and poet

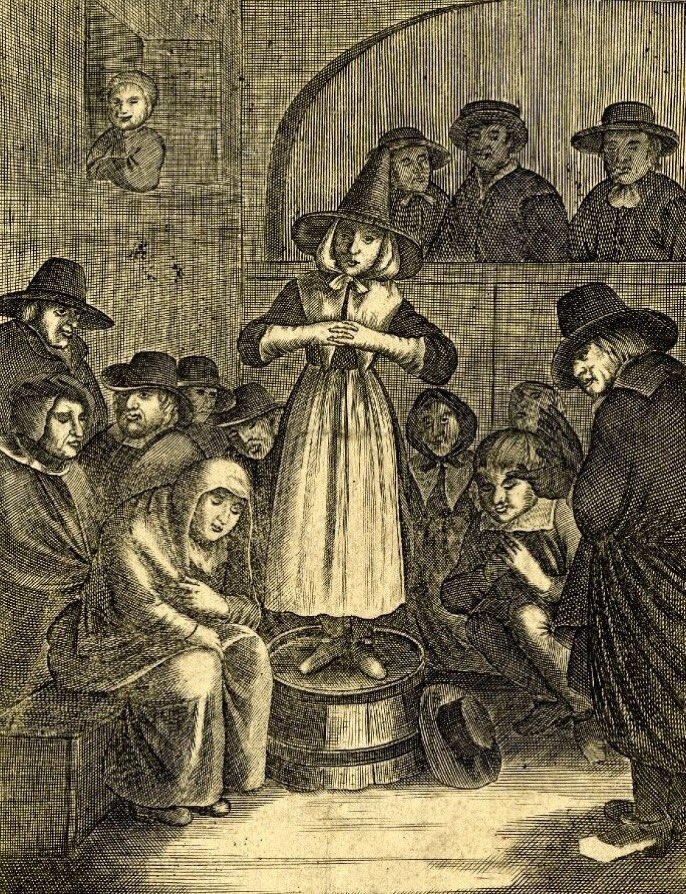
'Lilias Skene excoriates the magistrates of Aberdeen for the inhuman treatment of her fellows' (1677)

Lilias Skene or Lilias Skein (1626 – 21 June 1697) was a Scottish Quaker preacher, prophet and poet.

== Early life ==
She was born in 1626 as Lilias Gillespie, one of eight children born to Lilias née Simson, the daughter of Patrick Simson, the minister of Stirling, and John Gillespie (d. 1627), the minister of Kirkcaldy. Her father's date of death is uncertain, being either around the time of Skene's birth or just after her marriage in 1646. Her brothers included the Church of Scotland ministers Patrick Gillespie, Principal of the University of Glasgow, and George Gillespie, a member of the Westminster Assembly.

== Marriage and Conversion ==
On 26 August 1646 at Kirkcaldy she married the Aberdeen merchant Alexander Skene (c. 1621–1694), a magistrate and the author of Memorialls for the Government of the Royall-Burghs in Scotland. From 1649 to 1671 he held various offices in Aberdeen, including Treasurer of the Town Council, Dean of Guild, Baillie and a leading man in the church courts. Moving to Aberdeen to live with her husband, between 1647 and 1669 the couple had ten children, their oldest surviving son being John Skene (c. 1649–1690) who was to become Deputy Governor of West Jersey from 1684 to 1687. Skene and her husband were avowed Covenanters (a 17th-century Scottish religious and political movement, who supported a Presbyterian Church of Scotland) who were admired for their deep faith at a time when their strict Presbyterianism was out of favour following the Restoration. In 1669 Skene suddenly converted to Quakerism, with her husband joining her in 1672. Of this time she wrote, 'It is very well known to all that lived in the place where I sojourned, I was none who conversed with them, I was never at one of their meetings, I never read one of their books', yet she experienced 'that thing the school-men call Immediat Objective Revelation'. While the citizens of Aberdeen knew her as Lilias Gillespie, among the Quaker community she was known by her husband's surname.

The Quaker community in Aberdeen was small but became increasingly influential, having Robert Barclay and George Keith in its congregation and Skene was the leading female figure in it, having a position equal to the men when dealing with disciplinary matters, while religious meetings were often held in the Skenes' home. In about 1678 Skene was involved in setting up the first Quaker school in Scotland. Her leadership was much in evidence during the years of persecution of the Quaker community between 1676 and 1679 when every male Quaker in Aberdeen, almost 30 in number including her husband, oldest son and son-in-law, were imprisoned for months or years. The women of the community were not imprisoned and were free to meet and petition for the release of their menfolk. Her searing letter of 31 March 1677 entitled 'Word of Warning to the Magistrates and Inhabitants of Aberdeen' publicly took to task the Magistrates, the ministers and the people of Aberdeen and was published in the local newspapers. In the letter she mentioned her own preaching 'at severall seasons and in diverse maners I have witnessed' while also condemning the imprisoning of 'honest men that have families wives and children ... in those cold nasty stinking holes where ye have shutt them up, who have been as neatly handled and tenderly educated and as usefull in their generation as any amongst you'. It is likely that in the 1680s she helped her husband write his two manuscript accounts of the history of Quakerism in Aberdeen.

== Influence ==
In 1676 Robert Barclay persuaded Skene to write to Elisabeth of the Palatinate (1618–1680), the Calvinist cousin of the Stuart kings, in an attempt to convert her. The Quakers hoped Elisabeth would intervene on their behalf with her royal relatives in Britain even though their attempt at evangelising her failed. Barclay introduced Skene to Elisabeth as 'a woman of great experience and tenderness of heart who through great tribulations both of body and mind hath attained the earnest of the Kingdom [but whose] husband and son-in-law are now in Prison'. Skene corresponded with the princess and her companion, Countess Anna Maria van Hoorn, and was invited to visit them at Herford Abbey in Westphalia, where Elisabeth was the Abbess. Skene's letters have not survived but are referred to in correspondence between Barclay and the Princess.

The biographer of George Keith says that Skene went with Keith, Barclay, George Fox and William Penn on their tour of the Netherlands and Germany during the summer of 1677. Similarly, Barclay wrote that Skene intended to go but Penn and Fox do not mention her in their writings about the trip, and in a letter written to Skene in 1678 Elisabeth seems to be implying that the two had not actually met, writing: 'I love your upright intention to travail (i.e. toil) in spirit for your friends, though unknown to you'. During the summer of 1677 Skene was actually in London and also found time to visit the philosopher Anne Conway at her home, Ragley Hall in Worcestershire. Conway, a recent convert to Quakerism, was bedridden and Skene befriended her and the two began a correspondence with Skene organising from Aberdeen the hiring of Quaker servants for Conway's home.

== Later life and writings ==
Skene's letters and poems are among the few writings still extant today of a 17th-century Scottish woman who was not an aristocrat. Her only known publication during her lifetime (in which the author referred to her as Lillias Skein) was 'An Expostulatory Epistle, Directed to Robert Macquare' (1678) included in one of Robert Barclay's works in 1679. Macquare (known today as Robert MacWard) was a Presbyterian dissenter whose hate-filled writings against the Quakers had previously persuaded her husband Alexander Skene to write and print a rebuttal. Lilias Skene's 'Epistle' against Macquare was balanced but to the point, commenting: 'O Robert! thy hard speeches have manifested thy own sad acknowledgement to be very true, the Holy fire is gone out with thee indeed'.

The 19th-century literary historian William Walker published selections from thirty-three lyric poems and three anagrams written by her between 1665 and 1697, 1,472 lines in total transcribed from an original manuscript in the private papers of a previous owner that are now lost, presumably accidentally burnt after the death of the owner. Lilias Skene's poetry and prose were heavy with mystical allusions and scriptural images of suffering and salvation. The Aberdeenshire poll-tax book for 1696 states that the now widowed Skene was living in modest circumstances in Aberdeen with her daughter Anna and two servants. Here she died in June 1697 aged 68 and was buried beside her husband in an unmarked grave in the Quaker burial-ground at Kingswells.

Today there is a plaque dedicated to Lilias Skene on a wall near the entrance of the Crown Street Quaker meeting house in Aberdeen in addition to an information board about her at the Tollhouse where the Quaker men were imprisoned during her lifetime.
