= William Bate =

William Bate may refer to:

- William Bates (Quaker) (died 1700), or Bate, founder of Newton Colony, the third English settlement in West New Jersey
- William Thornton Bate (1818–1857), British naval officer
- William B. Bate (1826–1905), American soldier and politician
- William Bate Hardy (1864–1934), British biologist and Fellow of the Royal Society
- William J. Bate (1934–2011), New Jersey politician and judge

== See also ==
- William Bates (disambiguation)
