= Edward Hunloke =

American politician

4th Deputy Governor of West New Jersey
- In office 1690 – March 1692
- Governor: Dr. Daniel Coxe
- Preceded by: Vacant
- Succeeded by: Vacant

Member of the New Jersey Provincial Council for the Western Division
- In office July 29, 1703 – 1702 (Died before the arrival of his commission)
- Preceded by: Office created
- Succeeded by: Daniel Coxe, Jr.

Personal details
- Born: England
- Died: c.1702 Burlington, New Jersey, U.S.
- Spouse(s): Margaret Bowman; Mrs. Mary Bassnet
- Children: Thomas, Martha, Margaret, Mary, Sarah, Edward

Edward Hunloke (d. c. 1703) was deputy governor of West Jersey between 1690 and 1692.

== Career ==
Hunloke was appointed deputy governor by absentee Governor Daniel Coxe after Sir Edmund Andros, governor of the Dominion of New England, was deposed and returned to England. Coxe had initially appointed John Tatham, but Tatham, a suspected Jacobite, was rejected by the province. Edward Hunloke held office at least until Coxe sold his interest in the province to the West Jersey Society, a group of English investors. The West Jersey Society appointed Andrew Hamilton governor, presumably superseding Hunloke.

Edward Hunloke continued to be referred to as Deputy Governor in court documents at least as late as 1694, however this appears to have been an honorific title.

After the late 1690s the government of East and West Jersey became increasingly dysfunctional. This ultimately resulted in the surrender by the Proprietors of East Jersey and those of West Jersey of the right of government to Queen Anne. Anne's government united the two colonies as the Province of New Jersey, a royal colony, establishing a new system of government. In 1703 Edward Hunloke was appointed by The Crown as a member of the New Jersey Provincial Council, however he died before his commission reached American shores.

Edward Hunloke made his will on June 4, 1702; proved August 8, 1702.

== See also ==
- List of colonial governors of New Jersey
