= Hunloke =

Hunloke is a surname. Notable people with the surname include:

- Edward Hunloke (died c. 1703), deputy governor of West Jersey
- Henry Hunloke (1906–1978), British politician
- Philip Hunloke (1868–1947), British sailor and courtier

== See also ==
- Hunloke Baronets
