= Daniel Coxe IV =

American politician

Member of the New Jersey Provincial Council for the Western Division
- In office November 29, 1705 – June 15, 1713 (Suspended)
- Preceded by: Edward Hunloke

6th Speaker of the New Jersey General Assembly
- In office 1716 – 1717 (Expelled)
- Governor: Robert Hunter
- Preceded by: John Kay
- Succeeded by: John Kinsey

Member of the New Jersey General Assembly from the Gloucester County district
- In office 1716 – 1717 (Expelled)

Personal details
- Born: 1673
- Died: 1739 (aged 65–66)
- Spouse: Sarah Eckley
- Children: Daniel, William, Rebecca, John

Colonel Daniel Coxe IV (1673–1739), son of Dr. Daniel Coxe, went to his father's North American lands. He lived in the American colonies from 1702 to 1716 and from 1725 until his death in 1739. After returning to England in 1716, he published an account in 1722 of his travels and a description of the area encompassed by his father's claim, entitled A Description of the English Province of Carolana, by the Spaniards called Florida, And by the French La Louisiane.

Daniel Coxe IV was appointed a member of the New Jersey Provincial Council on November 29, 1705, replacing the late Edward Hunloke. He was suspended from his duties on June 15, 1713 after having conflicts with Gov. Robert Hunter. In 1716 he was elected to the New Jersey General Assembly representing Gloucester County, and was chosen as Speaker, but was expelled from the lower house that same year.

He was appointed by the Duke of Norfolk as Provincial Grand Master of Freemasons of New York, New Jersey and Pennsylvania in 1730. The following year, he was succeeded by William Allen.

In 1731, he claimed that he possessed superior title to that of the West Jersey Society, via a superseding deed that his father had recorded years earlier; the courts upheld Coxe's claim. Hundreds of families were forced to repurchase their own property from Col. Coxe or be forcibly evicted. The ensuing scandal was one of many injustices that inflamed American anger against the British during the years leading up the Revolutionary War. There were lawsuits and riots; Col. Coxe was burned in effigy; but to no avail. As a result, many Hopewell residents left New Jersey, either unable to pay Col. Coxe or disgusted with the colony's rampant political corruption. One group of Hopewell expatriates settled on the Yadkin River in what was then Rowan County, North Carolina. This community, the Jersey Settlement, continued to attract new settlers from the Hopewell area for several decades.
