= Billy Bates (disambiguation) =

Billy Bates (1855–1900) was an English all-round cricketer.

Billy Bates may also refer to:

- Billy Ray Bates (born 1956), American basketball player
- Billy Bates (baseball) (born 1963), American baseball player
- Billy Bates (footballer) (1922–1997), English footballer

== See also ==
- William Bates (disambiguation)
