= Lord proprietor =

Term for a 17th-century English colony founder

A lord proprietor is a person granted a royal charter for the establishment and government of an English colony in the 17th century. The plural of the term is "lords proprietors" or "lords proprietary".

== Origin ==
In the beginning of the European colonial era, trade companies, such as the East India Company, were the most common method used to settle new land claimed by a monarch but not effectively occupied. That changed after Maryland's Royal Grant in 1632, when King Charles I granted George Calvert, 1st Baron Baltimore, proprietary rights to an area east of the Potomac River in exchange for a share of the income derived there. Proprietary colonies later became the most common way to settle areas with English subjects. The Crown licensed or granted land to a proprietor, who held expanse power. The powers were commonly written into the royal land charters by using the "Bishop of Durham clause," which recreated the powers and responsibilities once given to the County Palatine of Durham in England. That clause gave the lord proprietor the power to create courts and laws, establish governing bodies and churches, and appoint all governing officials.

== Governance of proprietary colonies ==
Each proprietary colony had a unique system of governance reflecting the geographic challenges of the area as well as the personality of the lord proprietor. The colonies of Maryland and New York, based on English law and administration practices, were run effectively. However, other colonies such as Carolina were mismanaged. The colonies of West and East Jersey, as well as Pennsylvania, were distinct in their diversion from the traditional monarchial system, which ruled most colonies of the time because of the large number of Quakers in those areas who shared many views with the lords proprietary.

Effective governance of proprietary colonies relied on the appointment of a governor. The lord proprietor made the governor the head of the province's military, judicial, and administrative functions. This was typically conducted using a commission established by the lord proprietor. The lord proprietor typically instructed the governor what to do. Only through those instructions could legislation be made.

== Carolina ==
In 1629, King Charles I granted Sir Robert Heath (the attorney general) the southern half of the English land in the New World between 36 degrees and 31 degrees north latitude from the Atlantic Ocean to the Pacific Ocean. The land was named "Province of Carolina" or land of Charles. Sir Robert's attempts at settlement failed and in 1645, during the English Civil War, he was stripped of all of his possessions as a Royalist supporter of the King. In 1663, eight members of the English nobility received a charter from King Charles II to establish the colony of Carolina. The eight Lords Proprietors were:

- Duke of Albemarle (1608–1670)
- Earl of Clarendon (1609–1674)
- Baron Berkeley of Stratton (1602–1678)
- Earl of Craven (1608–1697)
- Sir George Carteret (c. 1610–1680)
- Sir William Berkeley (1605–1677)
- Sir John Colleton (1608–1666)
- Earl of Shaftesbury (1621–1683).

The Lords Proprietors were anxious to secure Carolina against Spanish attacks from San Agustín in Florida, and to do so, they needed to attract more colonists. The Lords Proprietors offered English settlers inducements consisting of religious toleration, political representation in an assembly that had power over public taxes, exemption from quitrents, and large grants of land. The Lords allowed settlers of any religion except atheists. The Lords also had a generous headright system whereby they granted 150 acres of land to each member of a family. An indentured male servant who served his term received his freedom dues from his master and a grant of one hundred acres from the Lords Proprietors. To attract planters with capital to invest, the Lords Proprietors also gave the owner and master the 150-acre headright for every slave imported to the Colony. These incentives drew 6,600 colonists to the colony by 1700 compared with only 1,500 in the Spanish colony of Florida. Carolina attracted English settlers, French Protestants (Huguenots) and other colonists from Barbados and the West Indies.

The first government in Carolina began in Albemarle County in 1664, when William Sayle was appointed as the governor. Proprietary authority was weaker near the Virginia border. The Lords Proprietors established a North Carolina with its own assembly and deputy governor. In 1712, the division of Carolina into North and South was completed with the elevation of the deputy governor to governor of North Carolina.

The Lords Proprietors failed to protect the settlers when enemies attacked or threatened the colony. For example, during Queen Anne's War (1702–1713), the colonists drove French and Spanish forces away from Charlestown. Again, between 1715 and 1718, the colonists defended themselves against attacks by the Yamasee Indians and pirates. During these times of conflict, the colonists received little or no help from the proprietors. The elite group of settlers in Carolina, former West Indians known as the Goose Creek Men, grew increasingly frustrated with the Lords Proprietors because they meddled in politics but failed to defend the colony against Spanish and Native American attacks.

In 1719, the South Carolina assembly sent a petition to England and requested the proprietors to be replaced with Crown administration. King George I appointed royal governors for North and South Carolina and converted the colony's status to that of a royal colony (Britain ruled the colony but allowed the people self-government). In 1729, the Crown bought out seven of the eight of the Lords Proprietors for £22,500, approximately the amount that they had spent on the colony. The eighth proprietor, John Carteret, Lord Granville, refused to sell and retained title to the lands and quitrents in the northern third of North Carolina.

When the Crown purchased the proprietors' interests in 1729 the successors of the eight proprietors proved to be:

- Albemarle: in trust for Henry Somerset, 3rd Duke of Beaufort (1707–1745) and his brother, then Lord Charles Somerset (1709–1756)
- Clarendon: James Bertie (1674–1735)
- Berkeley: Joseph Blake, a planter of the province of South Carolina (1700–1751)
- Craven: William Craven, 3rd Baron Craven (1700–1739)
- Carteret: John Carteret, Baron Carteret (1690–1763), governor of the kingdom of Ireland, who retained his interest
- William Berkeley: Henry Bertie (1675–1735) and Mary Danson, widow, of St Andrews Holborn, and Elizabeth Moor, widow, of London
- Colleton: Sir John Colleton, 3rd Baronet of Exmouth, Devon (1669–1754)
- Shaftesbury: in trust for John Cotton of East Barnet, Middlesex

Some of the 1729 interests had been acquired not by inheritance but by purchase. The Carteret interest continued until independence, when the Crown paid compensation for the Carteret loss.

=== Documents ===
Two documents remain with the Lords Proprietors' original seal kept intact.

In the 1690s, the Lords Proprietors were keen to implement their plan for a colonial aristocracy (an attempt to stabilize Carolina politics). One document is a grant or patent issued by the Lords Proprietors of South Carolina in 1699. It was issued to an Englishman named John Wyche, a relative of the chief Proprietor, giving him the status of Landgrave with the right to claim 48,000 acres (190 km^{2}) of land in a certain region. John Wyche was appointed as the Secretary to the Province and served in this role in the colony for a short period of six months before he received another appointment in Hamburg. Some of the documents relate to Wyche's activity in the colony. His successor to the Secretary position was John Wilmot. After a revolt against the Lords Proprietors in 1719, the colony came under royal control. This change in power was formalized by an Act of the English parliament in 1729 called "An Agreement with Seven of the Lords Proprietors of Carolina, for the Surrender of their Title and Interest in that Province".

The documents include information about Wyche's land-claims and the petition of the Cyril family for an endorsement of their rights under the 1699 grant (a claim that the Privy Council in London disallowed). The grant was originally written in Latin and is embossed on vellum with the Great Seal of the Proprietors attached. This seal and document is one of two such 17th century documents to survive with the seal intact.

1. Sir Robert Heath's Patent 5 Charles I, 30 October 1629

In this patent King Charles I of England gave Sir Robert Hearth, the attorney general, property in the New World.

2. A Declaration and Proposals of the Lord Proprietor of Carolina, 25 August – 4 September 1663

This charter issued by King Charles II of England proposed the formation of the Lords Proprietors and gave the lands of Carolina to the eight proprietors: the Earl of Clarendon, Duke of Albemarle, Lord Craven, Lord Berkeley, Lord Ashley, Sir George Carteret, William Berkeley and Sir John Colleton. This declaration gave the proprietors the power to protect their colony, the right to settle the colony, freedom of religion and one hundred acres of land for each man.

3. Charter of Carolina- 24 March 1663

This charter outlined how the eight proprietors should rule Carolina. It gave the land to the proprietors, allowed for patronage, gave the proprietors absolute power in the colony, gave the colony's government the right to make laws, authorized the authority to make ordinances, gave instructions to defend the colony against enemies, outlined trade regulations, gave the proprietors building rights in the colony, allowed for an army and allowed the practice of religion conformed to the Church of England.

4. The Concession and Agreement of the Lords Proprietors of the province of New Caesarea, or New Jersey, to and With All and Every the Adventures and All Such as Shall Settle or Plant There- 1664

This document outlines the distribution of power in New Jersey by the Lords Proprietors. The document includes the role Governor of the province, the right for the Governor to choose six counsellors, the role of the Chief of Secretary, the role of the Surveyor General and the colonists’ duty as subjects of the King of England.

5. A Declaration of the True Intent and Meaning of us the Lords Proprietors, and Explanation of There Concessions Made to the Adventures and Planters of New Caesarea or New Jersey- 1672

This declaration outlines the rules for the General Assembly and the Governor.

6. His Royal Highness's Grant to the Lords Proprietors, Sir George Carteret, 29 July 1674

This document from King Charles II of England reiterates Sir George Carteret's claim to his land in America as laid out by the original patents.

Definition

Headright system- Each settler received a single headright (grant of land) for himself or herself.

Quitrents- a fixed rent payable to a feudal superior in commutation of services

== New Jersey ==
In 1664, the English gained control of New Jersey from the Dutch. King Charles II granted the country to his brother, the Duke of York, who in turn sold the colony to two of his friends, Lord Berkeley and Sir George Carteret (who were both already Lords Proprietors of Carolina). The area was named "New Jersey" after Carteret's home island of Jersey in the English Channel. The grant, unique among other proprietary grants in the Americas, did not explicitly give the lord proprietors the power of government in the colony.

Nonetheless, Berkeley and Carteret, established a constitution and gave freemen the right to elect an Assembly. A tax could not be levied without the Assembly's approval. The Governor was appointed by the Lords Proprietors and was allowed to select his own Council, which constituted the upper branch of the Legislature. The new colony attracted many settlers because Berkeley and Sir George Carteret sold the land to the colonists at low prices and allowed them political and religious freedoms.

The Dutch re-conquered the area in 1673 but then surrendered to the English in 1674. The new documents governing the lands still did not mention the lord proprietor's governing rights which led to continued confusion with colonial officials in New York. Two of New Jersey's governors during the area's time as a proprietary colony were arrested and imprisoned in New York for governing without the authority to do so.

Berkeley sold his half of New Jersey to Edward Byllynge and John Fenwick. In 1676, Carteret and Fenwick negotiated a division of the province into two sections: East Jersey which was held by Carteret and West Jersey which was held by Fenwick. Sir George Carteret died in 1680. His property was left to Trustees who put East Jersey up for sale in a public auction. In 1682, the property was sold to William Penn and eleven associates who each sold half of their share to twelve others, forming an association of twenty-four proprietors. This body became known as the Board of Proprietors of East Jersey. This board exercised government control, which eventually led to many conflicts within the colony. In 1702, East and West Jersey surrendered the right to government to the English Crown under Queen Anne following the Glorious Revolution.

In the Province of New Jersey, there were two proprietary lordships:

Lords Proprietary of East Jersey:

- August 1665–14 January 1680: Sir George Carteret (c. 1610–1680)
- January 1680 – 1682 : 8 Proprietors
- 1682–1688 : 24 Proprietors (1st time)
- 1692–April 1703: 24 Proprietors (2nd time)

Lords Proprietary of West Jersey:

- August 1665–18 March 1674: John Berkeley, 1st Baron Berkeley of Stratton (1602–1678)
- 18 March 1674–February 1675: Edward Byllynge (1st time) (died 1687) jointly with John Fenwick (1618–1683)
- February 1675–September 1683: Trusteeship
- September 1683 – 1687: Edward Byllynge (2nd time) (s.a.)
- February 1687 – 1688: Daniel Coxe (c. 1640–1730)
- 1692–April 1703: 12 Proprietors

== Lord of Mann ==
The British monarch, in his or her capacity as Sovereign Lord of Mann, is considered to be the Lord Proprietor of the Isle of Man. This usage is generally ignored.

== See also ==
- Donatário (Portuguese Empire)
- Hereditary title
- List of Proprietors of Maryland
- Proprietary colony

== Sources ==
- Stiles, T. J., ed. (1998). "Chapter 16: Proprietors in the Colonies". The Colonizers. In their own words (1st ed.). New York: Perigee Books. pp. 296–311. ISBN 0-399-52390-1. LCCN 97041889.
