= William Bates (Quaker) =

- Died: 8 November 1700; Newton Colony, Camden County, New Jersey
- Occupation: Carpenter
- Children: Jeremiah; Joseph; Abigail; William; Sarah

William Bates, or William Bate, (died 8 November 1700) and other Quakers emigrated from Ireland to Gloucester County (now Camden County), New Jersey where in 1682 they established Newton Colony, the third English settlement in West Jersey. William Bates was the first English-speaking settler of present-day Oaklyn, New Jersey.

== Ireland ==
In 1670, William Bates was a resident of County Wicklow, Ireland where he raised a family, including five children: Jeremiah, Joseph, Abigail, William, and Sarah. Bates attended Quaker religious services which were held in the town of Wicklow.

Prior to 1674, West Jersey had been partitioned into five territories, each called a Tenth. The five Tenths, stretching from Assunpink Creek southward to an area inclusive of the Cohansey River, fronted the Delaware River to the west. On 12 April 1677, title to the Third Tenth was conveyed to a group of Irish Quakers, or Proprietors. The Third Tenth ran from Pennsauken Creek to Big Timber Creek. In deference to the Proprietors and the original settlers, the Third Tenth was called the Irish Tenth. From the Irish Proprietors William Bates, carpenter, of the county of Wickloe, and four Dubliners: Joseph Slight, Thomas Thackara, Robert Turner and Robert Zane each received a right to acreage. The amount of acreage was specified but the precise location would be selected by its owner upon arrival and subject to a survey.

== Irish Tenth ==
On 19 September 1681, William Bates and a small group of emigrants, including George Goldsmith, Mark Newbie, Thomas Sharp and Thomas Thackera, departed Dublin aboard Ye Owners Adventure, Thomas Lurtin in command. After reaching the Delaware Capes on 18 November, the voyagers made their final landing at Salem. Here they spent the winter in Fenwick's Colony, a fledgling settlement established in 1675 at Salem by a group of English Quakers under the leadership of John Fenwick.

That winter, the five proprietors were joined by Robert Zane, who had been living in Fenwick's Colony since its founding, during a trip up the Delaware River to the Irish Tenth. They focused their attention on the western part of the territory: The portion that was bounded by the east bank of the Delaware River, the south bank of Pennsauken Creek to the north, and the north bank of Big Timber Creek to the south. They all chose to exercise their rights by claiming land fronting the middle branch of Newton Creek, a tributary of the Delaware that formed three branches. William Bates claimed 250 acres fronting the south bank in present-day Oaklyn. The others claimed five contiguous properties, totaling 1600 acres, fronting the north bank in present-day Collingswood.

== Newton Colony ==
All of the children of William Bates married after they had emigrated to Newton Colony: Jeremiah wed Mary Spicer; Joseph married Mercy Clement in 1701; Abigail wed Joseph Fearne in 1687; William reportedly married a Native American woman, Esther Albertson; and Sarah wed Simeon Ellis in 1692.
