= Daniel Coxe =

2nd and 3rd Governor of West New Jersey
- In office 1687–1688
- Deputy: John Skene; Edward Hunloke
- Preceded by: Edward Byllynge
- Succeeded by: Edmund Andros (Dominion of New England)
- In office April 1689 – March 1692
- Deputy: John Skene
- Preceded by: Edmund Andros (Dominion of New England)
- Succeeded by: Andrew Hamilton

Personal details
- Born: c.1640 England
- Died: 19 January 1730 London, England
- Spouse: Rebecca Coldham
- Children: Daniel, Mary
- Education: Jesus College, Cambridge
- Profession: Physician

Daniel Coxe III (c. 1640 – 19 January 1730) FRS was an English physician and governor of West Jersey from 1687 to 1688 and 1689 to 1692.

== Biography ==
The Coxe family traced their lineage to a Daniel Coxe who lived in Somersetshire, England, in the 13th century and obtained a doctor of medicine degree from Salerno University. Daniel Coxe's father was also called Daniel Coxe. He was from Stoke Newington, London, and died in 1686.

Daniel Coxe the son was born in London, the oldest of thirteen children, and was educated at Jesus College, Cambridge, where he became a doctor of medicine in 1669. He was a Fellow of the Royal Society and a member of the Royal College of Physicians (Coxe is the Society member referred to by Samuel Pepys in his diary entry of 3 May 1665 when he poisons a cat with tobacco oil at Gresham College). Coxe was appointed a physician to the court of King Charles II of England and later to that of Queen Anne.

== Colonial landowner ==
Coxe never left England, he served nominally as Governor of New Jersey by purchase of land. He then bought other land in the Mississippi Valley. He attempted to settle a colony of Huguenots in Virginia, but failed.

Initially Coxe purchased land in West Jersey in the mid-1680s. He bought out the heirs of Edward Byllynge there in 1687. Coxe opened the earliest commercial-scale pottery in New Jersey. He sold out most of his land there to the West New Jersey Society of London, in 1692.

Later in the 1690s Coxe acquired a grant of land in 1698 known as "Carolana" which had been given by Charles I to Sir Robert Heath; this he purchased from Sir James Shaen, or his son Arthur; Shaen had acquired the rights from Henry Howard, 6th Duke of Norfolk. The Carolana holding remained with the Coxe family until 1769 when it was exchanged for land in the Mohawk valley of what is now New York state.

== Later life ==
Coxe died in 1730, and was buried in London, England. His portrait is held by the Royal College of Physicians in London.

== Family ==
Coxe married Rebecca Coldham (only surviving child and heiress of John Coldham, Esquire of Tooting Graveney, Alderman of London and Rebecca Wood) on 12 May 1671. They had a son Colonel Daniel Coxe and a daughter Mary.

Daniel Coxe IV (1673–1739), with an agent John Tatham, went to his father's North American lands. He lived in the American colonies from 1702 to 1716 and after returning to England published an account in 1722 of his travels and a description of the area encompassed by his father's claim, entitled A Description of the English Province of Carolana, by the Spaniards called Florida, And by the French La Louisiane. He was appointed by the Duke of Norfolk as Provincial Grand Master of Freemasons for the provinces of New York, New Jersey and Pennsylvania, but died before he had chartered any lodges. In 1731, he claimed that he possessed superior title to that of the West Jersey Society, via a superseding deed that his father had recorded years earlier; the courts upheld Coxe's claim. Hundreds of families were forced to repurchase their own property from Col. Coxe or be forcibly evicted. The ensuing scandal was one of many injustices that inflamed American anger against the British during the years leading up the Revolutionary War. There were lawsuits; there were riots; Col. Coxe was burned in effigy; but to no avail. As a result, many Hopewell residents left New Jersey, either unable to pay Col. Coxe or disgusted with the colony's rampant political corruption. One group of Hopewell expatriates settled on the Yadkin River in what was then Rowan County, NC. This community, the Jersey Settlement, continued to attract new settlers from the Hopewell area for several decades.

Mary became a Maid of Honour to Queen Caroline, the wife of King George II and later married John Montgomery (died 1733) in 1732 and had a son Alexander, who were both M.P.'s for County Monaghan in Ireland. After Col. John Montgomery's death she married William Clement LL.D. Vice Provost of Trinity College, Dublin and M.P. both for the college and the City of Dublin. She died at Beaulieu, Co. Louth in 1790 aged 97 years.

== See also ==
- Alexander Montgomery (died 1785)
- List of governors of New Jersey

== Sources ==
- New Jersey

Government offices
| Preceded by Edward Byllynge | Governor of West Jersey; 1687 – 1688 | Succeeded by Edmund Andros |
