= Newton Colony, New Jersey =

Coordinates: 39.9305°N 75.0864°W

Newton Colony was the third English settlement in West Jersey. Newton Colony was founded in 1682 by a group of Quakers, who had emigrated from Ireland, on the banks of Newton Creek, a tributary of the Delaware River, in present-day Camden County, New Jersey. The founders of Newton Colony were William Bates, George Goldsmith, Mark Newbie, Thomas Sharp, Thomas Thackara and Robert Zane. The original Newton Colony occupied most of the present day municipalities of Oaklyn and Collingswood, New Jersey. The original colony grew to occupy a portion of the present day municipalities of Camden, Haddon Township, Pennsauken Township, and Haddonfield.
