= Edward Byllynge =

British governor of West New Jersey from 1680 to 1687

1st Governor of West New Jersey
- In office August 1680 – January 1687
- Deputy: Samuel Jennings; Thomas Olive; John Skene
- Preceded by: Office created
- Succeeded by: Daniel Coxe

Personal details
- Born: Hengar, St Tudy, Cornwall
- Died: January 1687 England
- Occupation: Brewer

Edward Byllynge was an English colonial administrator and governor of West New Jersey from 1680 to 1687, until his death in England. Byllynge owned a large section of land in New Jersey with the Quakers.

Byllynge was a London brewer. He purchased land in New Jersey in 1674 from Sir John Berkeley, in deal also involving John Fenwick. Byllynge's financial position was complicated by bankruptcy, and after negotiations involving William Penn, the purchase in 1675 was reassigned to a trust involving Fenwick, Penn and others with Byllynge. The planting of Quaker colonies then proceeded.

Byllynge was an unpopular governor with the settlers of New Jersey. He never even set foot on the tract of land he owned. In 1682, Byllynge was one of the 24 proprietaries who owned a piece of West New Jersey.

Government offices
| Preceded by none | Governor of West Jersey; 1680 – 1687 | Succeeded by Daniel Coxe |
