= John Fenwick (Quaker) =

Quaker emigrant leader

- Born: 1618; Stanton Manor, Northumberland, England
- Died: 1683; Fenwick's Colony, Salem County, New Jersey, British America
- Occupation(s): Soldier, attorney
- Spouses: Elizabeth Covert; Mary Burdet
- Children: Elizabeth; Anne; Priscilla
- Parent(s): Sir William Fenwick; Elizabeth

John Fenwick (1618—1683) was the leader of a group of Quakers who emigrated in 1675 from England to Salem, New Jersey where they established Fenwick's Colony, the first English settlement in West Jersey.

== Personal life in England ==
Fenwick was born the second son of Sir William Fenwick at Stanton Manor, Northumberland, England to an ancient family of wealth and influence. In 1648, John Fenwick married Elizabeth Covert, who gave birth to three daughters: Elizabeth, Anne and Priscilla. In 1665, John and Elizabeth Fenwick joined the Religious Society of Friends, or Quakers. After Elizabeth's death, John Fenwick married Mary Burdet, his second wife and daughter of Sir Walter Burdet. They had no children.

== Fenwick's Colony ==
Prior to 1674, West Jersey had been partitioned by English colonists into five territories, each called a Tenth. The five Tenths, stretching from Assunpink Creek southward to an area inclusive of the Cohansey River, fronted the east bank of the Delaware River. John Fenwick acquired title to the Fifth Tenth, which occupied much of the present-day counties of Salem and Cumberland.

In the third quarter of 1675, John Fenwick and the other emigrants departed London aboard the Griffin, Robert Griffith in command. The Griffin reached its destination prior to October 8, 1675; that day John Fenwick recorded a land deed with the local Lenape Indian tribe. Fenwick gave his new home the name of New Salem, meaning peace.
