= West Jersey =

English possession in North America (1674–1702)

Coordinates: 40.166°N 74.234°W

Province of West Jersey
- 1674–1702
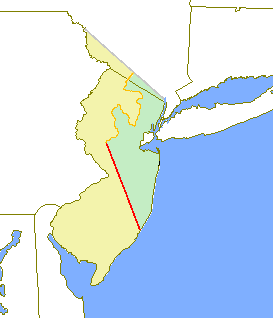
- The original provinces of West and East Jersey are shown in yellow and green respectively. The Keith Line is shown in red, and the Coxe–Barclay Line is shown in orange.
- Status: Colony of England
- Capital: Burlington
- Common languages: English
- Government: Proprietary colony
- Lords Proprietor
  - 1674: Edward Byllynge; John Fenwick
- Governor
  - 1680-1687: Edward Byllynge (first)
  - 1699-1702: Andrew Hamilton (last)
- History
  - Established: 1674
  - Disestablished: 1702
- Currency: Pound sterling
Preceded by	Succeeded by
Province of New Jersey	Province of New Jersey; Dominion of New England
- Today part of: United States: New Jersey

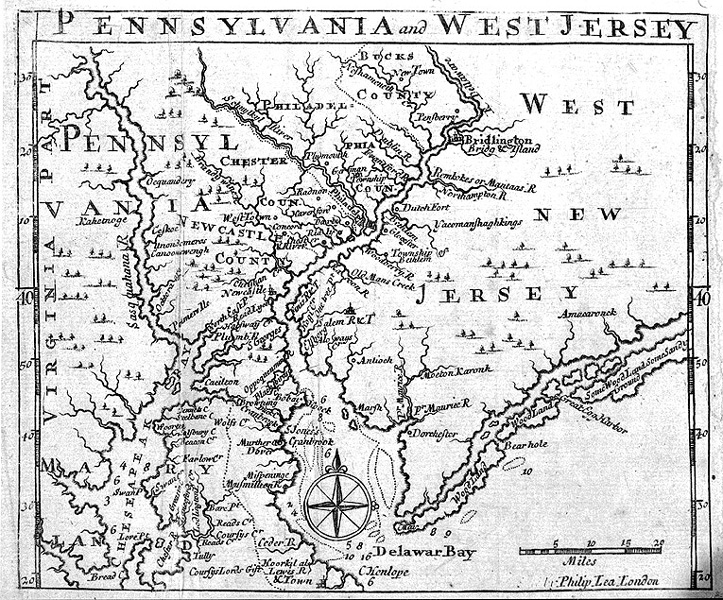
1698 map showing West Jersey and Pennsylvania

West Jersey and East Jersey were two distinct parts of the Province of New Jersey. The political division existed for 28 years, between 1674 and 1702. Determination of an exact location for a border between West Jersey and East Jersey was often a matter of dispute.

== Background ==
The Delaware Valley had been inhabited by the Lenape (or Delaware) Indians prior to European exploration and settlement starting around 1609, undertaken by the Dutch, Swedish and English. The Dutch West India Company had established one or two Delaware River settlements, but by the late 1620s, it had moved most of its inhabitants to the island of Manhattan. This became the center of New Netherland. West Jersey and East Jersey were two sections of New Jersey.

The development of the colony of New Sweden in the lower Delaware Valley began in 1638. Most of the Swedish population was on the west side of the Delaware. After the English re-established New Netherland's Fort Nassau to challenge the Swedes, the latter constructed Fort Nya Elfsborg in present-day Salem County. Fort Nya Elfsborg was located between present day Salem and Alloway Creek. The New Sweden colony established two primary settlements in New Jersey: Sveaborg, now Swedesboro, and Nya Stockholm, now Bridgeport. Trinity Church, located in Swedesboro, was the site of the Church of Sweden for the area.

The Dutch defeated New Sweden in 1655. Settlement of the West Jersey area by Europeans was thin until the English conquest in 1664. Beginning in the late 1670s, Quakers settled in great numbers in this area, first in present-day Salem County and then in Burlington. The latter became the capital of West Jersey.

Before 1674, land surveyors for New Jersey considered it as a hundred and partitioned it into tenths. West Jersey comprised five of the tenths. But demarcation of the boundaries awaited settlement, the quit-rents the settlers would pay, and the land surveying which the money would purchase. Thus it took years and multiple surveys to settle boundary disputes. Burlington County was formed on May 17, 1694 by combining the first and second tenths. At least three surveys were conducted of West Jersey. Richard Tindall was surveyor-general of Fenwick's Colony, the fifth tenth.

Summary of boundary lines
Date	Boundary name	Description
1674	Original Duke of York Line (did not recognize John Fenwick's holdings)	Barnegat Bay to Rancocas Creek on the Delaware River just north of present-day Philadelphia.
1676	Quintipartite Deed Line (between George Carteret on the East, and William Penn, Gawen Lawrie, Nicholas Lucas, and Edward Byllynge on the West, except for 10% to John Fenwick)	On the north from a point 41° 40' latitude on the Delaware River extending southward on a straight and direct line to the east side of Little Egg-Harbor.
1687	William Emley / John Reid Adjustment (commissioners from West and East Jersey respectively)	Adjusted description on the Delaware fifty minutes more westerly due to magnetic compass variation
1687	Keith Line aka Province Line (Surveyed north only to the south branch of the Raritan River)	Stopped by Governor Daniel Coxe of West Jersey and Governor Robert Barclay of East Jersey
1688	Coxe-Barclay Line Survey	Extended the Keith Line from the Raritan River along specific properties that defined the eastern boundaries of present- day Morris and Sussex Counties and the northern border of Somerset County
1696	Thornton Line Survey	Attempted to correct errors from previous surveys
1702	East and West Jersey United	Violence became so obsessive, that East and West proprietors gave up their individual governing rights to Queen Anne
1743	Lawrence Line Survey (Land ownership disputes continued. West Jersey proprietors attempted to fund survey but failed. East Jersey Proprietors then hired John Lawrence)	Adopted by NJ supreme court in 1855 as the final arbiter of all land disputes. Today defines boundary for Walpack, Sandyston, Stillwater, Hampton, and Green Townships

== Constitution ==
See: History of the New Jersey State Constitution#West Jersey Constitution

== See also ==
- Colonial history of New Jersey
- Concession and Agreement
- Lords Proprietor (1665–1703)
- List of colonial governors of New Jersey#Governors under the Proprietors (1665–1674)
- Newton Colony
- Province of New York
- Dominion of New England
- West Jersey and Seashore Railroad
