= Little Creek-Cape Charles Ferry =

Passenger ferry service

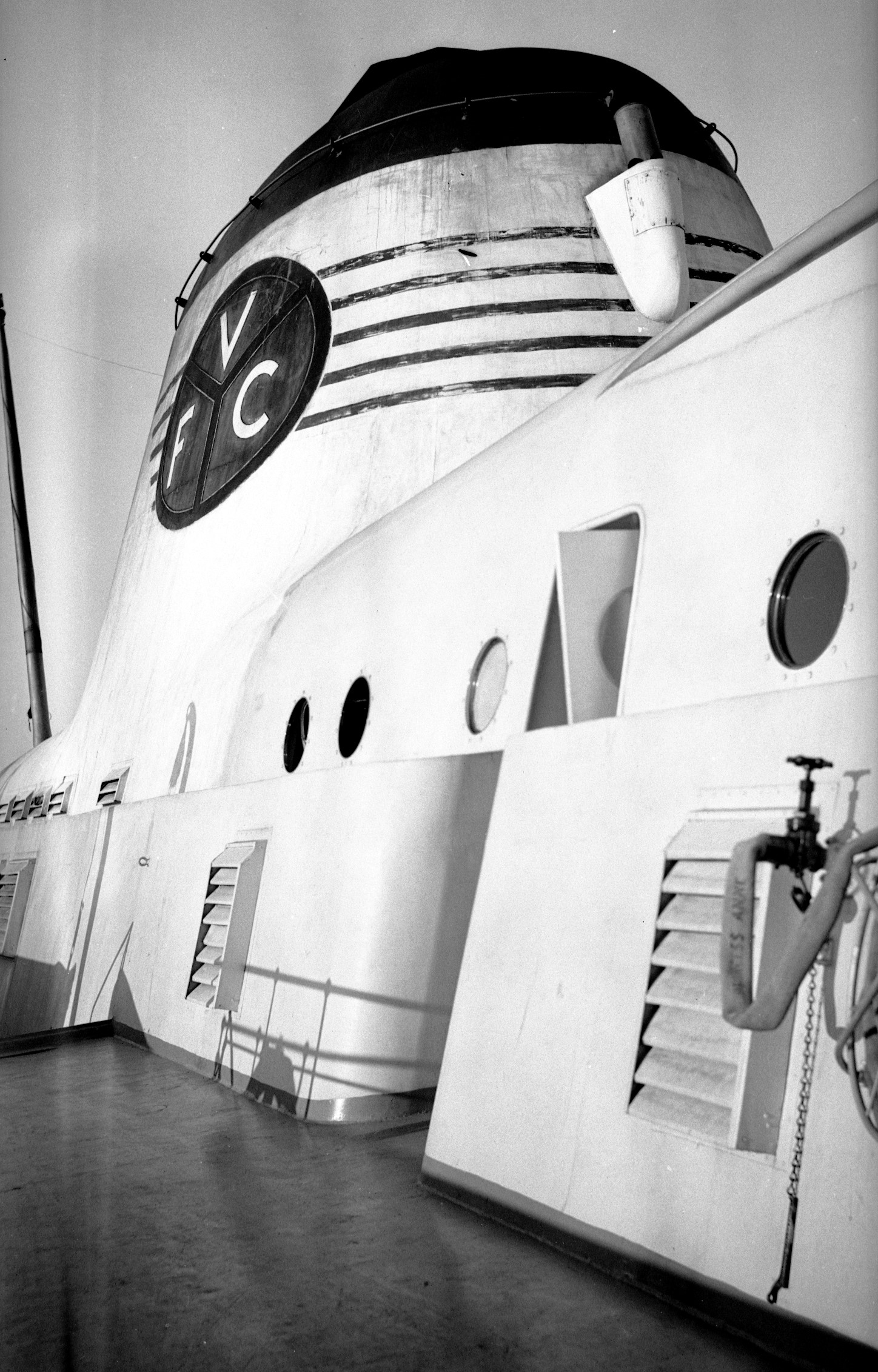
Streamlined superstructure of the SS Princess Anne (1933)

The Little Creek-Cape Charles Ferry was a passenger ferry service operating across the mouth of the Chesapeake Bay from the 1930s until 1964. Known also as the Princess Anne-Kiptopeke Beach Ferry or Little Creek-Kiptopeke Beach Ferry, the service connected Virginia Beach, Virginia (then Princess Anne County) with Cape Charles on the Eastern Shore of Virginia. Departures from and arrivals to Cape Charles were matched with times of Pennsylvania Railroad passenger trains such as the Del-Mar-Va Express and the Cavalier that operated the length of the Delmarva Peninsula.

Beginning in the 1940s the ferry began accommodating vehicles as well as passengers, with the service then linking the Ocean Highway, a major coastal route.

The service was acquired by an agency of the Commonwealth of Virginia in 1954, ceased operations in April 1964, and was replaced by the Chesapeake Bay Bridge-Tunnel. During its peak, the Little Creek Ferry operated 90 one-way trips each day with seven vessels.

The southern terminus of the ferry service in Virginia Beach (originally Princess Anne County) remains accessible today, where it continues to bisect Naval Amphibious Base Little Creek. The original northern terminus in Cape Charles also remains accessible, and these two terminals continue to serve railway barges that ferry rail cars — belonging to Bay Coast Railroad, formerly the Eastern Shore Railroad — across the mouth of the Bay.

In 1949, the northern terminus for ferry service was moved from Cape Charles to Kiptopeke where a new pier was completed in 1951 — shortening the 85 minute crossing by 20 minutes. That now defunct terminus with remnants of the original toll booth lie within Kiptopeke State Park, where a sign from the defunct Tourinns Motor Lodge remains near the former toll booth at picnic shelter #2.

- Southern Terminus
- Northern Terminus (original, Cape Charles)
- Northern Terminus (later location, Kiptopke)

== Chesapeake Bay Ferry District ==
The newly formed Virginia Ferry Corporation initiated a motor vehicle-passenger ferry service between Little Creek and Cape Charles on April 1, 1933 paralleling the existing Pennsylvania Railroad (PRR) carfloat route (operated by the PRR subsidiary, NYP&N RR Ferry) between Little Creek and Cape Charles. On May 1, 1950, the ferry route was changed from Cape Charles to the newly formed artificial Harbor at Kiptopeke Beach. The VFC was a 50/50 Wilson Line & Pennsylvania RR venture, a Virginia public service company.

The PRR offered passenger-freight & auto ferriage between the Brooke St Terminal in Norfolk, Virginia - Old Point Comfort in Hampton, Virginia & Cape Charles, Virginia, a 36 miles (58 km) run. This operation was terminated by the PRR on February 28, 1953.

Amid dissatisfaction with the VFC operations in 1954, by act of the Virginia General Assembly, the Chesapeake Bay Ferry District (CBFD) and a related oversight commission were created, initially with the hopes of improving the ferry service. However, the governmental agency was soon authorized to sell toll revenue bonds, acquire the still-operating private Little Creek Ferry and improve existing ferry service. The VFC was sold and its five operating ferries to the Chesapeake Bay Ferry District for $13 million on May 17, 1956.

The Virginia Department of Transportation automobile-ferry service from Old Point Comfort across Hampton Roads to Willoughby Spit was replaced on November 1, 1957 by the new Hampton Roads Bridge-Tunnel, which followed the Norfolk-Portsmouth Bridge-Tunnel (1952), and was the second bridge-tunnel in Virginia. This stimulated interest in the feasibility of a similar crossing at the mouth of the Chesapeake Bay.

== Chesapeake Bay Bridge-Tunnel ==
A portion of the bond revenue used to purchase the Virginia Ferry Corporation was set aside to study and determine the feasibility of a fixed crossing of the lower bay. It was determined that a bridge-tunnel complex was feasible.

In 1958, the district hired its first executive director, J. Clyde Morris, a long-time governmental manager in Warwick County and the City of Newport News. Soon, steps to consider routing and implementation were underway. Consideration was given to service between the Eastern Shore and both the Peninsula and South Hampton Roads. Eventually, the shortest route, extending between the Eastern Shore and a point in Princess Anne County at Chesapeake Beach (east of Little Creek, west of Lynnhaven Inlet), was selected. An option to also provide a fixed crossing link to Hampton and the Peninsula was not pursued.

In August 1960, the District sold US$200 million toll revenue bonds and the first pile of the CBBT was driven in the seabed on October 1, 1960 and the project was completed on April 15, 1964. Princess Anne County consolidated with the City of Virginia Beach less than a year earlier. Ferry riders were able to view the construction for 3.5 years prior to its opening.

== Operations ==
Ferry operations started with the Virginia ferry Corporation (VFC) on April 1 1933 between Little Creek in Princess Anne County (VA Beach today) and the town of Cape Charles. The VFC leased the PRR Steamer SS Maryland and the Carfloat No. 605. The run was across the bay was 26 miles taking 1 hour 45 minutes to cross. The first new build in 1934 for the VFC was the steamer SS DEL-MAR-VA 260 foot Length overall (LOA). She released the Carfloat No. 605 back to the PRR. The second new build in 1936 was the 260 feet (LOA) SS PRINCESS ANNE which released the SS MARYLAND back to the PRR. The third new build in 1941 was the 300 feet (LOA) the SS POCAHONTAS. The fourth vessel added in 1948 was the Motor Vessel (MV) NORTHAMPTON, a)USS LST-63, b)HMS LST-63 328 feet (LOA) converted into a roll on/roll off (RO/RO)ferry from a US Navy LST.

To lessen crossing time the VFC bought land eight and half miles down the Del-Mar-Va peninsula from Cape Charles at Kiptopeke Beach and created a man-made harbor using nine concrete surplus ships from WWII. This shortened the crossing from 26 miles to 21 miles, cutting 20 minutes in the actual crossing time. The first crossing from Kiptopeke was made by the SS PRINCESS ANNE on May 1 1950.

A fifth vessel was added in 1951, the MV ACCOMAC, a)SS Virginia LEE, b)MV Holiday. Built in 1928 she is 300 feet (LOA).

In April 1954 the SS PRINCESS ANNE was cut in two and a 90-foot midsection built bringing her length to 350 feet (LOA).

Also in April 1955 the SS DEL-MAR-VA was cut in two adding 90 feet in her length to 350 feet (LOA).

Up bounds in traffic demanded more than the VFC could provide and the VFC was sold to the Chesapeake Bay Ferry District (CBFD) on May 17 1956.

CBFT first order of business was to reestablish a ferry crossing from Old Point Comfort in Hampton VA. (Fort Monroe) to the Del-Mar-Va peninsula. With the opening of the Hampton Roads Bridge Tunnel (HRBT) on November 1 1957, the Willoughby Spit-Old Point Comfort ferry ceased. This left a ferry terminal open for use. The terminal was modified to handle the much larger vessels CBFD fleet. Also in 1957 the SS POCAHONTAS was cut in two with a 76-foot midsection build increasing her length to 376 feet (LOA).

With a second route being established required another vessel and another US Navy LST was converted into RO/RO ferry at Newport News Shipbuilding in 1957. She is the MV OLD POINT COMFORT, a) USS LST-970, b) MV Albany. The OLD Point COMFORT reestablished ferry service to Old Point Comfort on February 15 1958.

In 1959 another US Navy surplus LST was purchased to become the MV VIRGINIA BEACH, a)USS LST-510, b)USS Buncombe County LST-510. Converted into a RO/RO ferry at Norfolk Shipbuilding & Drydock in 1959.

Due to lack of patronage the Old Point Comfort-Kiptopeke route was terminated in September 1960, one month before the first pile was driven for the CBBT.

The CBFD could operate seven vessels during peak times of the year carrying 636 autos of that time on a one-way trip. They ranged from 300 feet in length to 376 feet and averaged between 12 and 14 knots in speed, the MV ACCOMAC being the fastest and the LST's being the slowest. They had a full restaurant onboard and from Memorial Day to Labor Day offered moonlight cruises on Wednesday and Saturday nights with a full orchestra on the 8:05PM departures from Little Creek. They operated in extreme weather conditions only stopping for whole gale winds. They would be awash with spray, sometimes green water and numerous passengers seasick. It was like going on a small ocean liner for brief period of time. The cost to cross the bay was in 1962 was $3.00 for an automobile and $.85 per passenger. Today to cross the CBBT is $16.00 in the off-season and $18.00 during peak season.

The SS POCAHONTAS flagship of the fleet made the last crossing on April 15 1964. Five of the ferries were sold to the Delaware River & Bay Authority to start a new crossing between Lewes, DE & North Cape May, NJ. Only one of the old ferry fleet is still in operation and that is the c)MV VIRGINIA BEACH now operating for the Cross Sound Ferry (CSF) between New London, CT & Orient Point, NY under the name d)Cape Henlopen, c)Virginia Beach, b) USS Buncombe County LST-510, a)USS LST-510. The Virginia Dept. of Highways has carried the Pocahontas name on to the newest ferry built for the Jamestown-Scotland wharf run on the James R. The old ferry terminal at Kiptopeke is now a state park and most of the old ferrying is still in use for park use. The Little Creek terminal is pretty much gone and what is left is commercial.

The ferry service took 85 minutes during clear weather.

The SS Delmarva, SS Princess Anne operated out of Cape Charles to Little Creek from about 1933 to 1941. The SS Pocahontas augmented service through 1950, with other ferries following later.

The flagship of the seven-ship fleet, the 367-ft. SS Pocahontas — which reportedly carried a cask containing earth from the grave in England of the legendary Native American Princess Pocahontas — carried 1,200 passengers and 120 vehicles. The six other ferries carried from 68 to 120 cars and up to 1,200 passengers. Service ran hourly until 1 a.m.

The Commonwealth of Virginia reused the name "Pocahontas" for the newest of the current ferryboats at the Jamestown-Scotland Ferry on the James River

Several of the ferryboats from the defunct Little Creek-Cape Charles service were used to begin the Cape May-Lewes Ferry, which inaugurated service on July 1, 1964 and carried traffic from U.S. Highway 9 across the 17 miles (27 km) mouth of the Delaware Bay between Cape May, New Jersey and Lewes, Delaware.
