= Cape May–Lewes Ferry =

Ferry system in Delaware and New Jersey

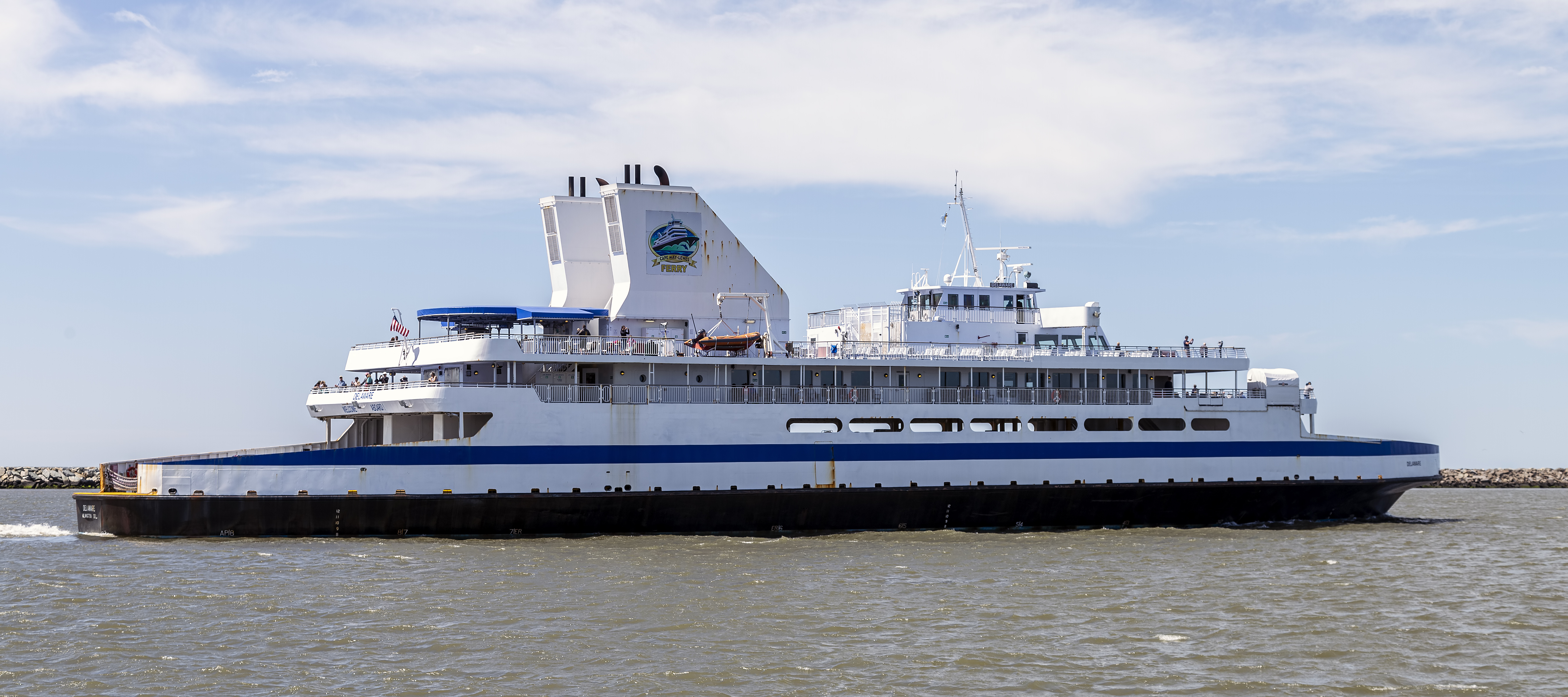
- M.V. Delaware near the Lewes, Delaware terminal on May 21, 2019
- Locale: US 9, North Cape May, New Jersey–Lewes, Delaware
- Waterway: Delaware Bay
- Transit type: Passenger/automobile ferry
- Owner: Delaware River and Bay Authority
- Operator: Delaware River and Bay Authority
- Began operation: July 1, 1964
- System length: 17 miles (27 km)
- No. of lines: 1
- No. of vessels: 3
- No. of terminals: 2
- Website: http://www.cmlf.com/

The Cape May–Lewes Ferry is a ferry system on the East Coast of the United States that traverses a 17-mile (27 km) crossing of the Delaware Bay connecting North Cape May, New Jersey with Lewes, Delaware. The ferry constitutes a portion of U.S. Route 9 and is the final crossing of the Delaware River-Delaware Bay waterway before it meets the Atlantic Ocean. It is one of only two year-round direct crossings between Delaware and New Jersey, the other being the Delaware Memorial Bridge.

== System ==
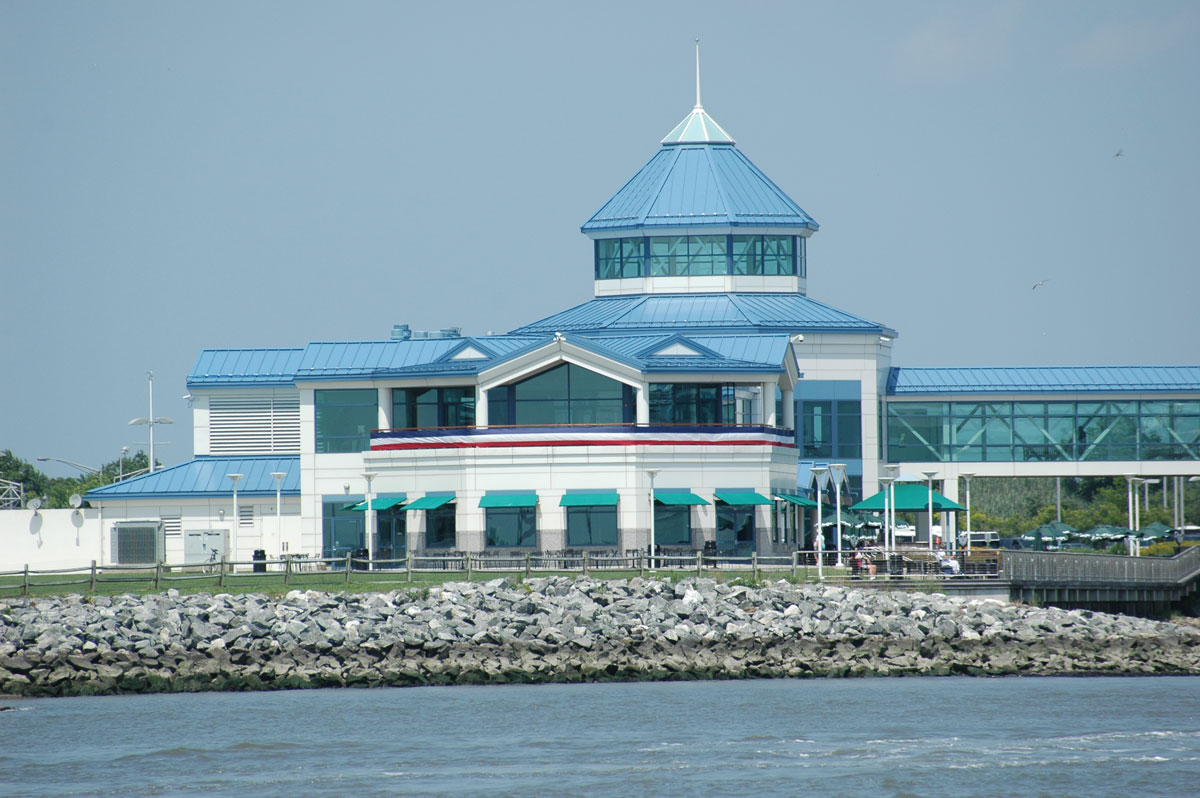
The Cape May, New Jersey terminal

The Cape May–Lewes Ferry, operated by the Delaware River and Bay Authority (DRBA), consists of three ferry vessels and two terminal facilities. Its operations are based at its Cape May terminal, which is actually located in North Cape May, on the north shore of the Cape May Canal.

The three vessels in the fleet carry both vehicles (passenger cars, buses, RVs, tractor trailers, motorcycles, and bicycles) and foot passengers. Each has a capacity of 100 vehicles and 800 passengers, selling out in advance during the popular summer weekends (although passenger capacity usually does not). Advance reservations are accepted.

The ferry trip takes approximately 85 minutes. The company's site says that the roundtrip is approximately three hours. The ferry provides a view of three lighthouses: the Cape May Light in New Jersey, and the Harbor of Refuge Light and Delaware Breakwater East End Light near Lewes.

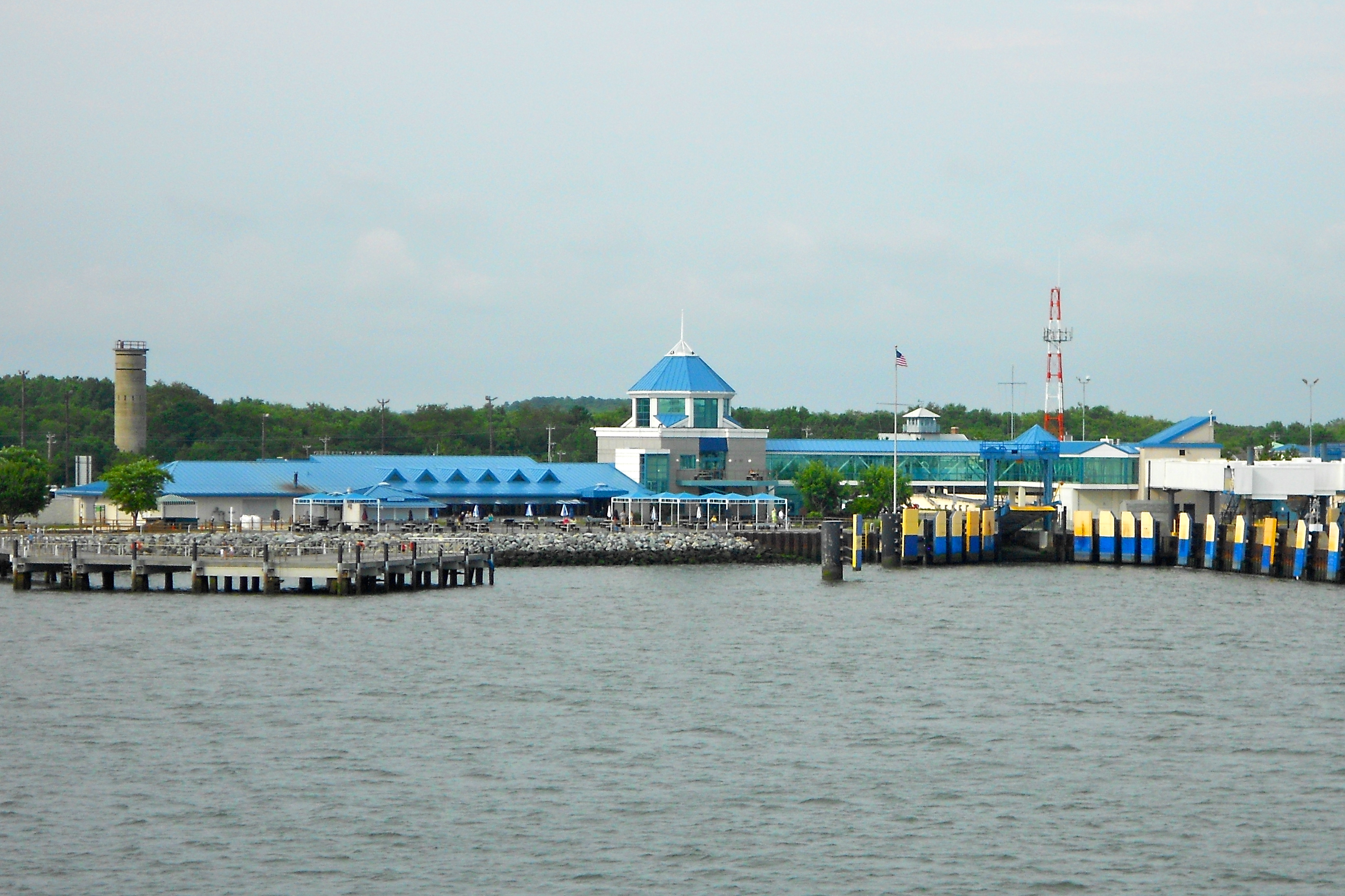
The Lewes, Delaware terminal

The ferry has two terminal facilities. Both host toll booths, vehicle staging areas, parking lots, and a terminal building with ticket counters for walk on passengers, restroooms and dining facilities. The Cape May Terminal also hosts the maintenance facility for the three vessels, along with lay berths. The terminals were substantially expanded during the mid 1980's with new terminal buildings built in Lewes in 1984 and Cape May in 1988 along with new toll booths and passenger loading buildings. The terminal building in Lewes was renovated and expanded in 1999 and a new Cape May terminal building replaced the existing structure, in 2001. Both terminals now feature unique, recognizable "towers," which contain elevators and staircases connecting the terminal buildings to glass-enclosed walkways. The walkways allow foot passengers to board the vessel directly on the second deck from the terminal building, avoiding vehicles driving onto the car deck below.

As the ferry is a part of US 9, it is included as part of the U.S. Highway System. The only other U.S. Route to use a ferry is U.S. Route 10, which uses the SS Badger across Lake Michigan. Routewise, taking the ferry avoids going around the Delaware Bay and avoids highways and bridges such as the New Jersey Turnpike, Delaware Memorial Bridge, US 13, and DE 1.

== Fleet ==
=== Current fleet ===
The current vessels are part of the second-generation Cape May Lewes Ferry fleet. The MV Delaware (1974) and MV New Jersey (1974) replaced the original ferry fleet that was purchased from the Chesapeake Bay that was in operation for the ferry's first 11 years until 1975. The MV Cape Henlopen (1981) (originally named MV New Del) and MV Cape May (1985) joined the fleet during the 1980s due to rapid growth in usage of the ferry. The MV Twin Capes was decommissioned in 2014 and the MV Cape May was decommissioned in 2010 leaving the Delaware, New Jersey, and Cape Henlopen in operation.

Each vessel consists of an open car deck situated atop a hull that is low to the water. Because of the ships' shallow displacements, the ships appear almost barge-like, sitting directly atop the water, from a distance. The ships were built with two decks atop the car deck with the second deck consisting of a gift shop, snack bar, and interior and exterior seating areas, and the third deck consisting of outdoor seating areas, an interior crew room. The pilot house is on the fourth deck. Subsequent renovations changed these plans on the vessels third decks with an exterior bar and an additional passenger lounge up forward on the MV Delaware.

Each vessel can hold 100 cars and 800 passengers. All have a length of 320 feet (98 m) and a breadth of 68 feet (21 m), a displacement of at least 2,100 tons, a maximum draft of 7 feet (2.1 m), two 4,000-horsepower (3,000 kW) diesel engines, and a top speed of 16 knots (30 km/h; 18 mph).

==== MV Delaware ====
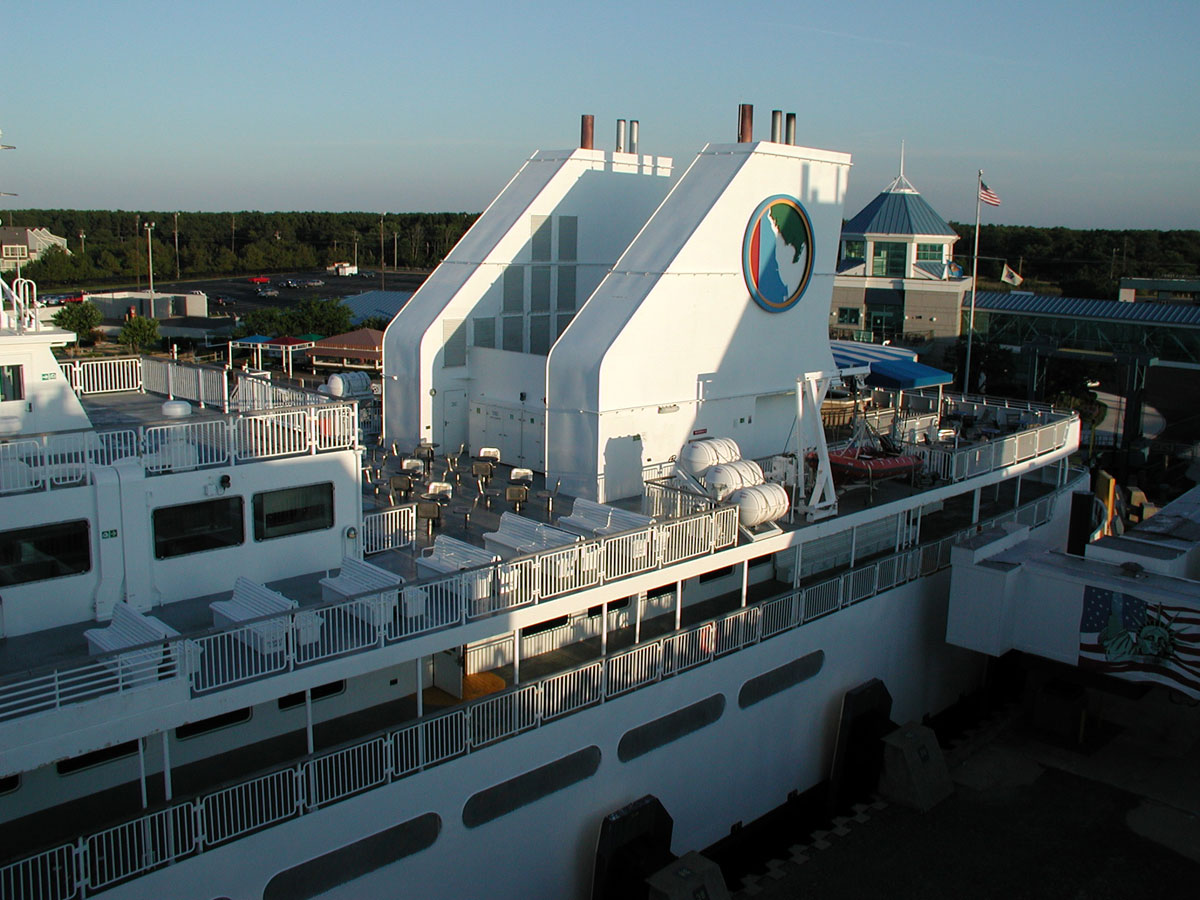
The "shark's fin" stacks of Delaware, pictured at the Lewes, Delaware, terminal, on July 6, 2004.

The Delaware was the first of the original three vessels of the new 1970s fleet. Christened in June 1974, she is the flagship of the fleet. Delaware has undergone several renovations and refurbishments. The first in 1994 added an additional passenger lounge on the third deck which included a deli and an outdoor bar with refurbishments to her main passenger lounge on the second deck. New "shark fin" smokestacks were added in 1997 replacing her original stacks. A renovation in 2001 resulted in her second and third decks being extended forward and aft and the outdoor bar moved behind the stacks along with renovations to both interior spaces. A third renovation in 2013 reconfigured the interior space on the second deck.

==== MV New Jersey ====
The New Jersey is the second of the original three vessels of the new 1970s fleet, christened in November 1974. An outdoor canopy was added to the third deck in 1996 and in 1999 she received upgraded finishes and seating to the interior passenger lounge. Her main passenger lounge was upgraded in 2013 with new carpeting and seating. In 2020–2021 New Jersey received a $20 million dollar renovation, refurbishment and upgrade when her exterior was sandblasted down to bare metal, her passenger lounge was gutted and stripped down to the studs, her pilothouse stripped down, original stacks removed and her original powerplant was taken out. It was replaced with new propulsion systems, new stacks, new windows and doors to the passenger lounge, a new console in the pilot house and a fresh coat of paint giving the MV New Jersey many more years of reliable, safe, and comfortable service.

==== MV Cape Henlopen ====
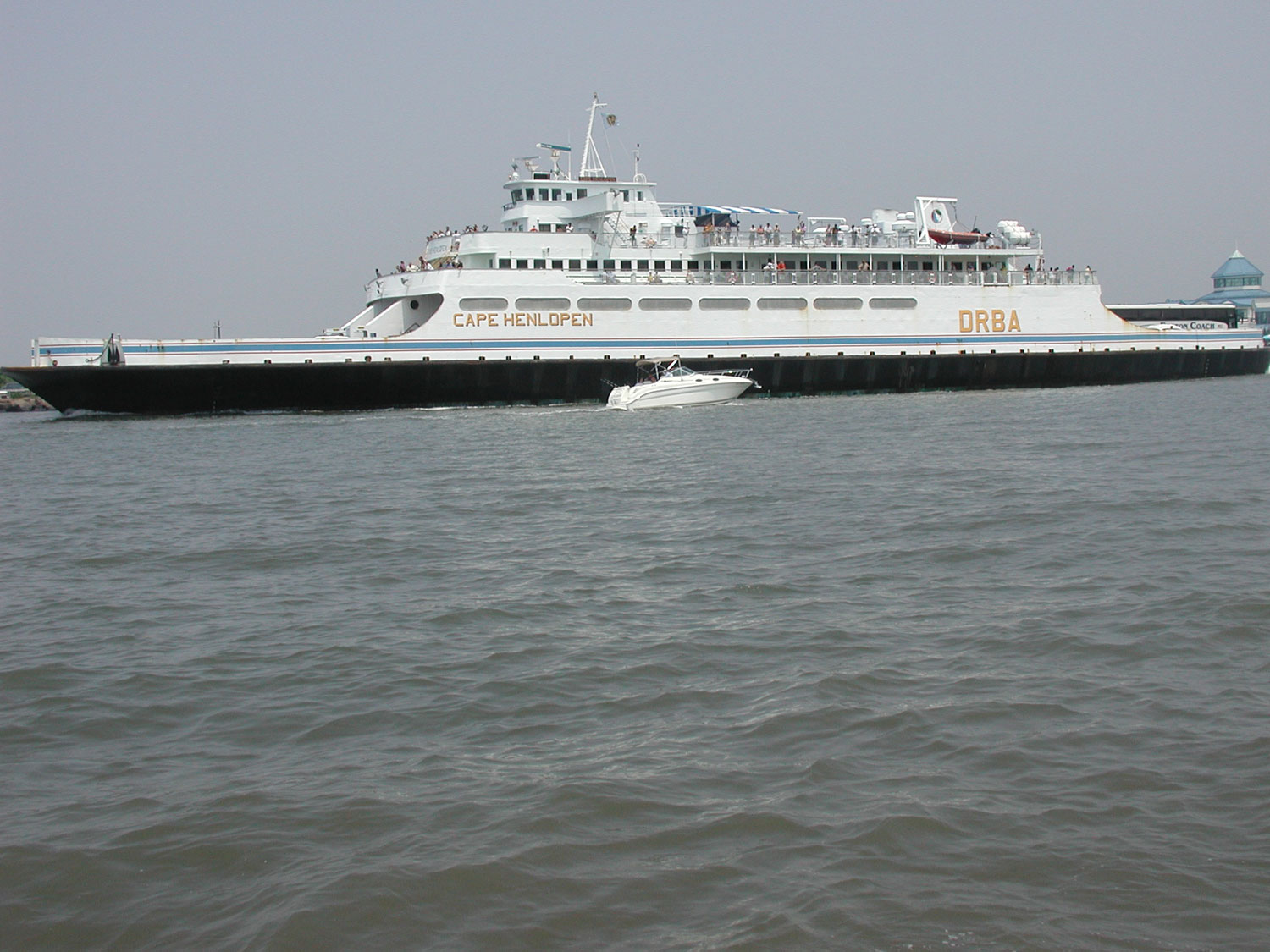
The MV Cape Henlopen near the Cape May, New Jersey, terminal on July 4, 2003.

The Cape Henlopen, the fourth vessel of the fleet built in 1981 was christened New Del in July 1981. The vessel was renamed Cape Henlopen in 1984. She received new outdoor seating and a canopy along with new indoor seating in 1998. A more recent refurbishment in 2012 resulted in new interior lighting, flooring, seating and climate control. The ferry plans to retire Cape Henlopen by the year 2027.

=== Former fleet ===
The original fleet of four steamships and two diesel-powered ships was purchased in 1964 from the defunct Little Creek-Cape Charles Ferry in Virginia, replaced by the Chesapeake Bay Bridge–Tunnel. Those ships were the SS Cape May (originally the SS Delmarva 1934), SS Delaware (originally the SS Pocahontas 1941), SS New Jersey (originally the SS Princess Anne 1936), the MV Cape Henlopen (originally named USS Buncombe County in 1944 and renamed the MV Virginia Beach in 1955) and later in 1964, MV Atlantic (originally the MV Old Point Comfort converted from USS LST-970) (this vessel was sold at the end of 1966).

The four remaining ships were replaced beginning in 1974 with five new, diesel-powered vessels, of which two have themselves been retired.

==== MV Twin Capes ====
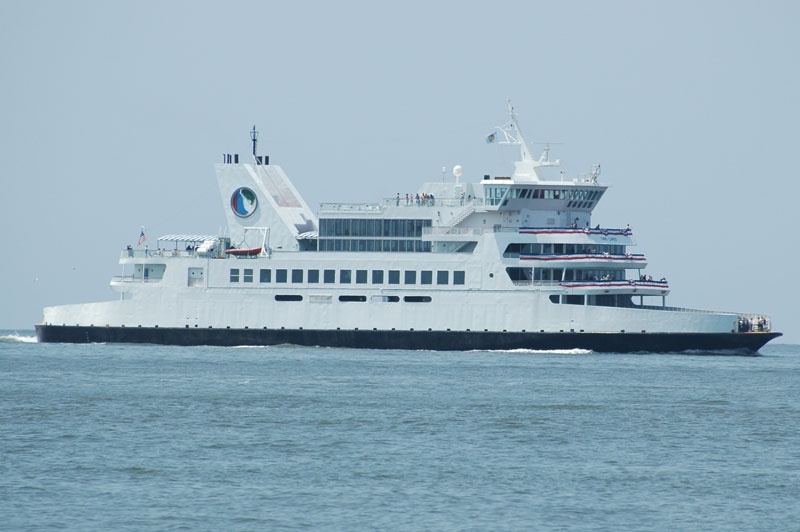
MV Twin Capes near the Cape May, New Jersey terminal on July 4, 2005. After her retirement in 2013, she was scuttled to form part of an artificial reef on June 15, 2018.

The Twin Capes was one of the original three vessels of the 1970s fleet, christened in May 1975. She was extensively renovated in a $27 million project between 1994 and 1996 resulting in the original superstructure on and above the second deck removed, the second deck extended forward and aft, and a new superstructure with four new decks, multiple lounges, new pilot house and "shark fin" smokestacks added. The vessel was then marked as a miniature cruise ship, complete with two sets of elevators, a sweeping interior staircase, interior areas on four different decks, an enlarged retail shop, a food court with a brick pizza oven, four different bars, and a buffet restaurant in a two-deck-tall, glass-enclosed atrium. Although the restaurant was shut down in 2000 after U.S. Food and Drug Administration inspectors found numerous violations in the galleys of all five vessels, the ship remained an attraction. Her sister ship is the MV Delaware. In July 2010, due to decreasing ridership, the DRBA announced that the vessel was for sale. The Twin Capes was taken out of service and retired in October 2013. On July 20, 2017, the Twin Capes was towed out of the Cape May Terminal to be stripped before a planned sinking as an artificial reef in 2018 in a project led by Captain Tim Mullane. The Twin Capes was scuttled on June 15, 2018, in the North Atlantic Ocean off Bethany Beach, Delaware, at 38°30.90′N 074°30.90′W to form part of the Del-Jersey-Land Inshore Artificial Reef.

==== MV Cape May ====
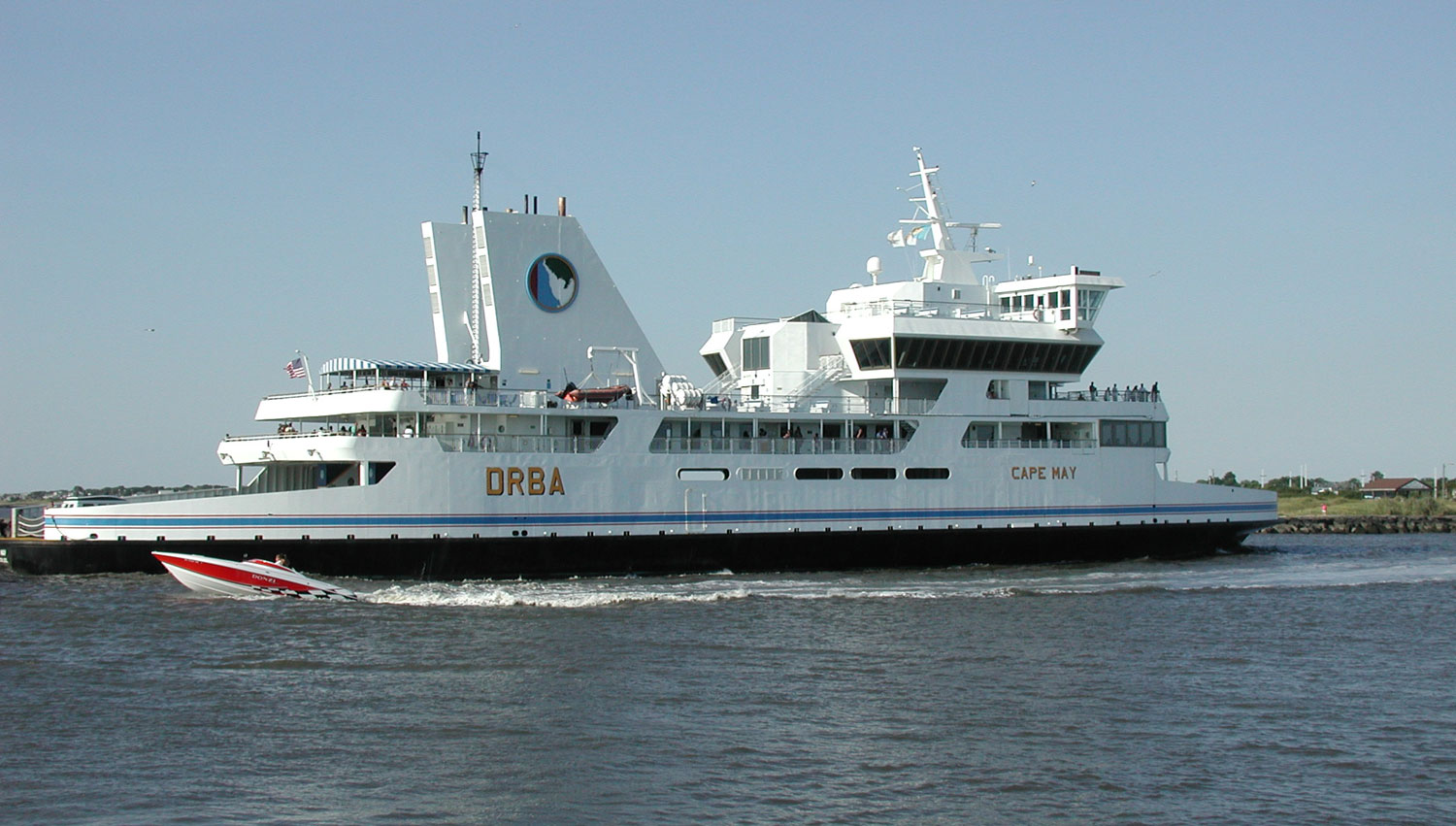
The Cape May ready to dock at the Cape May, New Jersey, terminal on August 8, 2002. In 2007, the DRBA removed Cape May from service.

The Cape May, which was the newest vessel of the fleet christened in May 1985, was refurbished in 1998 in a $20 million project that retained the original superstructure and added deck extensions and a new fourth deck. The renovation added a fourth-deck buffet restaurant, bars, an enlarged gift shop, an elevator, and additional interior seating. In 2007, in order to help close an operating deficit, the DRBA removed the Cape May from service and announced that the vessel was up for sale. The vessel's added expense of operation and low use—it had made only fifteen crossings in 2007—were additional factors leading to its removal from service. The owners of Cross Sound Ferry in Connecticut had shown interest in purchasing the ferry. In 2013, the Cape May was sold to Northstar Marine Services for $750,000, to be converted to a support vessel for offshore wind farms.

=== Future fleet ===
In November 2025, the Delaware River and Bay Authority awarded a $78.6 million contract to SENESCO Marine LLC for the construction of a new diesel-hybrid passenger and vehicle ferry for the Cape May–Lewes Ferry fleet. The vessel is designed to carry approximately 75 vehicles and is expected to enter service in 2029."DRBA Commission Awards Contract to Construct New "Green" Ferry" (Press release). Delaware River and Bay Authority. November 18, 2025.

The new ferry is intended to replace the aging MV Cape Henlopen, which has operated in the fleet for more than 40 years. According to the DRBA, the hybrid vessel is expected to reduce fuel consumption by approximately 35 percent while lowering emissions through a combination of hybrid and all-electric operating modes near terminals and while docked."DRBA Commission Awards Contract to Construct New "Green" Ferry" (Press release). Delaware River and Bay Authority. November 18, 2025. The project received partial funding through a $20 million grant from the U.S. Department of Transportation. Construction is scheduled to begin in 2026, with projected completion in summer 2029."DRBA Commission Awards Contract to Construct New "Green" Ferry" (Press release). Delaware River and Bay Authority. November 18, 2025.

== History ==
In 1926, a ferry between Cape May and Lewes was planned. The idea was to use a World War I military ship to transport passengers and cars across the Delaware Bay. The project was abandoned after a few months.

After several months of preparations, the Delaware River and Bay Authority conducted a trial run using the ferry Pocahantas borrowed from Virginia's Chesapeake Bay Ferry Commission on October 17, 1962.

Service officially began on July 1, 1964, utilizing a fleet of five ships purchased from Virginia. Those ships had previously provided service across the Chesapeake Bay, connecting Cape Charles with Virginia Beach, but the opening of the Chesapeake Bay Bridge–Tunnel in 1964 rendered that service obsolete. The first trip went from Cape May to Lewes. However, the first day of operation was marred when a cable tangled in a ferry ship's rudder delayed the second journey of the day by seven hours, stranding hundreds of New Jerseyans in Delaware until one of the other ships could be brought in to take its place.

All of the steamers were replaced in the 1970s with the service's current fleet.

When it began service, the Cape May–Lewes Ferry operated under a 24-hour schedule. That schedule was cut back in 1975 to 16 hours per day.

Nolan C. Chandler, a former oiler for Virginia's Norfolk–Kiptopeke Ferry, was the first manager of the Cape May–Lewes Ferry. Chandler started on March 15, 1964.

The Cape May–Lewes Ferry welcomed its first female permanent captain, Sharon Urban, in August 2020.

== Tourism ==
The ferry was constructed with transportation as its primary use, providing a connection between the south Jersey Shore towns and the Delaware Beaches and Ocean City, Maryland, on the Delmarva Peninsula. Prior to its inception, travelers between these areas needed to drive across southern New Jersey to the Delaware Memorial Bridge, and then down through Delaware on U.S. Route 13, or vice versa if they were coming from Delaware. The Delaware River and Bay Authority (DRBA) later recognized the ferry's potential as a tourist attraction. While it continues to provide transportation between Delaware and New Jersey, the experience has also been optimized to draw in tourists.

The ferry fleet was substantially overhauled during the 1990s, adding several amenities—including buffet restaurants, bars, and lounges—intended to promote the ride as a draw in itself. The DRBA operates a shuttle bus service on both sides of the bay in the summer months, giving foot passengers both a ride on the ferry and round-trip transportation from the terminals into Cape May and Lewes for one combined rate. In New Jersey, the shuttle connects the ferry to the Cape May Welcome Center in downtown Cape May. In Delaware, the shuttle operates from the ferry to the Tanger Outlets and a park and ride lot in Rehoboth Beach. DART First State operates the Route 204 bus which connects the ferry terminal with downtown Lewes and the Lewes Transit Center park and ride, where transfers can be made to DART First State's Beach Bus routes that serve the Delaware Beaches and provide connections to Ocean City Transportation's Coastal Highway Beach Bus in Ocean City, Maryland. The DRBA also operates a shuttle bus that links the ferry to the Cape May County Park & Zoo on select days from late June through August and to the Tree to Tree Aerial adventure park at the zoo from late May to late September. The Mid-Atlantic Center for the Arts operates trolley tours of Cape May, the Cape May Lighthouse, and the Emlen Physick Estate from the ferry terminal from late June to the end of August. A private operator also runs a coach bus that connects the ferry in Cape May to the Resorts Casino Hotel in Atlantic City; the package includes round-trip ferry service, round-trip coach service, and free play for slots. The DRBA has partnered with local merchants to give discounts to passengers, allowing passengers to purchase a round-trip ticket and not disembark midway.

In addition to these promotions, the ferry also offers special holiday excursions, including the annual fireworks cruise on the Fourth of July. The cruise features entertainment on the car deck and a catered meal.

== Incidents and accidents ==
On the evening of December 10, 2009, the New Jersey ran aground on a sandbar near the mouth of the Cape May Canal during an unusually low tide. The ferry was freed by a rising tide and did not suffer any structural damage.

On March 30, 2019, after going three miles (4.8 km) from Cape May, New Jersey, the ferry lost power with 143 passengers on board. After two hours being stuck in the bay, the ferry was towed back to Cape May.

On November 17, 2020, after leaving Cape May in high winds, the Cape Henlopen ran aground off the coast of Cape May, New Jersey. The passengers were not harmed and the vessel was towed back to Cape May shortly after.

== See also ==
- U.S. Route 9 in Delaware
- U.S. Route 9 in New Jersey
- SS Atlantus, remainder of an early attempt to cross the bay
