= Turdo Vineyards & Winery =

American winery located in New Jersey

Coordinates: 38.969756°N 74.940819°W

- Location: 3911 Bayshore Road, North Cape May, NJ, USA
- Coordinates: 38.969756 N, 74.940819 W
- Appellation: Outer Coastal Plain AVA
- Other labels: Turis, DiLuca
- First vines planted: 1999
- Opened to the public: 2004
- Key people: Sal & Sara Turdo(owners); Luca Turdo (wine maker)
- Area cultivated: 5
- Cases/yr: 1,100 (2013)
- Known for: Nero d'Avola wines
- Other attractions: Pet-friendly
- Distribution: On-site, NJ liquor stores, NJ restaurants, home shipment
- Tasting: Daily tastings in summer Fri. and Sat. in May and Sept. Closed remainder of year
- Website: http://www.turdovineyards.com/

Turdo Vineyard & Winery (/tʊərˈdoʊ/ toor-DOH) is a winery in the North Cape May section of Lower Township in Cape May County, New Jersey. The vineyard was first planted in 1999, and opened to the public in 2004. Turdo has 5 acres of grapes under cultivation, and produces 1,100 cases of wine per year. The winery is named after the family that owns it.

== Wines ==
Turdo Vineyards is in the Outer Coastal Plain AVA, and specializes in the use of Italian grapes. Wine is produced from Albariño, Barbera, Cabernet Sauvignon, Merlot, Nebbiolo, Nero d'Avola, Pinot gris, Pinot noir, Riesling, Sangiovese, Sauvignon blanc, and Syrah grapes. Turdo is best known for its signature Nero d'Avola wine, and is one of only two wineries in the United States that uses Nero d'Avola, which is a highly aromatic red vinifera grape indigenous to Sicily. Turdo sells its wine under the brands "Turis" and "DiLuca," which are named after the owner of the winery and his son.

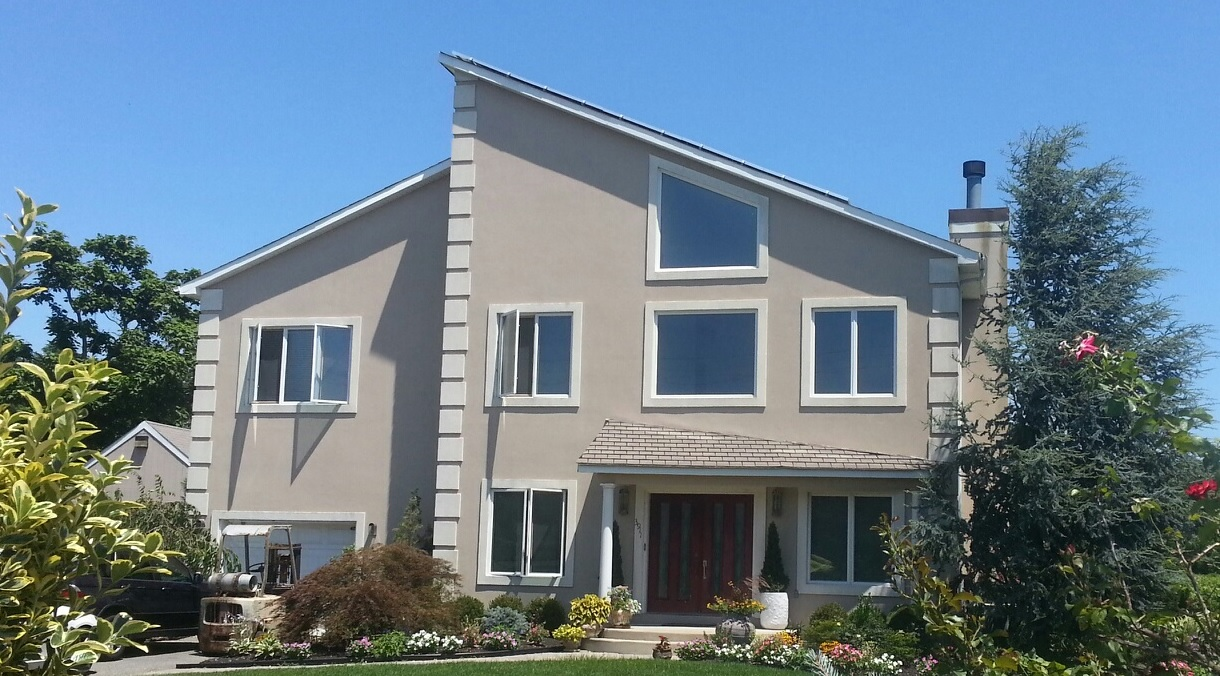
Turdo Vineyards & Winery is entirely powered by solar panels on top of the family's house.

== Features, licensing, associations, and publicity ==
The entire winery facility is powered using solar energy. Turdo has a farm winery license from the New Jersey Division of Alcoholic Beverage Control, which allows it to produce up to 50,000 gallons of wine per year, operate up to 15 off-premises sales rooms, and ship up to 12 cases per year to consumers in-state or out-of-state. The winery is not a member of the Garden State Wine Growers Association, but is a member of the Outer Coastal Plain Vineyard Association. In April 2009, Turdo was profiled by stand-up comedian Jay Leno on The Tonight Show.

== See also ==
- Alcohol laws of New Jersey
- American wine
- Judgment of Princeton
- List of wineries, breweries, and distilleries in New Jersey
- New Jersey Farm Winery Act
- New Jersey Wine Industry Advisory Council
- New Jersey wine
