= U.S. Route 9 =

Discontinuous north-south U.S. route

U.S. Route 9

Route information
- Length: 522.73 mi (841.25 km)
- Existed: 1926–present

Major junctions
- South end: US 13 at Laurel, DE
- US 40 / US 322 in Pleasantville, NJ; US 30 in Absecon, NJ; US 1 from Woodbridge, NJ to New York, NY; I-78 / US 22 in Newark, NJ; I-95 / US 46 from Fort Lee, NJ to New York, NY; US 6 / US 202 in Peekskill, NY; I-84 in Fishkill, NY; US 44 at Poughkeepsie, NY; US 20 at Schodack Center, NY; I-90 in Albany, NY
- North end: I-87 in Champlain, NY just south of the Canadian border

Location
- Country: United States
- States: Delaware, New Jersey, New York

Highway system
- United States Numbered Highway System; List; Special; Divided
← US 8	→ US 10

U.S. Route 9 (US 9) is a north–south United States Numbered Highway in the states of Delaware, New Jersey, and New York in the Northeastern United States. It is one of only two U.S. Highways with a ferry connection (the Cape May–Lewes Ferry, between Lewes, Delaware, and North Cape May, New Jersey); the other is US 10. US 9 is signed east–west in Delaware and north–south on the rest of its route. The southern terminus of the route is in Laurel, Delaware, at an intersection of US 13, (Note: Southern terminus located near 38.570141°N 75.562209°W) while the highway's northern terminus is at an interchange with I-87 in Champlain, New York, where the old roadway continues north as the unsigned New York State Route 971B (NY 971B) (0.46 m/0.74 km), which ends in a cul-de-sac just short of the Canadian border.

== Route description ==
Lengths
	mi	km
DE	30.92	49.76
NJ	166.80	268.44
NY	325.01	523.05
Total	522.73	841.25

Much of US 9 is a two-lane road, with some expansions near more populous areas. The major exception to this is central and northern New Jersey, where it is a wide four-lane (or six-lane) divided strip, especially during much of its concurrency with US 1 and in Middlesex and Monmouth counties. New York boasts a few similar sections, as well as two short expressway sections near Albany.

In New Jersey, US 9 mainly runs parallel to the Garden State Parkway, and, in New York, most of US 9 runs parallel to I-87.

=== Delaware ===
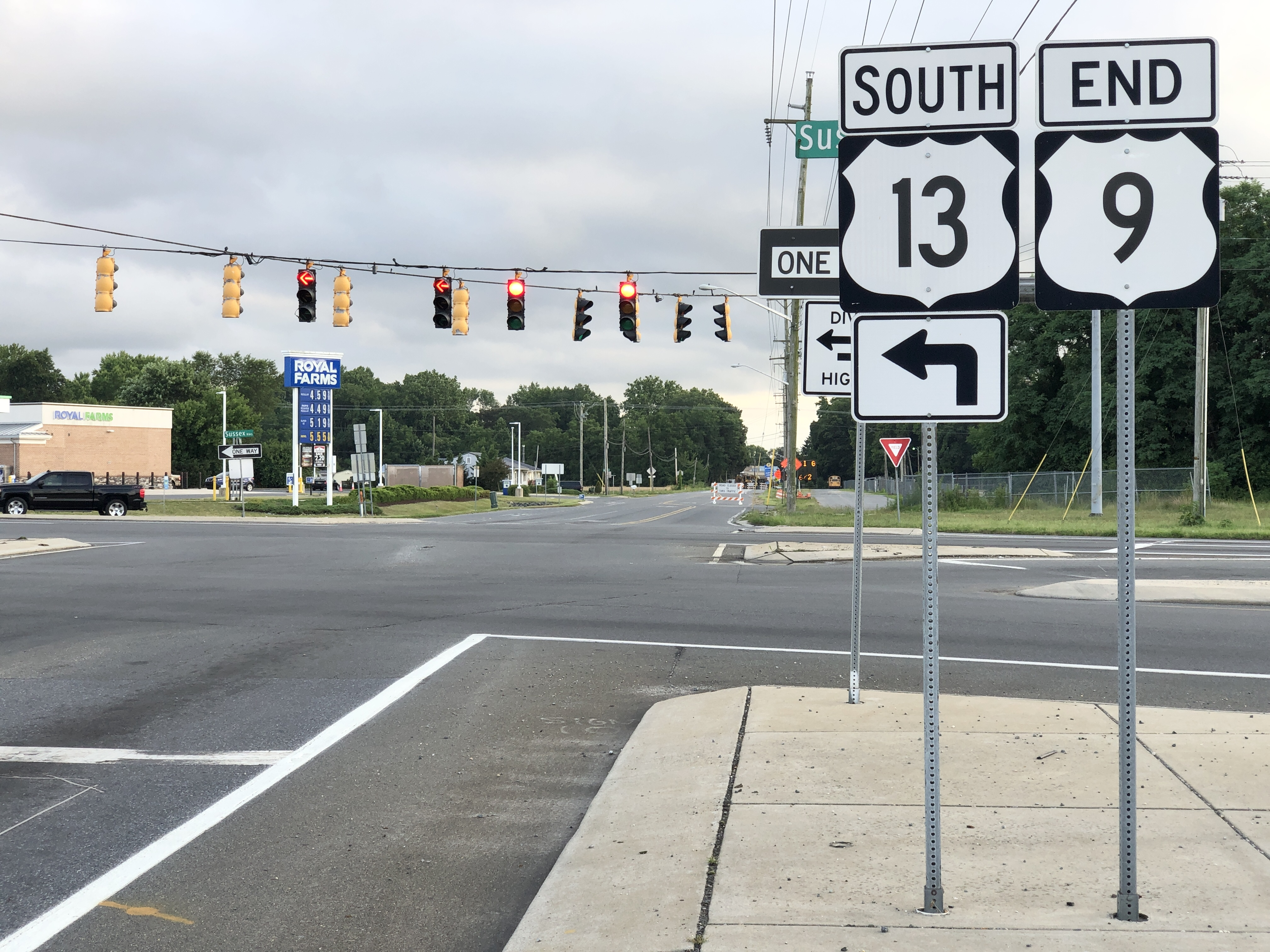
Southern (Western) terminus of US 9 at US 13 in Laurel, Delaware

US 9 runs an east–west path through Sussex County, running east from US 13 in Laurel, passing through Georgetown, east to Lewes, where it leads to the Cape May–Lewes Ferry, which carries US 9 across the Delaware Bay to New Jersey. US 9 was extended to Delaware by way of the Cape May–Lewes Ferry in 1974, replacing Delaware Route 28 (DE 28) between Laurel and Georgetown and DE 18 between Georgetown and Lewes. US 9 runs concurrent with DE 404 between Georgetown and the Five Points intersection near Lewes.

=== New Jersey ===
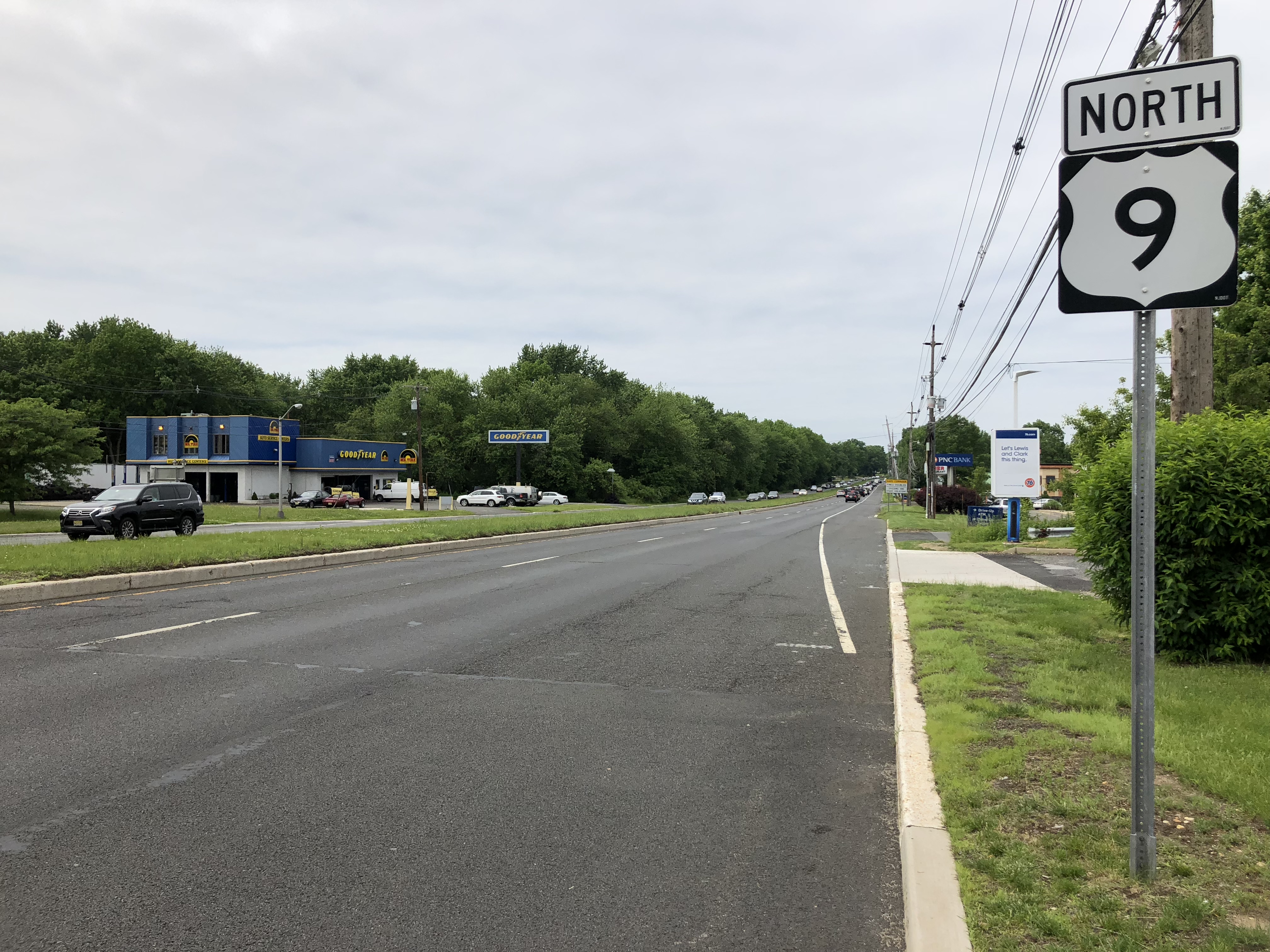
US 9 northbound in Manalapan Township, New Jersey

From Cape May, US 9 runs north parallel to the Garden State Parkway, until briefly joining the Parkway to cross Great Egg Harbor Bay on the reconstructed Great Egg Harbor Bridge following the demolition of the Beesley's Point Bridge. US 9 then exits the Parkway north of the bridge (where the Parkway includes a toll on all US 9 and Parkway traffic in the southbound direction) and runs through the Atlantic City suburbs, until joining the Parkway briefly again to cross the Mullica River estuary in the Pine Barrens region of South Jersey. At New Gretna, US 9 exits the parkway and parallels wooded areas and marshlands along Little Egg Harbor and Manahawkin and Barnegat bays, passing Manahawkin and paralleling Long Beach Island, until South Toms River where the highway rejoins the Parkway for a third and final time through Toms River. In Toms River exists the only Parkway/US 9 concurrency with interim interchanges at Parkway exits 81 and 82, before exiting the parkway at exit 83 and continuing north through Toms River to Lakewood, where the road becomes a divided highway that follows a more inland route through Howell Township, Freehold Township, Manalapan Township, Marlboro Township, Old Bridge Township, Sayreville, and into Perth Amboy. From there, the road resumes its parallel course with the Garden State Parkway. After crossing the Edison Bridge over the Raritan River, it merges with US 1 in Woodbridge Township. The concurrency, an important and busy regional artery, continues past Newark Liberty International Airport and over the Pulaski Skyway, finally leaving the state along with US 1 and I-95 via the George Washington Bridge.

==== Overlap with US 1 ====
A type of sign found on and near the concurrent US 1 and US 9 in New Jersey

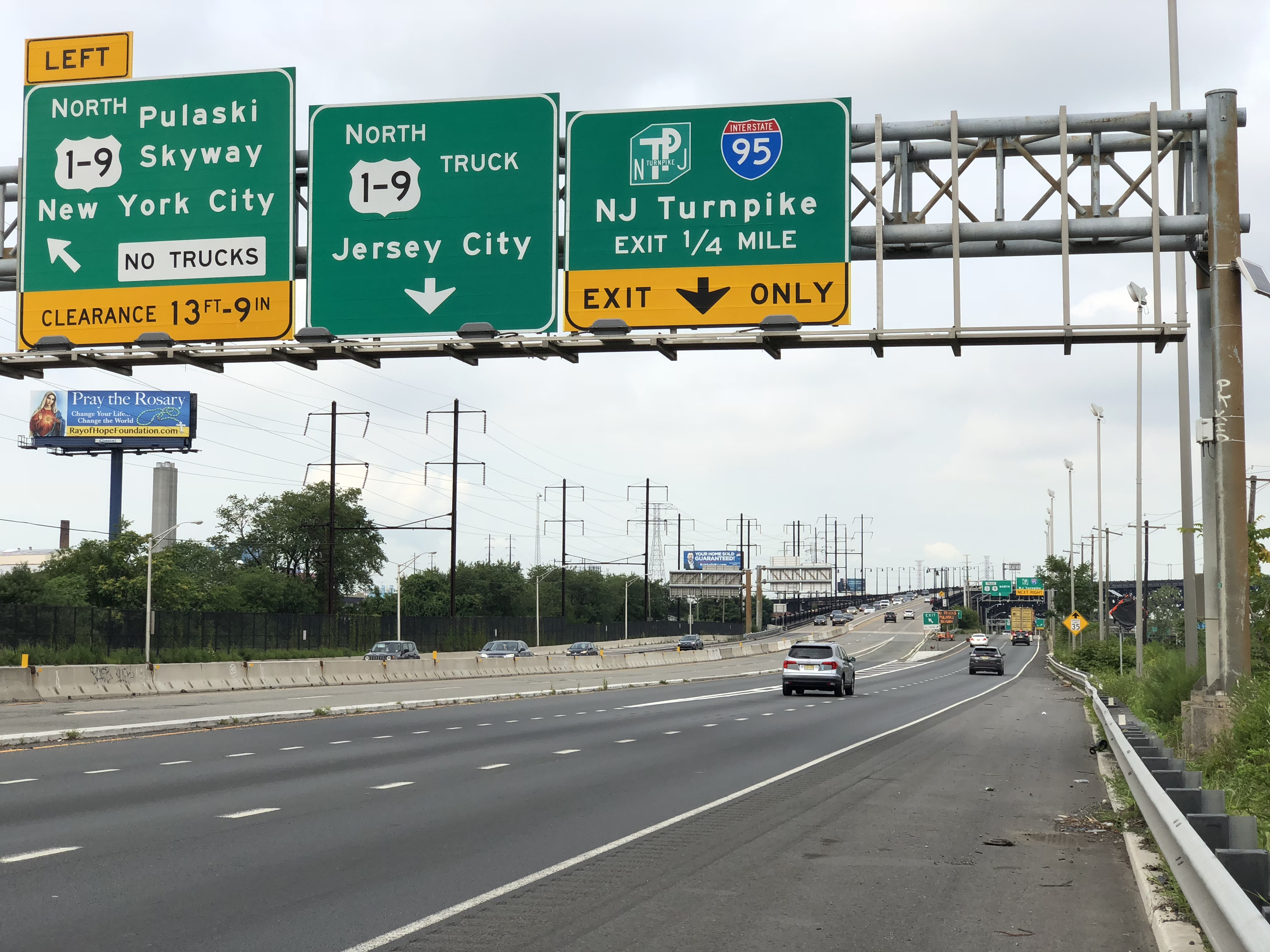
US 1/9 northbound in Newark, New Jersey approaching the Pulaski Skyway

A large section in northeast New Jersey and a small section in southern New York is concurrent with US 1. Route shields on this section, which includes the Pulaski Skyway, often show both numbers in the same shield, with an endash or ampersand between (1–9 or 1&9). It is known locally as "one and nine" or "one-nine".

=== New York ===
US 9 exits shortly after the George Washington Bridge to go onto New York City's Broadway north of it, passing over the northern tip of Manhattan Island via the toll-free Broadway Bridge, through the Bronx and into Westchester County, where in some towns it follows the old Albany Post Road, which dates from the early days of the nation's existence.

Following the Hudson River closely as a busy surface road through the many suburban river villages and past National Historic Landmarks such as Sunnyside and Kykuit, US 9 becomes the Croton Expressway between Croton-on-Hudson and Peekskill. That section ends at the Annsville Circle junction with US 6 and US 202, where US 9 returns to two-lane status as it follows the old post road inland, away from the river. At Fishkill, the road passes the historic Van Wyck Homestead Museum and it becomes a six-lane divided strip until reaching the Poughkeepsie city limit. It then narrows to a four-lane divided strip which lasts until it intersects St. Andrews Road, just north of the Hyde Park–Poughkeepsie town line where it returns to two-lane status as it goes through Hyde Park and past its historic sites.

At Red Hook, US 9 veers inland again, becoming a two-lane country road through Columbia County save for the outskirts of Hudson. In Rensselaer County, it widens again as it intersects I-90 and then joins US 20 to Albany, where it crosses the Hudson at the Dunn Memorial Bridge. It is a busy surface road through the state capital, becoming a strip in its northern suburbs and taking traffic eventually to Saratoga Springs, Glens Falls and Lake George, at the edge of the Adirondack Park.

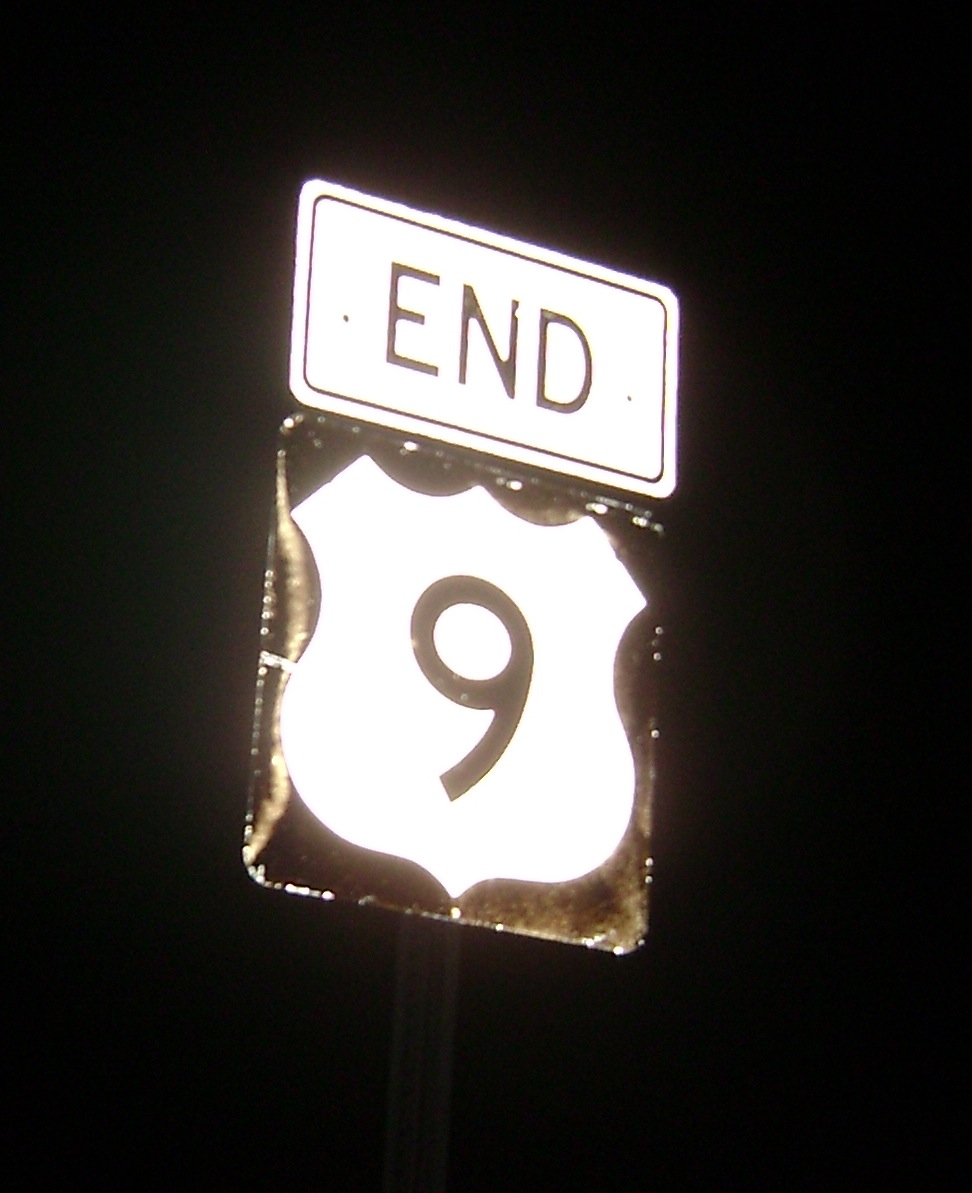
End US 9 sign just short of the Canadian border in Champlain, New York

The Adirondack section of US 9 is the least trafficked of the road, returning to two lanes as it runs through vast tracts of forested wilderness and occasional hamlets. Almost 100 miles (160 km) to the north, it leaves the park and runs along or near Lake Champlain to Plattsburgh. North of there, it is once again a two-lane road all the way to Champlain, ending at an onramp to I-87 just shy of the border.

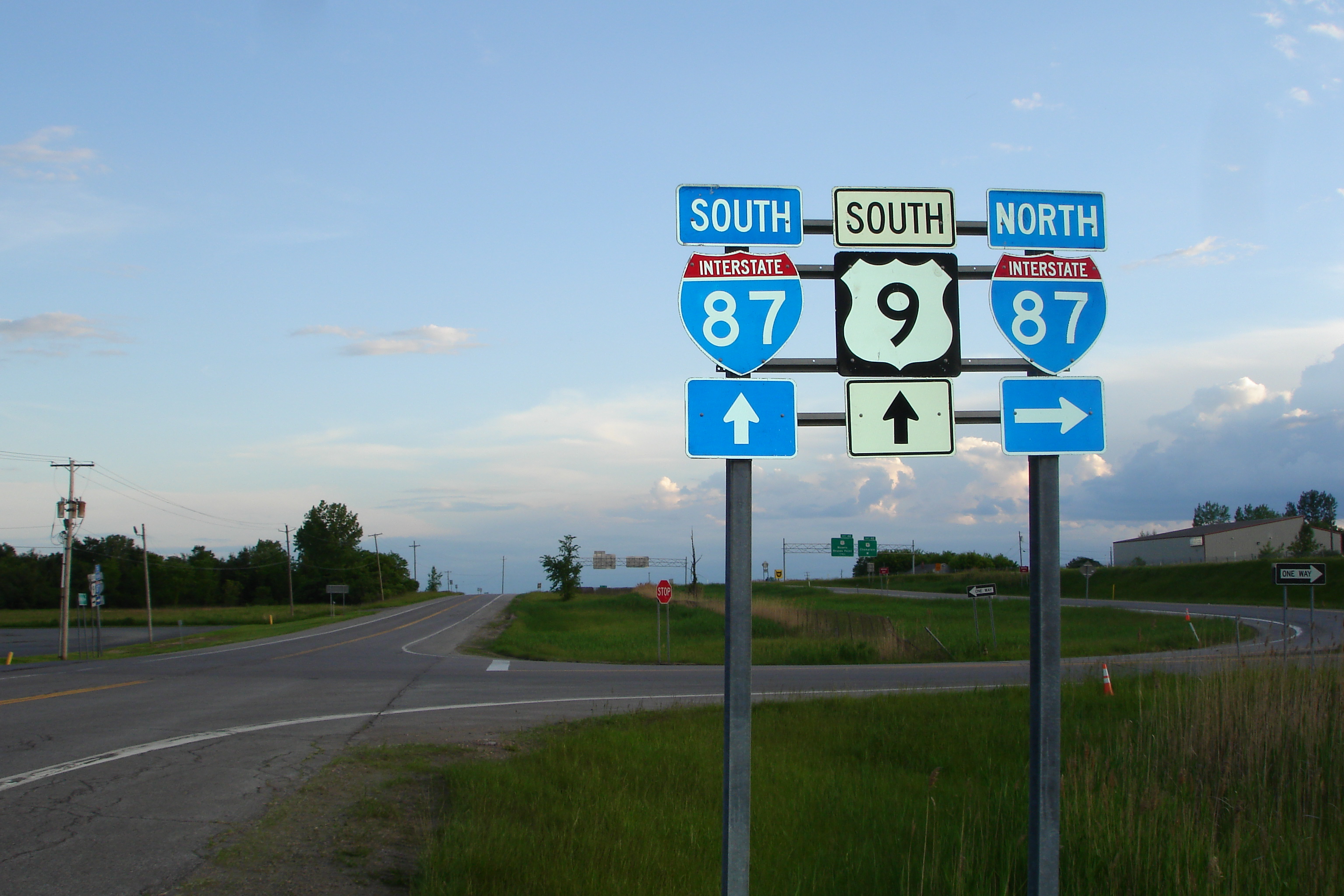
First northern reassurance marker on New York I-87/US 9

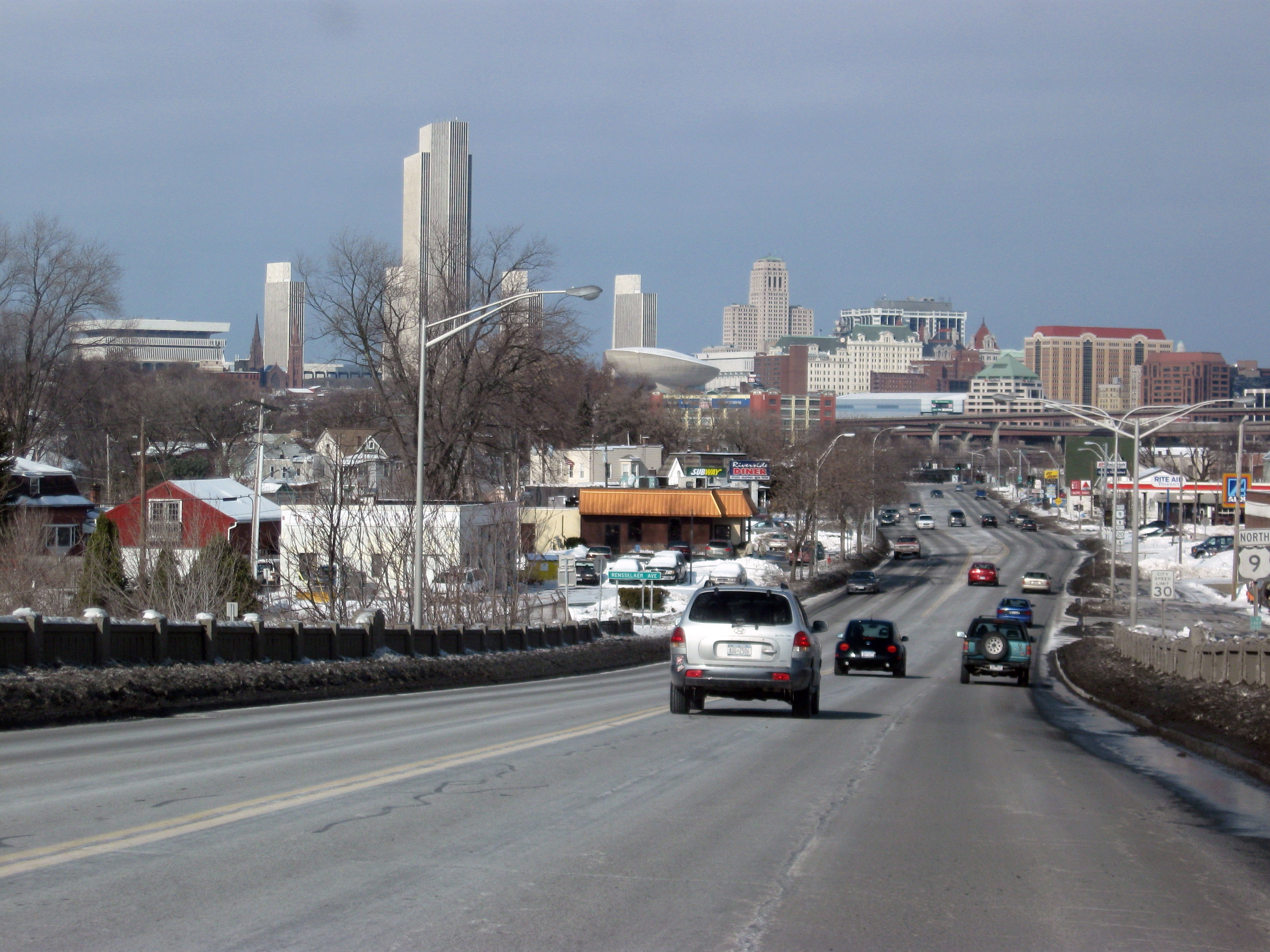
US 9 north as it approaches Albany

== History ==
Prior to the opening of the Cape May–Lewes Ferry in 1964, US 9 ended on Lafayette Street in Cape May, New Jersey. It was rerouted to the west, via Sandman Boulevard and Lincoln Avenues, to meet the new ferry, and its southern stub into Cape May was renumbered as Route 109.

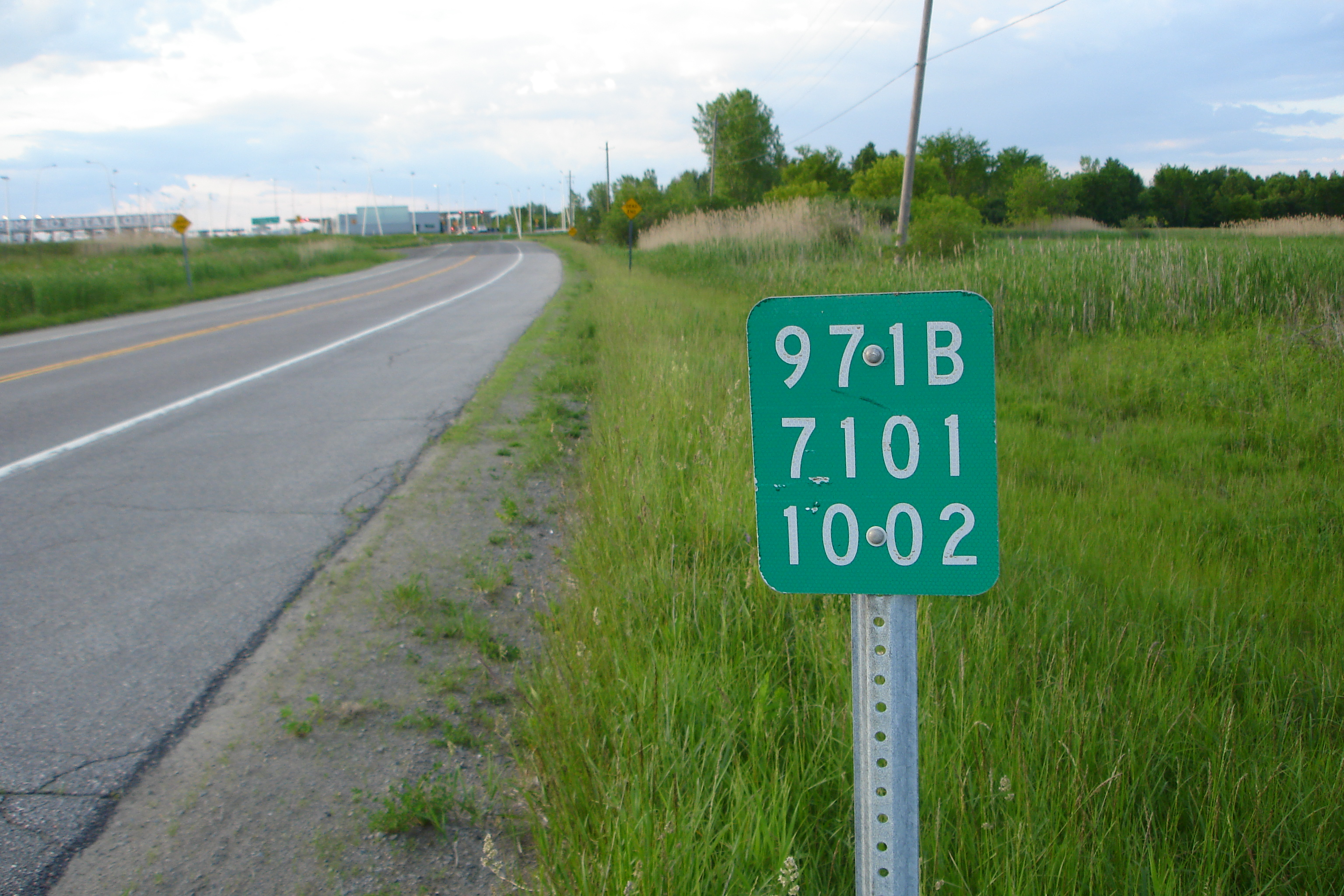
Last northern reference marker on NY 971B (former US 9); Canadian customs are seen to the left

Originally, the road continued north across the border (as Route 9 toward Montreal) through the customs facilities now used by I-87/Autoroute 15. The official northern terminus (the point where the "End US 9" sign is posted) is just south of the interchange with I-87, less than a mile (1.6 km) from customs. The old Route 9 continues north for a very short distance (0.46 m/0.74 km) as the unsigned New York State Route 971B (NY 971B), which ends in a cul-de-sac just short of the Canadian border.

== Major intersections ==
Delaware
US 13 northeast of Laurel
US 113 in Georgetown
Cape May–Lewes Ferry in Lewes. US 9 utilizes the ferry across Delaware Bay to North Cape May, New Jersey.
New Jersey
US 40 / US 322 in Pleasantville
US 30 in Absecon
I-195 in Howell
I-95 in Woodbridge
US 1 in Woodbridge Township. The highways travel concurrently to Manhattan, New York City.
I-278 in Linden
I-78 in Newark
US 22 in Newark
I-78 in Newark
US 46 in Palisades Park. The highways travel concurrently to the New Jersey–New York state line.
I-95 in Fort Lee. The highways travel concurrently to Manhattan, New York City.
US 9W in Fort Lee
New York
I-87 / I-287 in Tarrytown
US 6 / US 202 in Peekskill. The highways travel concurrently to northwest of Peekskill.
I-84 in Fishkill
US 44 in Poughkeepsie
I-90 in Schodack
US 20 in Schodack. The highways travel concurrently to Albany.
I-90 in Schodack
US 4 in East Greenbush
I-787 in Albany
US 9W in Albany
I-90 in Albany
I-87 south of Saratoga Springs
I-87 in Moreau
I-87 in Queensbury
US 11 in the Village of Champlain
I-87 to A-15 in the Town of Champlain

== In popular culture ==
The highway is mentioned in the Bruce Springsteen songs "Born to Run" and "The Promise". The highway, particularly the section around Freehold Township, New Jersey, is associated with Springsteen more generally. It is also mentioned in the Springsteen song "Last Man Standing".

It is also mentioned in the songs "My Geraldine Lies Over the Delaware" by The Wonder Years and "The Devil On Hwy 9" by Danzig.

The Breeders song "Drivin' on 9" refers to the route.

In Wayne Wang's film Smoke, Thomas Cole's father, Cyrus, runs a garage on US 9.

== See also ==
=== Related routes ===
- U.S. Route 109
- U.S. Route 209
- U.S. Route 309

=== Special and suffixed routes ===
- U.S. Route 9E
- U.S. Route 9W
- U.S. Route 9 Alternate in Toms River, New Jersey
- U.S. Route 1/9 Truck in Jersey City, New Jersey
- U.S. Route 1/9 Business in Jersey City, New Jersey
- U.S. Route 9 Truck in Georgetown, Delaware
- U.S. Route 9 Business in Lewes, Delaware

== Notes ==
Browse numbered routes
← NY 8	NY	→ NY 9A
← Route 7	NJ	→ Route 10
← DE 8	DE	→ DE 9
