= Cape May Winery & Vineyard =

Winery in New Jersey

Coordinates: 38.973142°N 74.923559°W

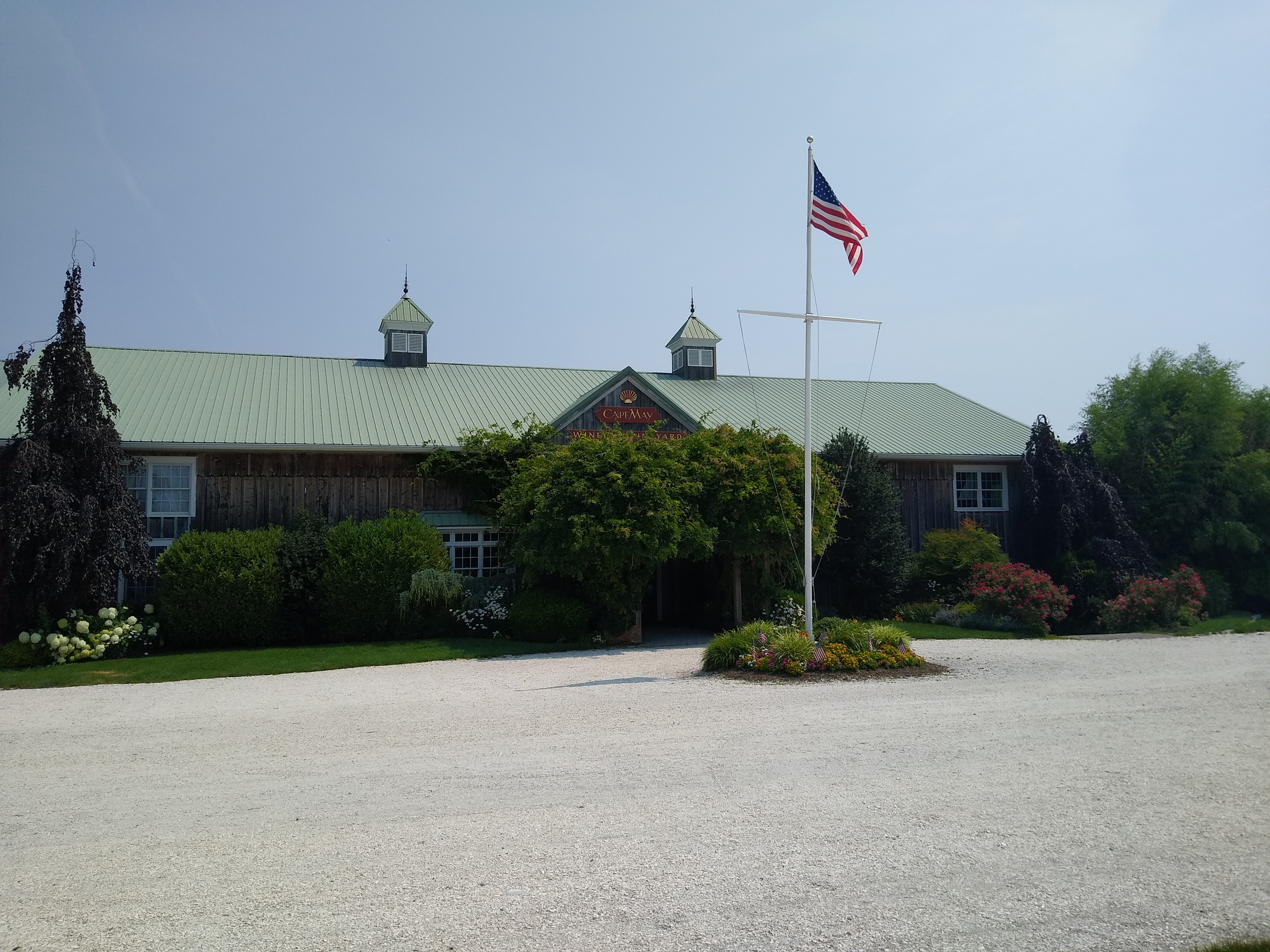
- Location: 711 Town Bank Road, North Cape May, NJ, USA
- Coordinates: 38.973142 N, 74.923559 W
- Appellation: Outer Coastal Plain AVA
- Other labels: Isaac Smith
- First vines planted: 1992
- Opened to the public: 1995
- Key people: Bill & Joan Hayes (founders); Arthur "Toby" Craig (owner); Michael Mitchell (winemaker)
- Acres cultivated: 25
- Cases/yr: 11,000 (2013)
- Other attractions: Picnicking permitted, pet-friendly
- Distribution: On-site, wine festivals, NJ restaurants, home shipment
- Tasting: Daily tastings, tours on Saturday (daily in summer)
- Website: http://www.capemaywinery.com

Cape May Winery & Vineyard is a winery in Lower Township in Cape May County, New Jersey. It is outside of the North Cape May census-designated place, though sometimes its address is stated as a "North Cape May" address. Patriot-News described it as being in North Cape May.

The vineyard was first planted in 1992, and opened to the public in 1995. Cape May Winery is one of the larger winegrowers in New Jersey, having 25 acres of grapes under cultivation, and producing 11,000 cases of wine per year. The winery is named for the region where it is located.

== Wines ==
Cape May Winery is in the Outer Coastal Plain AVA, and produces wine from Albariño, Cabernet Franc, Cabernet Sauvignon, Cayuga White, Chambourcin, Chardonnay, Colombard, Merlot, Pinot gris, Pinot noir, Riesling, Sauvignon blanc, Syrah, Vidal blanc, Viognier, and Zinfandel grapes. Cape May Winery also produces wine from apples, and has a separate brand named "Issac Smith" after an 1820s coffin maker who lived by where the winery currently operates.

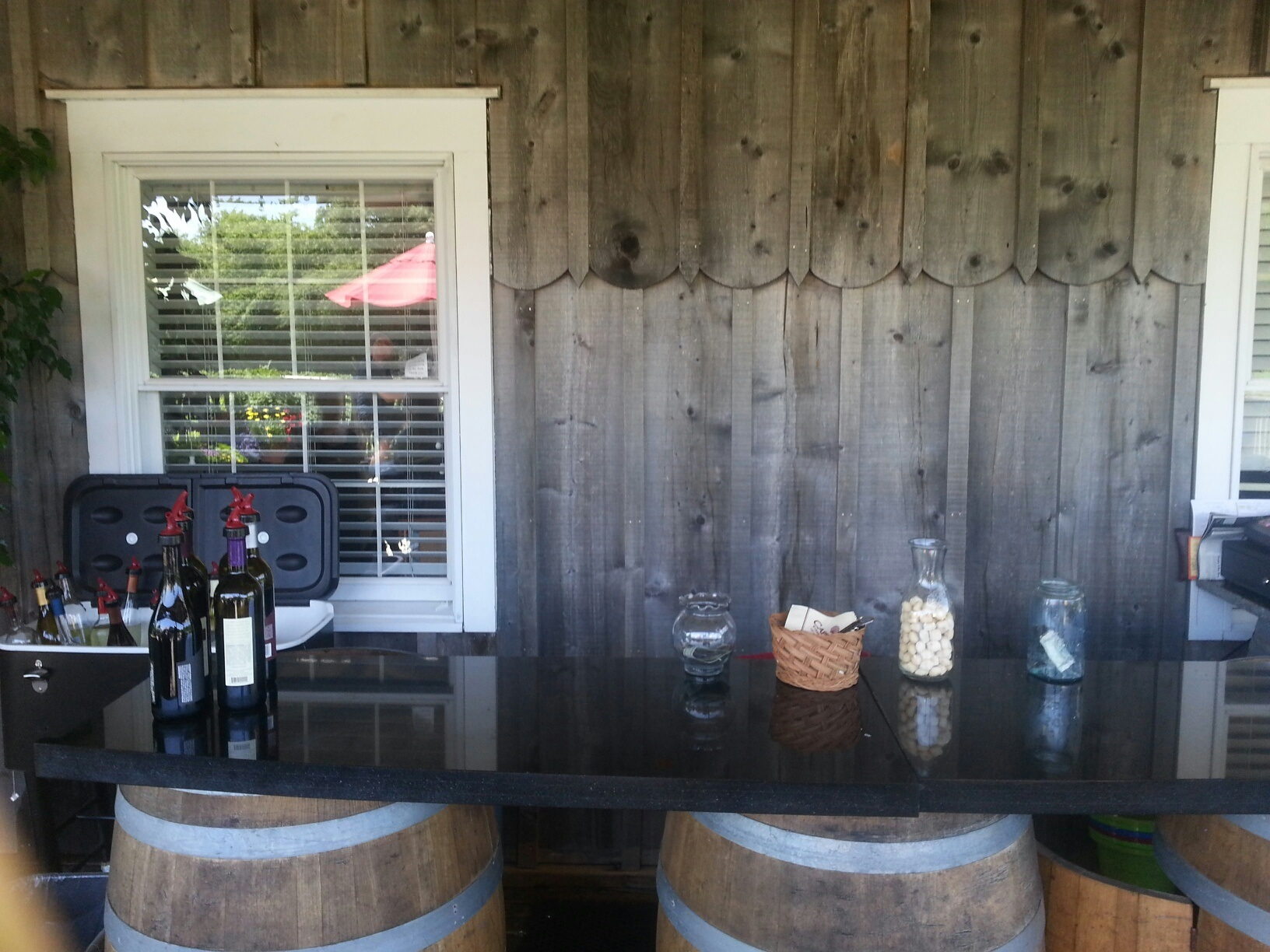
Cape May Winery has a deck with an outdoor tasting bar.

== Licensing and associations ==
Cape May Winery has a plenary winery license from the New Jersey Division of Alcoholic Beverage Control, which allows it to produce an unrestricted amount of wine, operate up to 15 off-premises sales rooms, and ship up to 12 cases per year to consumers in-state or out-of-state. The winery is a member of the Garden State Wine Growers Association and the Outer Coastal Plain Vineyard Association.

== See also ==
- Alcohol laws of New Jersey
- American wine
- Judgment of Princeton
- List of wineries, breweries, and distilleries in New Jersey
- New Jersey Farm Winery Act
- New Jersey Wine Industry Advisory Council
- New Jersey wine
