= Kiptopeke State Park =

State park in Virginia, USA

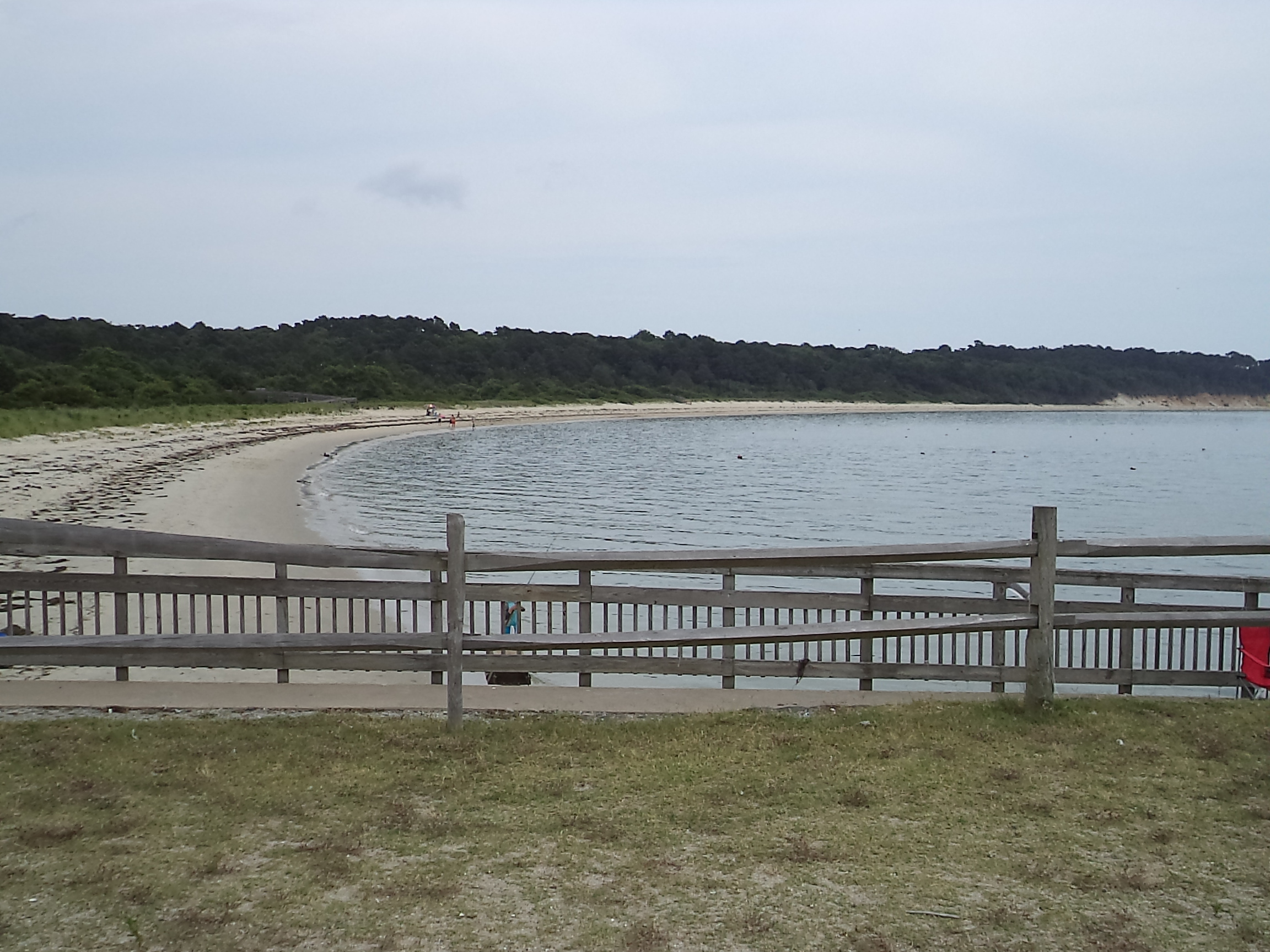
- Beach and ocean at Kiptopeke State Park

- Location within Virginia Location within the United States
- Nearest city: Cape Charles, Virginia
- Coordinates: 37°10′9″N 75°58′45″W
- Area: 562 acres (2.27 km^{2})
- Established: 1992
- Governing body: Virginia Department of Conservation and Recreation

Kiptopeke State Park is a state park located in the southern end of the Eastern Shore of Virginia and the Delmarva Peninsula in Northampton County, near Cape Charles. The park offers recreational access to the brackish waters of the Chesapeake Bay with its shoreline, beach, boat ramps and piers, as well as unique migratory bird habitat along the East Coast flyway. It is also known for the concrete ships sunk to protect the former ferry port from erosion during severe storms.

== History ==
Native Americans lived on the Eastern Shore before English colonists arrived in the 17th century. Captain John Smith, who made several historic voyages around Chesapeake Bay, visited this area in 1608 and in 1612 published a book in which he mentioned two major indigenous villages on what became known as Virginia's Eastern Shore. One was ruled by Kiptopeke, and the other by his younger brother, Esmy Shichans, sometimes known as the "Laughing King", who lived somewhat to the north at Occohannock (Aquohanock). The Virginia Company's secretary, John Pory wrote that Kiptopeke preferred to serve as his younger brother's lieutenant, as well as on the tribal council.

Ferries to the Hampton Roads area traveled from Cape Charles since the colonial era.

By 1949, the Virginia Ferry Corporation owned the property, which it continued to use through 1964 as the northern terminus for the Little Creek-Cape Charles Ferry service which crossed the lower Chesapeake Bay from the Eastern Shore / Delmarva to Norfolk and Hampton Roads harbor on the Western Shore. In 1964, the Chesapeake Bay Bridge-Tunnel replaced the ferry, as a more convenient (although expensive) method for automobile traffic between the Eastern Shore (and the Delmarva peninsula) and urban centers, including the Hampton Roads region in Virginia (especially Norfolk and Virginia Beach), as well as North Carolina.

Sometime after 1968, John Maddox purchased the ferry terminal and ran a campground there. Unable to get a loan to develop the land he agreed to sell it to state for $7.5 million, half of its appraised value, in 1992 so they could create a state park. It was the state's first on the Eastern Shore, the first new one in 20 years and the first with a beach on the Chesapeake. It opened as Kitopeke State Park on June 1, 1992. The terminal building on the pier originally served as an education and concessions building, but by 2002 it was razed.

== Amenities ==
The 562-acre park offers 5.1 miles of biking and hiking trails, as well as water access via several boat launching ramps. The beach is not lifeguard protected, and open with additional fees and services Memorial Day through Labor Day. The lighted fishing pier is open year-round (24 hours April through December), and requires a state fishing license. Although visitor center programs vary by season, and kayak rentals and the camp store and bathhouse are only open seasonally, the campground is open nearly year-round (except for posted wildlife control events). Modern recreational amenities include "yurts" which are half tent, half cabin. Five new cabins sleep up to 16 people;, group camping and camping trailers are also reserveable. However, potable water supplies are limited, and the campground's recreational vehicle sites only now offer electric and water service (not sewer). While the camp store is closed, access to shopping and supplies is in the commercial district of the nearby town of Cape Charles, or across the toll bridge.

== See also ==
- List of Virginia state parks
