= SS Pocahontas =

A number of steamships have been named Pocahontas, including:

- SS Pocahontas (1900), an ocean liner in service 1920–22
- SS Pocahontas (1941), served under Virginia Ferry Corporation's Cape Charles—Little Creek ferry service; sold 1963 and renamed SS Delaware operating as Cape May–Lewes Ferry 1964 to 1974
- SS Pocahontas (1942), a Liberty ship in service 1942–60
