= U.S. Route 13 =

Highway in the United States

U.S. Route 13
- US 13 highlighted in red

Route information
- Length: 517.81 mi (833.33 km)
- Existed: 1926–present

Major junctions
- South end: I-95 / I-295 near Fayetteville, NC
- I-42 in Goldsboro, NC; US 64 near Bethel, NC; US 17 near Williamston, NC; I-64 in Norfolk, VA; US 113 in Pocomoke City, MD; US 50 near Salisbury, MD; US 9 in Laurel, DE; I-295 / US 40 near Wilmington, DE; I-76 / US 30 in Philadelphia, PA; I-95 / Penna Turnpike near Bristol, PA
- North end: US 1 in Falls Township, PA

Location
- Country: United States
- States: North Carolina, Virginia, Maryland, Delaware, Pennsylvania

Highway system
- United States Numbered Highway System; List; Special; Divided
| ← US 12 | → US 14 |

U.S. Route 13 or U.S. Highway 13 (US 13) is a north–south United States Numbered Highway established in 1926 that runs for 518 miles (834 km) from Interstate 95 (I-95) just north of Fayetteville, North Carolina, to US 1 in the northeastern suburbs of Philadelphia, Pennsylvania, near Morrisville. In all, it traverses five states in the Atlantic coastal plain region. It follows the Atlantic coast more closely than does the main north–south U.S. Highway of the region, US 1. Because of this, its number is out of place on the general U.S. Highway numbering grid, as it should be running west of US 11 but does not. Its routing is largely rural, the notable exceptions being the Hampton Roads area in Virginia and the northern end of the highway in Delaware and Pennsylvania. It is also notable for being the main thoroughfare for the Delmarva Peninsula and carrying the Chesapeake Bay Bridge–Tunnel to it in Virginia.

US 13's original plan in 1926 had the route serve no further south than the Delmarva Peninsula. However, it has been extended many times, connecting to the mainland via ferry service and eventually reaching North Carolina. This link across the mouth of the Chesapeake Bay became fixed in 1964 with a bridge–tunnel. The entire route on the Delmarva Peninsula, except for a few sections in Accomack County, Virginia, has been dualized fully with four lanes, and further upgrades continue, such as a freeway section around the east side of Salisbury, Maryland.

== Route description ==
Lengths
| | mi | km |
|---|---|---|
| NC | 185.52 | 298.57 |
| VA | 137.45 | 221.20 |
| MD | 42.01 | 67.61 |
| DE | 103.33 | 166.29 |
| PA | 49.50 | 79.66 |
| Total | 517.81 | 833.33 |

=== North Carolina ===
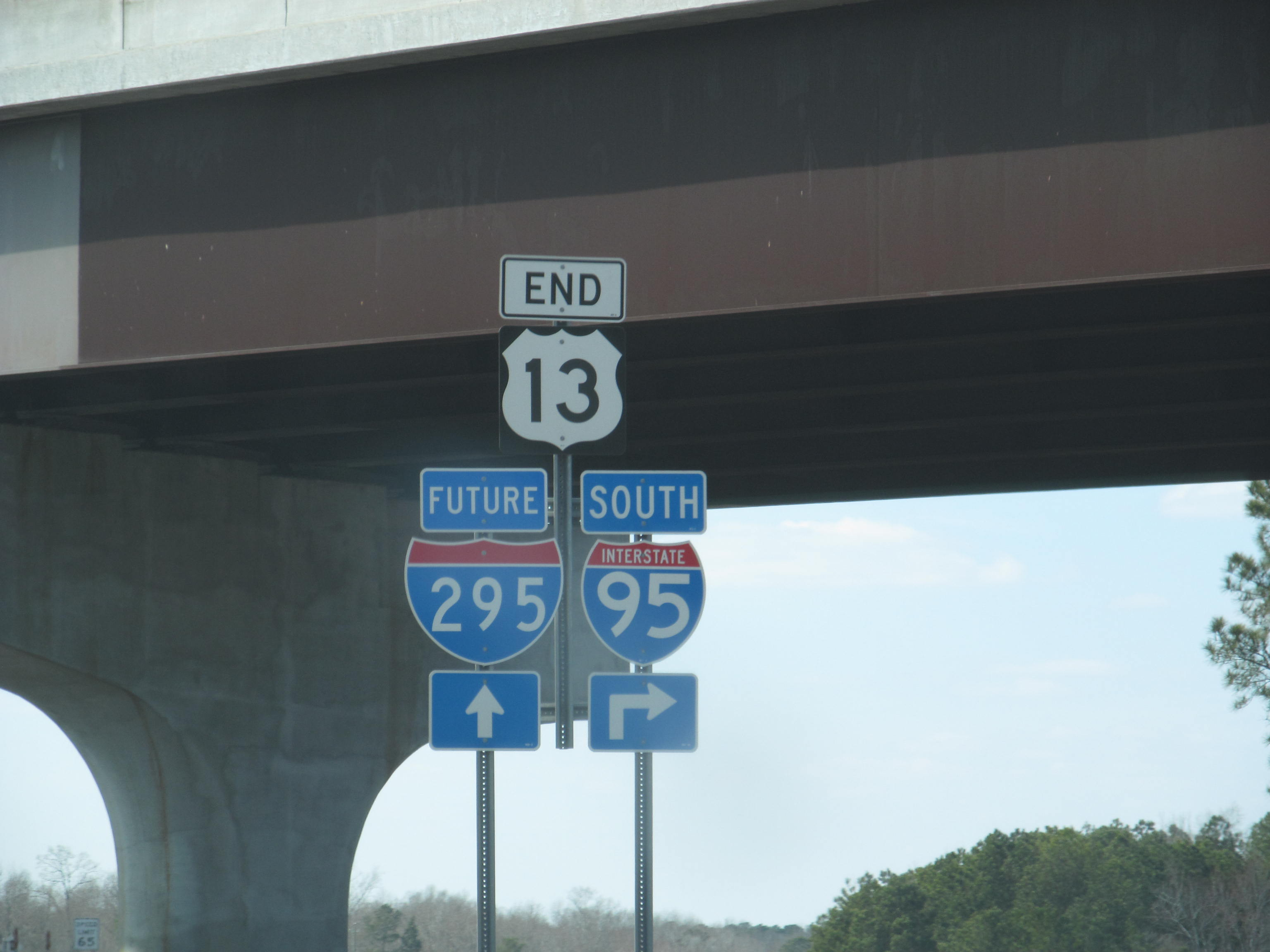
Southern terminus at I-95/I-295 near Fayetteville, North Carolina

US 13 runs southwest to northeast through the eastern part of North Carolina. It begins at I-95 near Fayetteville as a continuation of I-295 (Fayetteville Outer Loop) and heads northeast, intersecting US 421 in Spivey's Corner and US 701 in Newton Grove. It passes over I-40 without an interchange; access is provided via US 701 or North Carolina Highway 50 (NC 50). It then passes through the city of Goldsboro, where it intersects US 70 and US 117. US 13 continues northeast and shares a brief concurrency with US 264 before passing through the city of Greenville. US 13 then heads north from Greenville, following the limited-access US 64 east between Bethel and Williamston and US 17 north between Williamston and Windsor. US 13 then heads north from Windsor toward Ahoskie and intersects with NC 11. It then crosses US 158 in Gates County before crossing the state line with Virginia.

=== Virginia ===
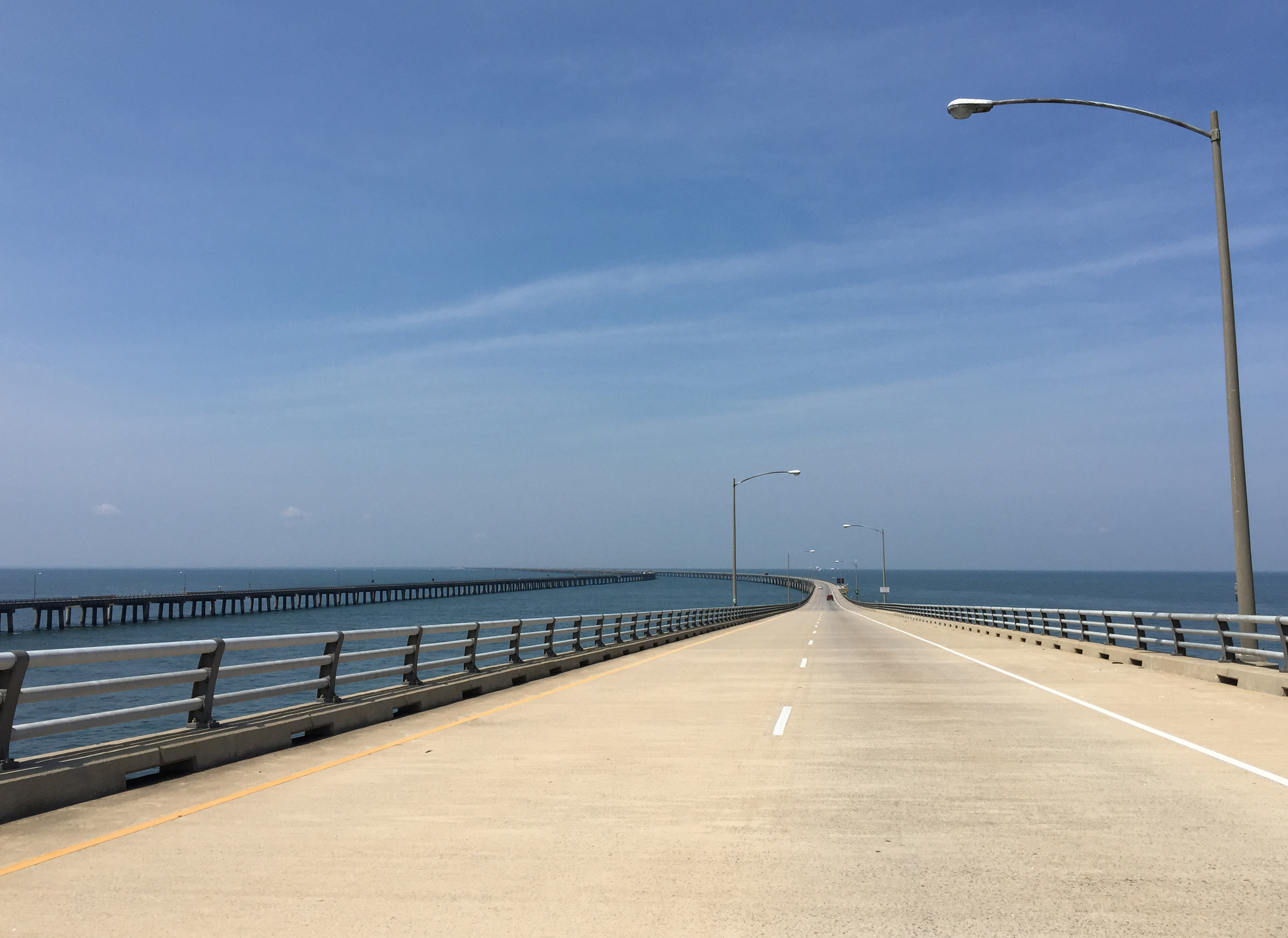
The Chesapeake Bay Bridge–Tunnel carries US 13 across the Chesapeake Bay

US 13 continues north, expanding to four lanes near Suffolk and diverges onto the Suffolk Bypass where it joins US 58 and US 460. Here, one of the many business routes of US 13 passes straight through the city as the bypass passes the city to the west. It continues through the Hampton Roads area on the Military Highway and continues north to the Chesapeake Bay Bridge–Tunnel, which the route uses to continue across the Chesapeake Bay to the Eastern Shore of Virginia. Here, US 13 is the main north–south route of the region and connects to most cities and towns with four more business routes forming loops off the highway. North of New Church, US 13 crosses the state border into Maryland.

=== Maryland ===
US 13 passes through the lower Eastern Shore region of Maryland. It runs through Pocomoke City in Worcester County, where it meets the southern terminus of US 113. It continues north into Somerset County, where it passes through the town of Princess Anne. It then enters Wicomico County, where it bypasses the cities of Salisbury and Fruitland to the east on the limited-access Salisbury Bypass, with the former alignment signed as US 13 Business (US 13 Bus.). On the northeastern part of the bypass, US 13 is concurrent with US 50, which bypasses Salisbury to the north. North of Salisbury, US 13 continues to the state line town of Delmar.

=== Delaware ===
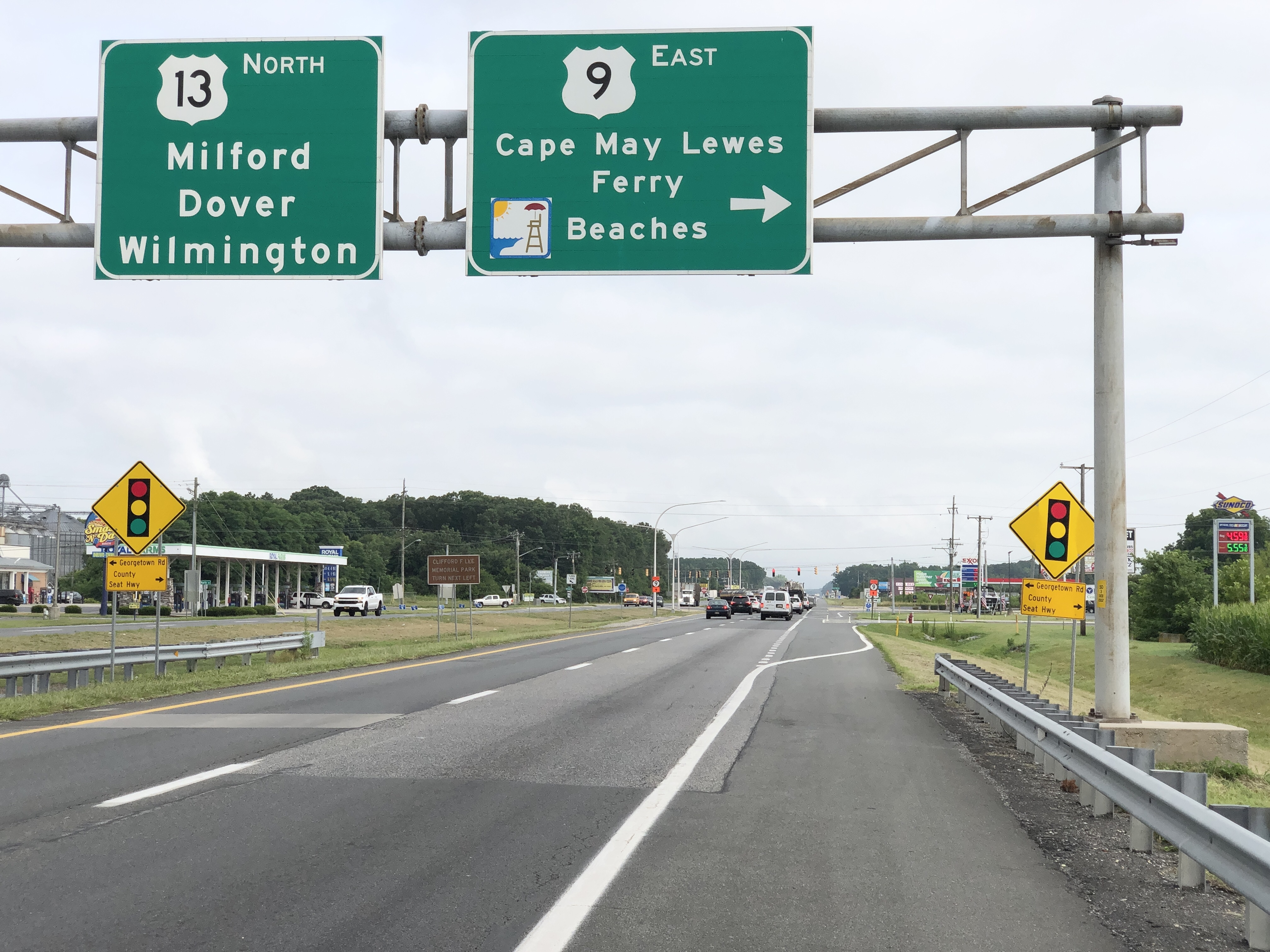
US 13 northbound at western terminus of US 9 in Laurel, Delaware

US 13 runs through the entire north–south length of Delaware. It enters the state in Delmar and runs through western Sussex County, intersecting the western terminus of US 9 in Laurel and passing through the city of Seaford. It continues into Kent County and heads north toward the state capital of Dover. US 13 forms the commercial district of the city of Dover. Between Dover and Wilmington in New Castle County, US 13 is paralleled by the Delaware Route 1 (DE 1) freeway, portions of which are a toll road. It crosses the Chesapeake & Delaware Canal on the St. Georges Bridge. US 13 continues toward Wilmington, sharing a concurrency with US 40 in the New Castle area. It bypasses the heart of Wilmington to the east, with US 13 Bus. passing through the downtown area. US 13 parallels I-495 between Wilmington and the Pennsylvania border.

=== Pennsylvania ===
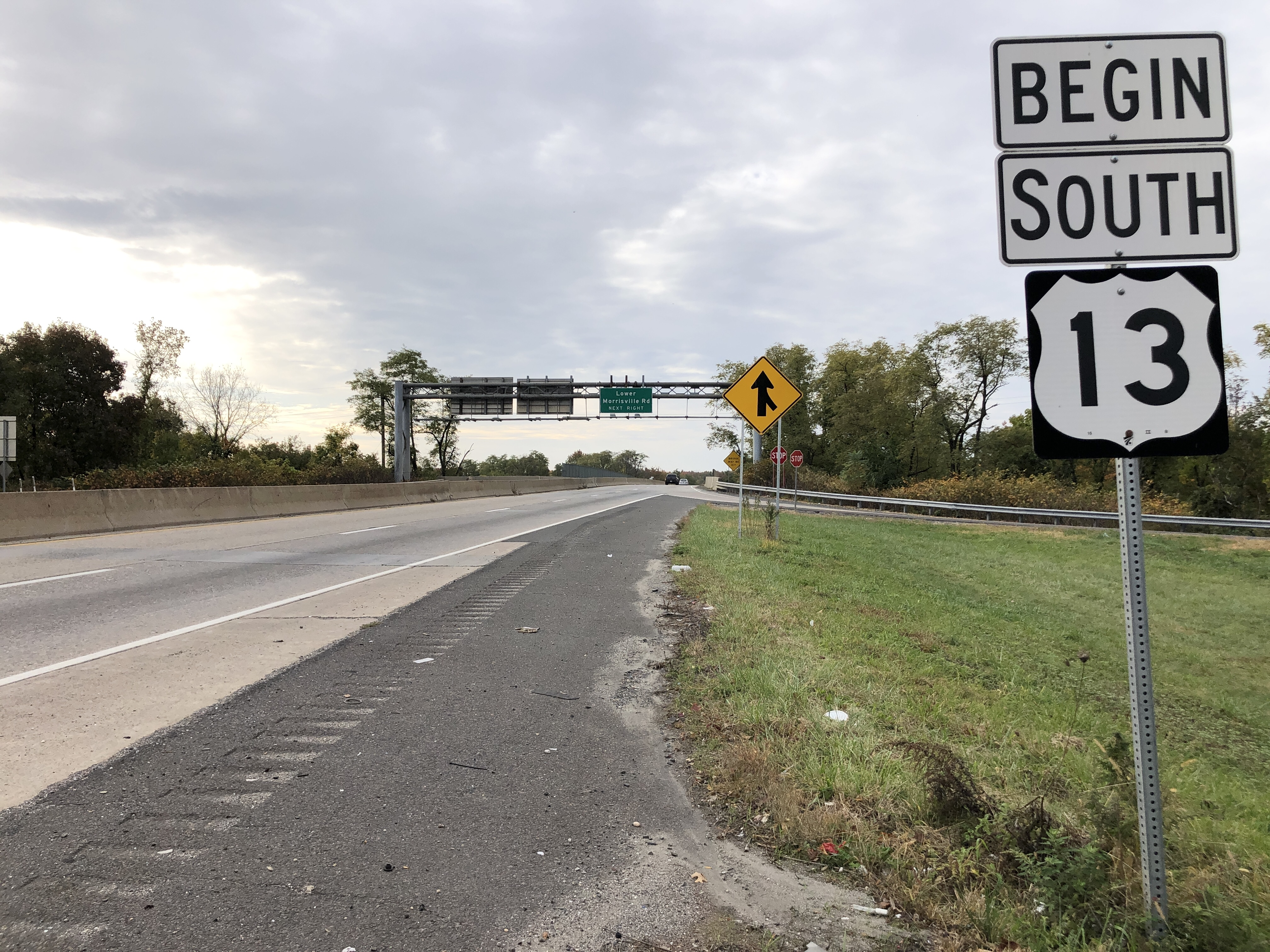
Beginning of US 13 southbound at US 1 near Morrisville, Pennsylvania

Upon entering the commonwealth of Pennsylvania from Delaware, US 13 runs along the banks of the Delaware River parallel to I-95 through Delaware County. It then runs a southwest to northeast path through the city of Philadelphia. It traverses West Philadelphia on many one-way pairs and then passes by the Philadelphia Zoo. US 13 then runs through North Philadelphia and Northeast Philadelphia by following Hunting Park Avenue, the Roosevelt Boulevard (which is also US 1), and Frankford Avenue, where it crosses Pennypack Creek on the oldest bridge in the U.S. US 13 then enters Bucks County, again closely following I-95, the Delaware River and US 1. US 13 ends after an interchange with US 1 near Morrisville in Falls Township. The road continues north toward Yardley as Pine Grove Road.

== History ==
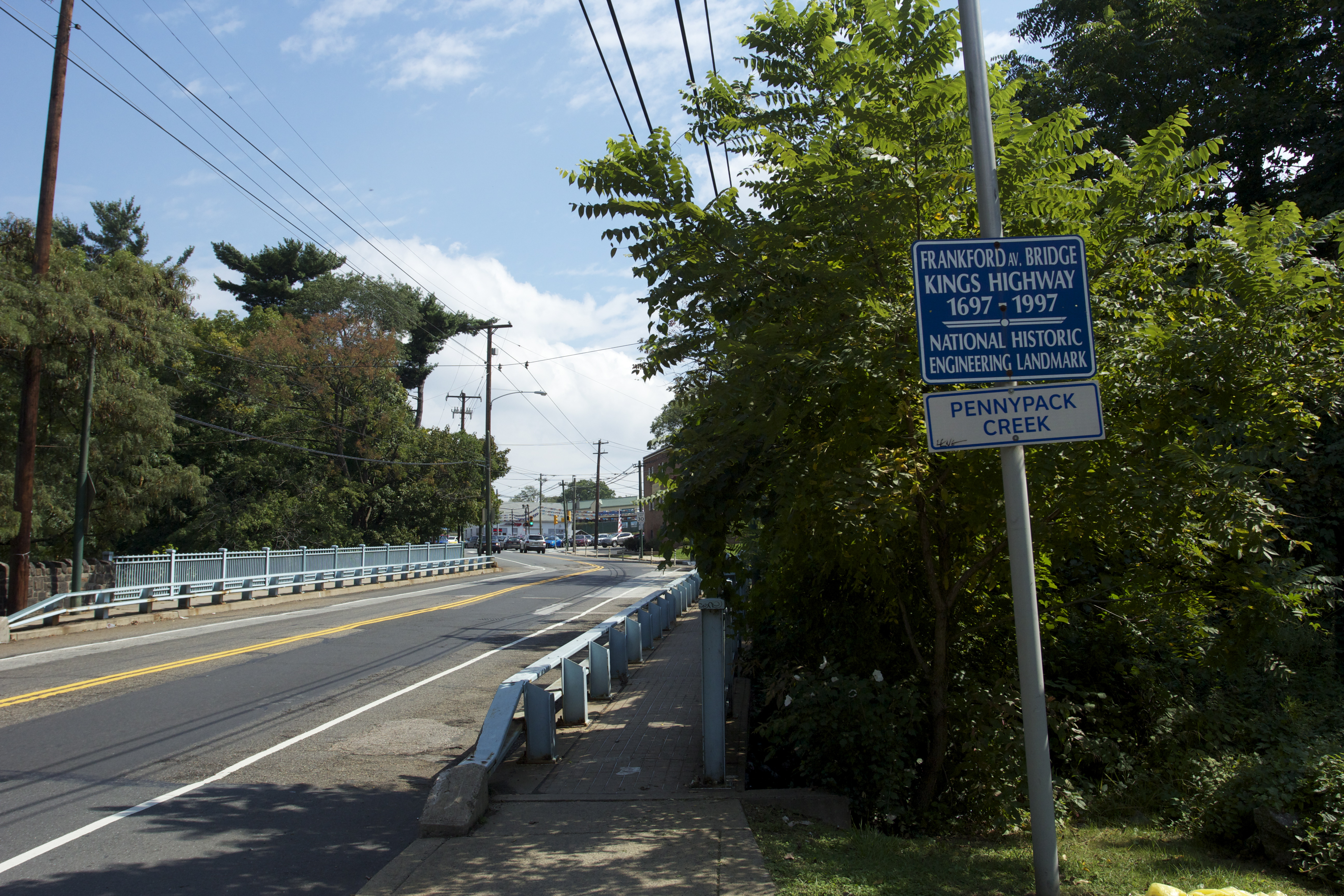
US 13 crosses Pennypack Creek via the Frankford Avenue Bridge, the oldest bridge in the U.S., built 1697.

The original 1925 U.S. Highway plan, which never came to fruition, had provision for a US 13 in North Carolina. It would have started in Wilmington and run at least as far north as Elizabeth City, following what would become US 17. Although US 13 was signed in most northern states by the late 1920s, it would not reach North Carolina until the early 1950s.

The route was proposed as one of the first four-lane highways in the U.S. to Pierre S. du Pont by John J. Raskob so as to run from Wilmington, Delaware, to the state capital, Dover. Du Pont wanted a two-lane highway—the standard at the time, but Raskob suggested that with the growth and development of northern Delaware, there would be a future need for a four-lane one. Du Pont agreed and, to honor Raskob for his insight, sought to name the route after him. However, Raskob declined.

== Major intersections ==
North Carolina
I-295 in Eastover
I-95 in Eastover
US 421 in Spivey's Corner
US 701 in Newton Grove
US 117 in Mar-Mac. The highways travel concurrently to Goldsboro.
US 70 in Goldsboro. The highways travel concurrently through the city.
I-42 in Goldsboro
US 258 north of Snow Hill. The highways travel concurrently to south-southwest of Farmville.
US 264 in Greenville
US 64 north of Bethel. The highways travel concurrently to south-southeast of Williamston.
US 17 south of Williamston. The highways travel concurrently to Windsor.
US 158 northwest of Winton. The highways travel concurrently to northeast of Winton.
Virginia
US 58 in Suffolk. The highways travel concurrently to Chesapeake.
US 460 in Suffolk. The highways travel concurrently to Chesapeake.
I-664 in Chesapeake. The highways travel concurrently for approximately 0.4 miles (0.64 km).
I-64 in Chesapeake
US 17 in Chesapeake
I-464 in Chesapeake
I-264 in Norfolk
US 58 in Norfolk
I-64 in Norfolk
US 60 in Virginia Beach
Maryland
US 113 in Pocomoke City
US 50 in Salisbury. The highways travel concurrently around the city.
Delaware
US 9 northeast of Laurel
US 40 in State Road. The highways travel concurrently to Wilmington Manor.
US 202 in Wilmington Manor
I-295 / US 40 in Wilmington Manor
I-495 south of Wilmington
I-495 in Claymont
Pennsylvania
US 322 in Chester
I-76 / US 30 in Philadelphia
US 1 in Philadelphia. The highways travel concurrently through the city.
I-95 in Bristol Township
US 1 in Falls Township
Pine Grove Road in Falls Township

== See also ==
=== Auxiliary routes ===
- U.S. Route 113, the only surviving spur route of US 13
- U.S. Route 213, replaced by US 50 and MD 213

=== Special routes ===
Browse numbered routes
| ← NC 12 | NC | → NC 14 |
| ← US 11 | VA | → SR 13 |
| ← MD 12 | MD | → MD 14 |
| ← DE 12 | DE | → DE 14 |
| ← PA 12 | PA | → PA 14 |
