= North Cape May, New Jersey =

Populated place in Cape May County, New Jersey, US

- Census-designated place
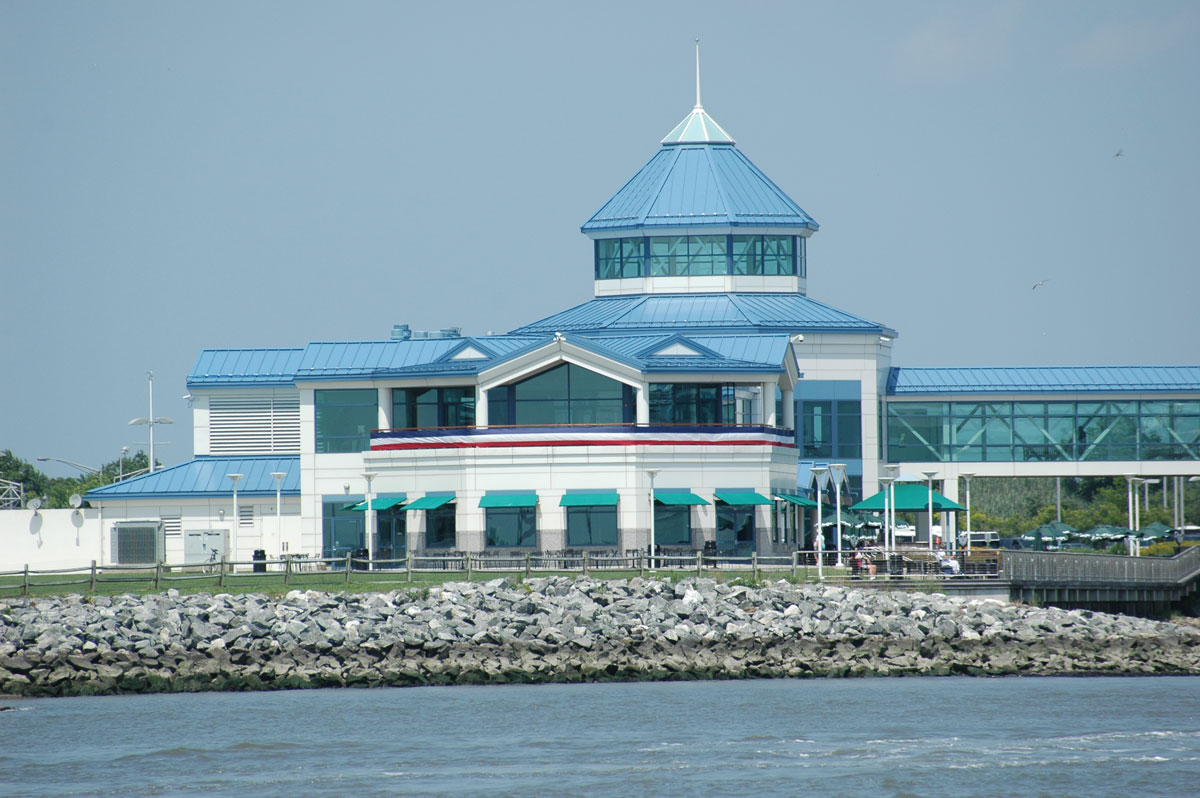
- Cape May terminal building serving the Cape May–Lewes Ferry

- Location of North Cape May in Cape May County highlighted in red (left). Inset map: Location of Cape May County in New Jersey highlighted in orange (right).

- Location in Cape May County Location in New Jersey Location in the United States
- Coordinates: 38.976427°N 74.951503°W
- Country: United States
- State: New Jersey
- County: Cape May
- Township: Lower

Area
  - Total: 2.14 sq mi (5.53 km^{2})
  - Land: 2.00 sq mi (5.19 km^{2})
  - Water: 0.13 sq mi (0.33 km^{2}) 2.49%
- Elevation: 13 ft (4 m)

Population (2020)
  - Total: 4,007
  - Density: 1,997.8/sq mi (771.34/km^{2})
- Time zone: UTC−05:00 (Eastern (EST))
  - Summer (DST): UTC−04:00 (Eastern (EDT))
- ZIP Code: 08204 - Cape May
- Area code: 609
- FIPS code: 34-52650
- GNIS feature ID: 02389569

North Cape May is an unincorporated community and census-designated place (CDP) located within Lower Township in Cape May County, in the U.S. state of New Jersey. It is part of the Ocean City Metropolitan Statistical Area. As of the 2020 census, North Cape May had a population of 4,007. The Cape May–Lewes Ferry departs from the area. North Cape May is mostly a residential community, with no hotels but many vacation homes. Many people retire to the community.

North Cape May had existed as an independent borough, formed by an act of the New Jersey Legislature on March 19, 1928, from portions of Lower Township. The borough remained independent until April 30, 1945, when it was returned to Lower Township. The borough had a population of 5 at the 1930 Census, which increased to 8 by 1940.

== Geography ==
According to the United States Census Bureau, the CDP had a total area of 1.494 square miles (3.87 km^{2}), including 1.457 square miles (3.77 km^{2}) of land and 0.037 square miles (0.096 km^{2}) of water (2.49%).

== Demographics ==
Historical population
Census	Pop.	Note	%±
1970	3,812		—
1980	4,029		5.7%
1990	3,574		−11.3%
2000	3,618		1.2%
2010	3,226		−10.8%
2020	4,007		24.2%
Population sources: 1970-1980; 1950 1960 1970; 1980 1990 2000; 2010 2020

North Cape May first appeared as an unincorporated community in the 1970 U.S. census; and then was listed as a census designated place in the 1980 U.S. census.

=== Racial and ethnic composition ===
North Cape May CDP, New Jersey – Racial and ethnic composition Note: the US Census treats Hispanic/Latino as an ethnic category. This table excludes Latinos from the racial categories and assigns them to a separate category. Hispanics/Latinos may be of any race.
Race / Ethnicity (NH = Non-Hispanic)	Pop 2000	Pop 2010	Pop 2020	% 2000	% 2010	% 2020
White alone (NH)	3,377	2,949	3,545	93.34%	91.41%	88.47%
Black or African American alone (NH)	99	85	82	2.74%	2.63%	2.05%
Native American or Alaska Native alone (NH)	16	11	6	0.44%	0.34%	0.15%
Asian alone (NH)	17	18	35	0.47%	0.56%	0.87%
Native Hawaiian or Pacific Islander alone (NH)	0	0	1	0.00%	0.00%	0.02%
Other race alone (NH)	2	2	2	0.06%	0.06%	0.05%
Mixed race or Multiracial (NH)	29	43	128	0.80%	1.33%	3.19%
Hispanic or Latino (any race)	78	118	208	2.16%	3.66%	5.19%
Total	3,618	3,226	4,007	100.00%	100.00%	100.00%

=== 2020 census ===
As of the 2020 census, North Cape May had a population of 4,007. The median age was 55.0 years. 13.5% of residents were under the age of 18 and 30.7% of residents were 65 years of age or older. For every 100 females, there were 93.9 males, and for every 100 females age 18 and older, there were 91.6 males.

99.6% of residents lived in urban areas, while 0.4% lived in rural areas.

There were 1,818 households in North Cape May, of which 18.2% had children under the age of 18 living in them. Of all households, 46.6% were married-couple households, 17.0% were households with a male householder and no spouse or partner present, and 30.2% were households with a female householder and no spouse or partner present. About 31.8% of all households were made up of individuals and 18.3% had someone living alone who was 65 years of age or older.

There were 3,104 housing units, of which 41.4% were vacant. The homeowner vacancy rate was 1.0% and the rental vacancy rate was 10.5%.

=== 2010 census ===
The 2010 United States census counted 3,226 people, 1,395 households, and 896 families in the CDP. The population density was 2,214.3 people per square mile (854.9 people/km^{2}). There were 2,100 housing units at an average density of 1,441.5 units per square mile (556.6 units/km^{2}). The racial makeup was 92.87% (2,996) White, 3.22% (104) Black or African American, 0.34% (11) Native American, 0.59% (19) Asian, 0.00% (0) Pacific Islander, 1.30% (42) from other races, and 1.67% (54) from two or more races. Hispanic or Latino of any race were 3.66% (118) of the population.

Of the 1,395 households, 20.7% had children under the age of 18; 47.2% were married couples living together; 13.3% had a female householder with no husband present and 35.8% were non-families. Of all households, 29.6% were made up of individuals and 15.2% had someone living alone who was 65 years of age or older. The average household size was 2.30 and the average family size was 2.82.

18.2% of the population were under the age of 18, 7.7% from 18 to 24, 19.9% from 25 to 44, 31.8% from 45 to 64, and 22.3% who were 65 years of age or older. The median age was 47.6 years. For every 100 females, the population had 88.2 males. For every 100 females ages 18 and older there were 86.6 males.

=== 2000 census ===
As of the 2000 United States census there were 3,618 people, 1,544 households, and 1,008 families residing in the CDP. The population density was 997.8 people/km^{2} (2,584 people/mi^{2}). There were 2,090 housing units at an average density of 576.4 units/km^{2} (1,493 units/mi^{2}). The racial makeup of the CDP was 94.42% White, 2.79% African American, 0.44% Native American, 0.47% Asian, 0.75% from other races, and 1.13% from two or more races. Hispanic or Latino of any race were 2.16% of the population.

There were 1,544 households, out of which 27.0% had children under the age of 18 living with them, 48.1% were married couples living together, 13.7% had a female householder with no husband present, and 34.7% were non-families. 29.6% of all households were made up of individuals, and 15.5% had someone living alone who was 65 years of age or older. The average household size was 2.33 and the average family size was 2.88.

In the CDP the population was spread out, with 22.8% under the age of 18, 6.0% from 18 to 24, 26.3% from 25 to 44, 24.2% from 45 to 64, and 20.7% who were 65 years of age or older. The median age was 42 years. For every 100 females, there were 86.7 males. For every 100 females age 18 and over, there were 81.3 males.

The median income for a household in the CDP was $37,071, and the median income for a family was $42,161. Males had a median income of $33,036 versus $26,875 for females. The per capita income for the CDP was $18,420. About 1.0% of families and 4.1% of the population were below the poverty line, including 3.1% of those under age 18 and 3.0% of those age 65 or over.

== Wineries ==
- Cape May Winery & Vineyard
- Turdo Vineyards & Winery

== Parks and recreation ==
Lower Township maintains the David Douglass Memorial Park (Canal Park), Mindy Park, and Lower Township Community Pool in North Cape May. North Cape May is the site of the Lower Township municipal pool.

== Education ==
As with other parts of Lower Township, it is served by Lower Township School District for primary grades and Lower Cape May Regional School District for secondary grades.

David C. Douglass Memorial Elementary School (Pre-Kindergarten and Kindergarten) is in Villas CDP. The other three elementary schools are in Cold Spring: Carl T. Mitnick (grades 1–2), Maud Abrams (grades 3–4), and Sandman Consolidated (grades 5–6). The LCMR schools (Richard Teitelman Middle and Lower Cape May Regional High School) are in the Erma area.

Students are also eligible to attend Cape May County Technical High School in Cape May Court House, which serves students from the entire county in its comprehensive and vocational programs, which are offered without charge to students who are county residents. Special needs students may be referred to Cape May County Special Services School District in Cape May Court House.

South Cape Christian Academy, a private Christian school, opened sometime after 1976, and was located in a campus with a North Cape May postal address; as of 2010 it was outside of the North Cape May CDP. Circa 1990 it merged into Cape Christian Academy, which is now in a consolidated campus in Middle Township, with a Cape May Court House postal address and located in the CMCH CDP. Richard Degener of the Press of Atlantic City described the consolidated campus as being in Burleigh.

The nearest private Catholic school serving North Cape May is Wildwood Catholic Academy (PreK-12) in North Wildwood, which the Roman Catholic Diocese of Camden has under its supervision. Previously the area Catholic school was Our Lady Star of the Sea School in Cape May, which served as the parish school for St. John of God Church in North Cape May. In 2010 Our Lady Star of the Sea merged into Cape Trinity Regional School (PreK – 8) in North Wildwood. That school in turn merged into Wildwood Catholic Academy in 2020.

== Religion ==
St. John Neumann Catholic Parish, of the Roman Catholic Diocese of Camden has its primary worship site in North Cape May. Previously it was a standalone church, St. John of God Church. In 2008 the diocese announced that it would merge with St. Raymond Church of Villas, and the merger occurred in 2010.

== Notable people ==
People who were born in, residents of, or otherwise closely associated with North Cape May include:

- Bob Andrzejczak (born 1986), politician who represented the 1st Legislative District in the New Jersey General Assembly from 2013 to 2019 and in the New Jersey Senate in 2019.
- Chris Jay, (born 1978), musician, screenwriter, actor, member of the band, Army of Freshmen.

== Gallery ==
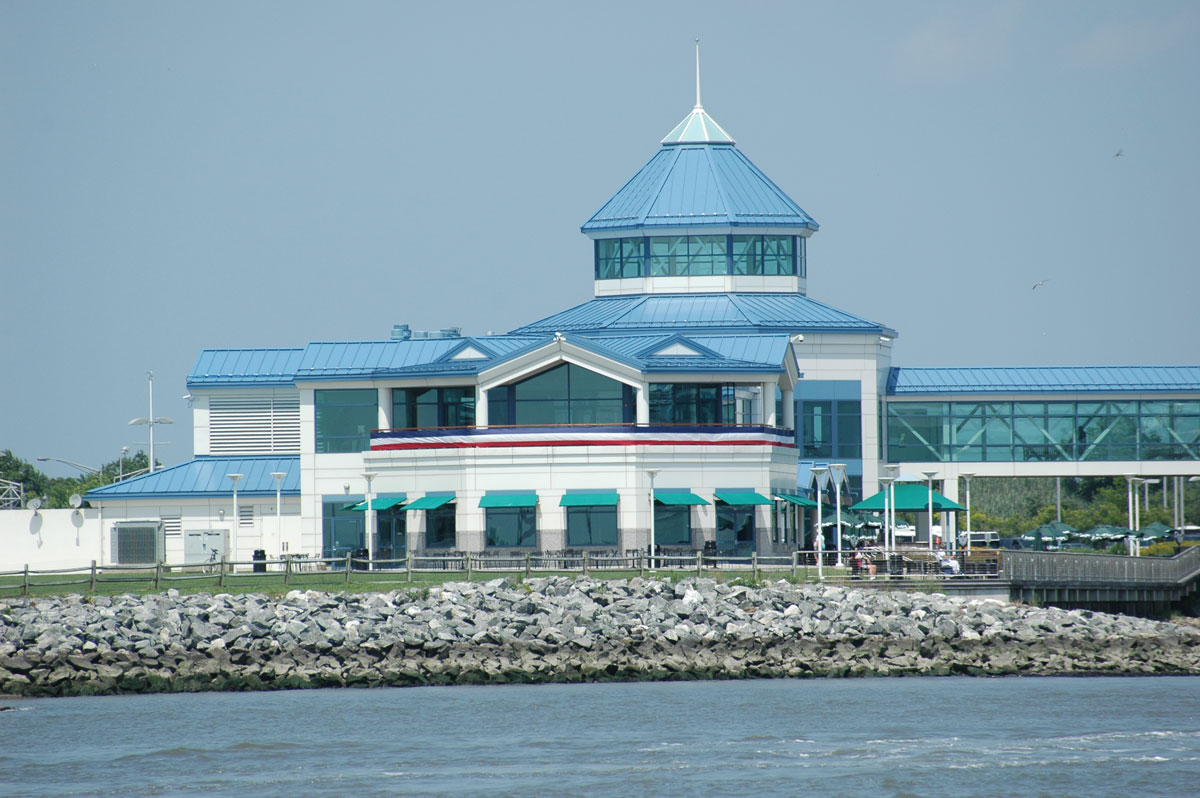
Cape May–Lewes Ferry terminal

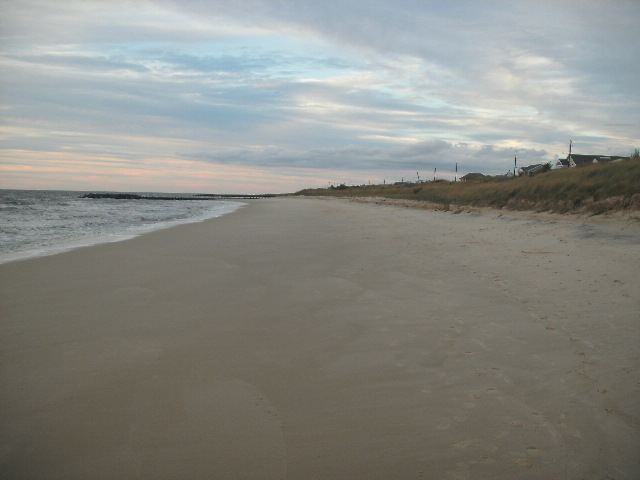
Shoreline near the ferry terminal
