= Kane Brewing =

Craft brewery in Monmouth County, New Jersey

- Type: Craft Brewery
- Location: 1750 Bloomsbury Ave, Ocean Township, New Jersey, USA
- Coordinates: 40.2366°N 74.0449°W
- Opened: 2011; 14 years ago
- Key people: Michael Kane
- Annual production volume: 18,000 barrels a year
- Distribution: On-site
- Tasting: Tastings and tours on Wednesday through Sunday
- Website: https://www.kanebrewing.com/

Kane Brewing is a craft brewery in Ocean Township, Monmouth County, New Jersey. It was started in 2011. It is New Jersey's third-largest craft brewery, after Flying Fish Brewery and River Horse Brewery.

== History ==
Kane Brewing was founded by Michael Kane. He started homebrewing at age 22 in order to recreate a German/Belgian style beer he tasted while on a trip in College. After he won gold and silver medals at the 2009 National Homebrew Competition, he took his hobby more seriously and researched opening a brewery. He took a job at a Wall Street mergers and acquisitions firm, but after four years, he quit to open his own brewery in 2011 in a former casket shop. The following year, New Jersey beer laws were harmonized with those of surrounding states, allowing production limits to increase and giving Kane an opportunity to grow quickly into one of New jersey's biggest breweries.

== See also ==
- Alcohol laws of New Jersey
- Beer in New Jersey
- Beer in the United States
- List of wineries, breweries, and distilleries in New Jersey
