= Ghost Hawk Brewing Company =

US American microbrewery

- Type: Microbrewery
- Location: 321 River Road #6, Clifton, New Jersey, USA
- Opened: 2019
- Key people: Steven Bauer
- Annual production volume: 1,200
- Distribution: On-site
- Tasting: Tastings and tours Tuesday–Sunday
- Website: www.ghosthawkbrewing.com

Ghost Hawk Brewing Company is a microbrewery in Clifton and is the one of two production breweries in Passaic County, New Jersey.

== History ==
Ghost Hawk was started by Clifton natives Thomas Rachelski and Steven Bauer, but it grew to encompass Chris Sheehan, who was the head brewer at Chelsea Craft Brewery and Gun Hill Brewing. The brewery opened April 20, 2019 and was the first production brewery in Passaic County since Paterson Consolidated Brewing Company closed after Prohibition. They came in 2nd place during News 12's 2019 Brewery Battle. In December 2019 the brewery almost shut down when one of the founders suffered from a stroke, but a GoFund me was created and raised $15,000. Currently they produce about 1,200 barrels a year in their 15-barrel brewhouse and is on tap in over 100 different bars and restaurants in northern and central New Jersey.

== Beers and other products ==
Ghost Hawk brews many different beers, but has four Flagship products:

- Ghost Hawk Lager
- Apex Predator New England IPA
- Ravendark Foreign Export Stout
- Daedalion Wheat Beer

== Licensing and associations ==
Ghost Hawk has a limited brewery license from the New Jersey Division of Alcoholic Beverage Control, which allows it to produce up to 300,000 barrels of beer per year, to sell on-premises as part of a tour, and to distribute to wholesalers and at festivals. The brewery is a member of the New Jersey Brewers Association and New Jersey Craft Beer Club.

== See also ==
- Alcohol laws of New Jersey
- Beer in New Jersey
- List of wineries, breweries, and distilleries in New Jersey
