= Artisan's Brewery =

Brewpub in the United States

- Type: Brewpub
- Location: 1171 Hooper Avenue, Toms River, New Jersey, USA
- Coordinates: 39.9767°N 74.1829°W
- Opened: 1997
- Key people: Peter Gregorakis, Petros Gregorakis, Dave Hoffmann
- Annual production volume: 300 US beer barrels (350 hL) in 2006
- Other products: Italian food, cigars
- Distribution: On-site
- Tasting: Tastings daily, tours by appointment
- Website: www.artisanstomsriver.com

Artisan's Brewery is a brewpub in Toms River in Ocean County, New Jersey. The brewery opened to the public in 1997, and was originally known as Basil T's Brew Pub, being a second location for Basil T's Brewery in Red Bank. Artisan's was purchased by new owners in 2001, and assumed its current name in 2010. The brewery produces 300 barrels of beer per year.

== Beers and other products ==
Artisan's Brewery specializes in the production of English, German, and American-style beers. Common beer styles made at the brewery include brown ales, hefeweizens, light ales, maibocks, Märzens (Oktoberfest beers), pilsners, red ales, seasonal beers, weizenbocks, and west coast IPAs, Artisan's also serves Italian food and has a cigar lounge.

== Licensing and associations ==
Artisan's has a restricted brewery license from the New Jersey Division of Alcoholic Beverage Control, which allows it to produce up to 10,000 barrels of beer per year, to sell on-premises, to wholesalers, and at festivals in the state, and to offer samples at off-premises charitable or civic events. The brewery is not a member of the Garden State Craft Brewers Guild.

== See also ==
- Alcohol laws of New Jersey
- Beer in New Jersey
- List of wineries, breweries, and distilleries in New Jersey
