= Flounder Brewing =

Microbrewery in Somerset County, New Jersey

Flounder Brewing Company
- Type: Microbrewery
- Location: 2 Clerico Lane Building 4, Hillsborough, New Jersey, USA
- Coordinates: 40.4905°N 74.6439°W
- Opened: 2013
- Key people: Jeremy "Flounder" Lees, Daniel Lees, Michael Lees, William Jordan V
- Annual production volume: 50 US beer barrels (59 hL) (2013)
- Distribution: On-site
- Tasting: Tastings and tours on select Saturdays
- Website: http://www.flounderbrewing.com/

Flounder Brewing Company is a microbrewery in Hillsborough in Somerset County, New Jersey. Started by Jeremy Lees as a homebrewing hobby, it grew to encompass other members of the family including his brothers, Daniel and Michael, and his cousin William. The brewery opened to the public in October 2013, and was first sold to the public at the Fox and Hound Tavern in Lebanon, New Jersey. It was New Jersey's 12th Limited Brewery license and one of the first nano scale breweries in New Jersey, producing an estimated 50 barrels of beer per year.

In June of 2021 the brewery moved operations to a renovated 250 year old Dutch Barn and 150 year old English Barn. The expansion included adding a 15 barrel brewhouse and now features a 100 person capacity tasting barn with mezzanine as well as two outdoor beer gardens.

== Beers and other products ==
Flounder Brewing best known for its signature Hill Street Honey Ale, an unfiltered American pale ale. Their other year round types are the Murky Brown, an American Brown Ale, and Saison du Flounder, a farmhouse ale. There are currently two seasonal releases in the rotation – Floundering Pumpkin in the fall based, a spiced pumpkin amber ale, and the Gingerbread Brown, a spiced brown winter ale.

== Licensing and associations ==
Flounder has a limited brewery license from the New Jersey Division of Alcoholic Beverage Control, which allows it to produce up to 300,000 barrels of beer per year, to sell on-premises as part of a tour, and to distribute to wholesalers and at festivals. The brewery is a member of the Garden State Craft Brewers Guild and New Jersey Craft Beer Club.

== See also ==
- Alcohol laws of New Jersey
- Beer in New Jersey
- List of wineries, breweries, and distilleries in New Jersey
