= Laird & Company =

Distillery

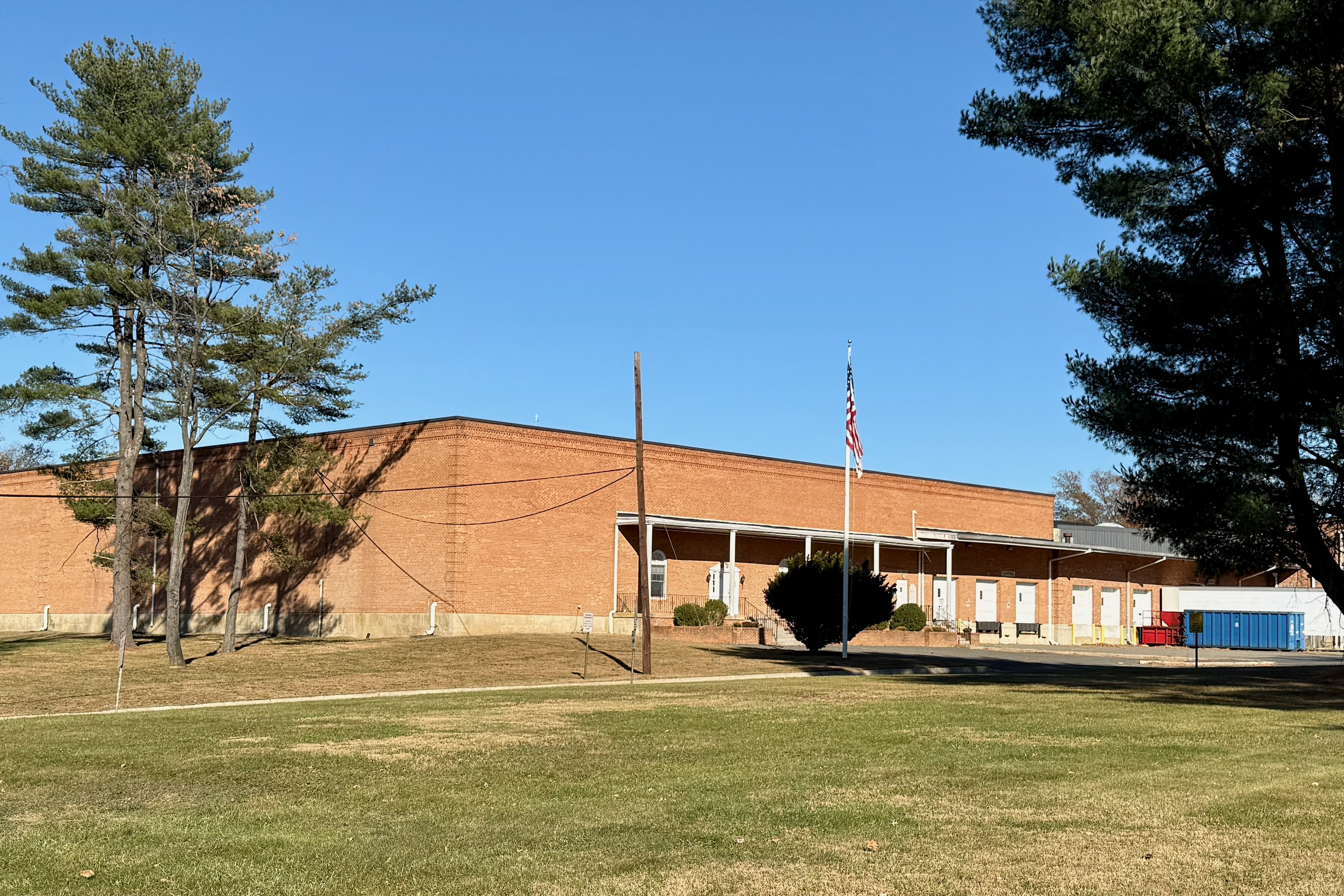
- Current Bottling Plant
- Location: 1 Laird Road, Scobeyville, New Jersey
- Founded: 1780
- Founder: Robert Laird

Laird & Company is a distillery located at 1 Laird Road in the Scobeyville section of Colts Neck Township in Monmouth County, New Jersey, United States. Founded by Robert Laird, it is the oldest licensed distillery in the United States and received License No. 1 from the U.S. Department of the Treasury in 1780. Laird has a rectifier and blender license from the New Jersey Division of Alcoholic Beverage Control.

== History ==
- Laird & Company Distillery Historic District
- U.S. National Register of Historic Places
- U.S. Historic district
- New Jersey Register of Historic Places
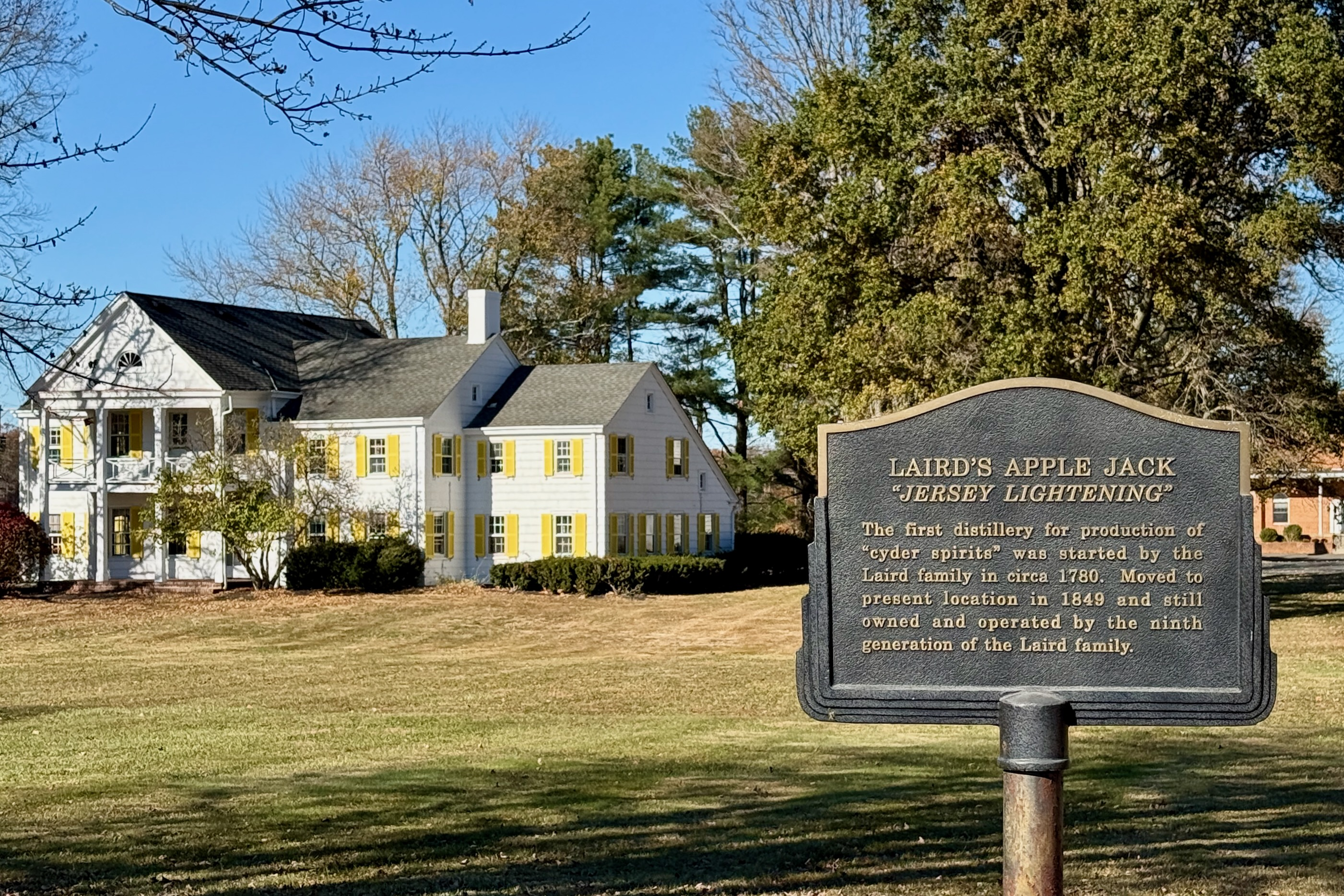
- Laird's Apple Jack sign

- Location within Monmouth County, New Jersey Location within New Jersey Location within the United States
- Coordinates: 40°17′55″N 74°8′33″W
- Area: 25 acres (10 ha)
- NRHP reference No.: 100010927
- NJRHP No.: 5748

Significant dates
- Added to NRHP: October 31, 2024
- Designated NJRHP: September 4, 2024

The history of the company can be traced to the immigration of William Laird from Fife in Scotland to Monmouth County in 1698. He was among the first to produce applejack in the area. His descendant, Robert Laird, served in the Continental Army under George Washington. Washington asked Laird for his recipe for "cyder spirits" before the Revolution. Today, none of the company's production is located in New Jersey. It obtains all its apples from central Virginia and distills its products in North Garden, Virginia. Distilling at its New Jersey facilities ceased in 1972 and Laird's only blends, ages and bottles its products in Scobeyville.

The Scobeyville property was listed as the Laird & Company Distillery Historic District on the National Register of Historic Places on October 31, 2024, for its significance in agriculture, architecture, and industry. The 25-acre (10 ha) historic district includes 5 contributing buildings, 2 contributing sites and 1 contributing structure. The Laird family's residence was built in three phases. The oldest section may date to before the American Revolutionary War. The next section was built around 1849 and the final section in 1934, when the house became the administrative office for the company. It features Colonial Revival architecture. The Still House was built between the 1880s and 1933. Three distilling equipment rooms were added in 1934 and 1935. The pond was created in 1934 by damming the Yellow Brook. The water was used for cooling the distilling equipment.

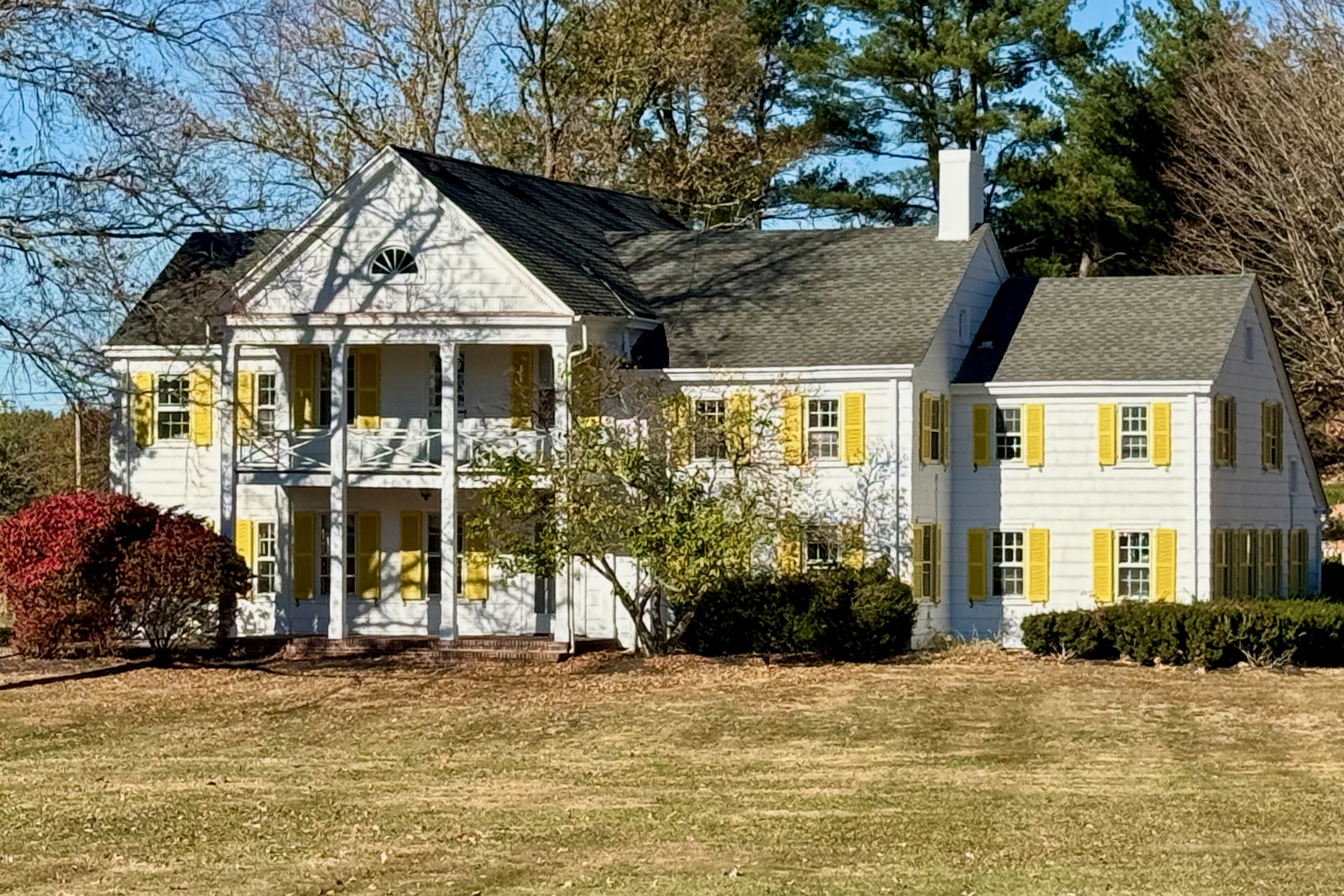
Former Laird family's residence, now administrative office

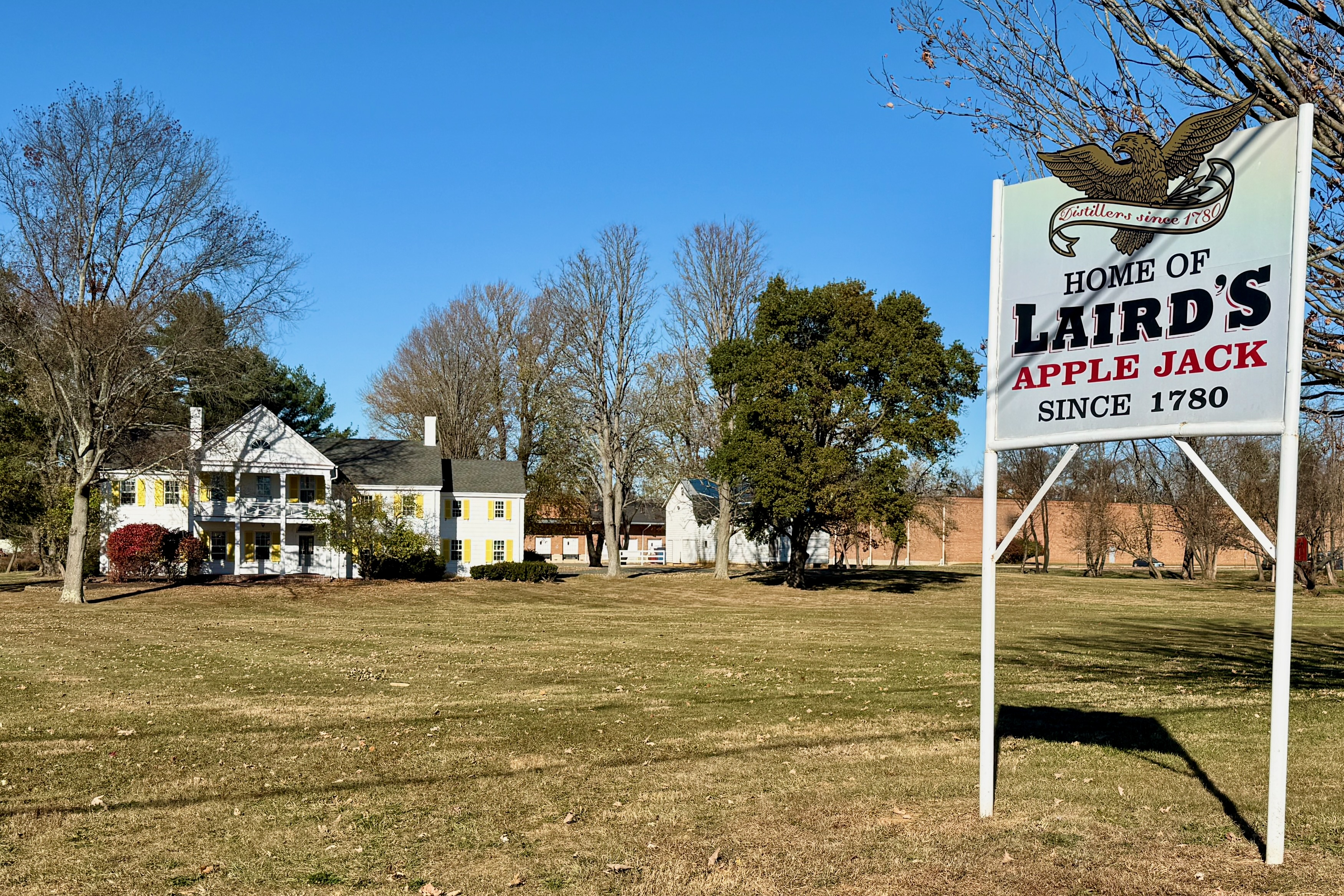
Home of Laird's Apple Jack

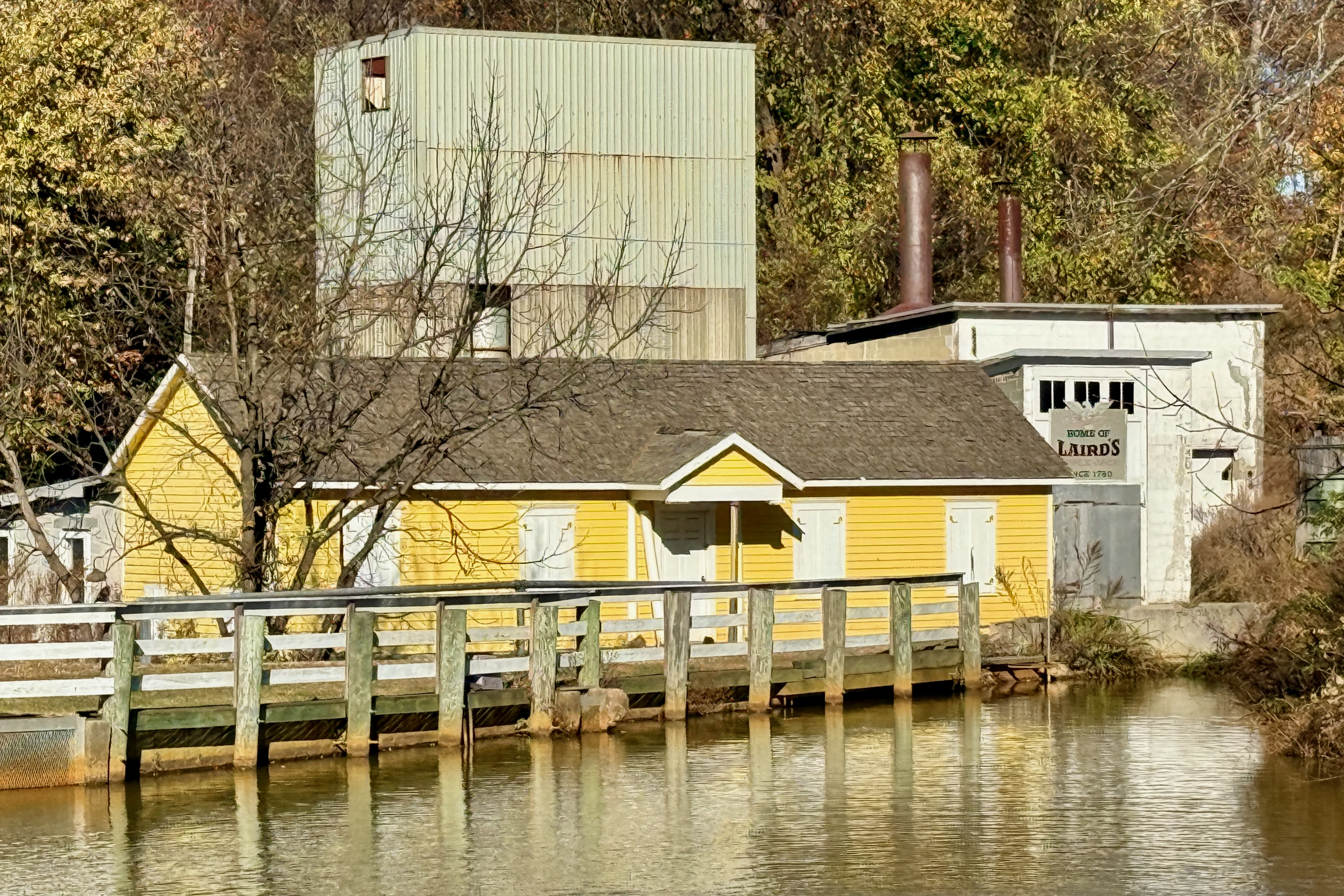
Still House and pond

== See also ==
- Alcohol laws of New Jersey
- List of wineries, breweries, and distilleries in New Jersey
- New Jersey wine
- New Jersey distilled spirits
- New Jersey Division of Alcoholic Beverage Control
- National Register of Historic Places listings in Monmouth County, New Jersey
