= Tun Tavern Brewery =

Tun Tavern Restaurant
- Type: Brewpub
- Location: 2 Convention Boulevard, Atlantic City, New Jersey, USA
- Coordinates: 39.3621°N 74.4388°W
- Opened: 1998
- Key people: Montgomery Dahm, William Mink, David Ruth
- Annual production volume: 700 US beer barrels (820 hL) in 2006
- Distribution: On-site
- Website: http://tuntavern.com/

Tun Tavern Restaurant & Brewery is a brewpub in Atlantic City in Atlantic County, New Jersey. The brewery opened to the public in 1998 and was named for the historical Tun Tavern, a colonial establishment located in Philadelphia from 1685–1781. The brewery produced 550 barrels of beer in 2006.

== Beers and other products ==
Tun Tavern specializes in the production of English, Irish, German, and American-style beers. Common beer styles made at the brewery include Berlin-style Weisse and hefeweizen, red ales, seasonal beers, weizenbocks, and west coast IPAs featuring hops grown locally in New Jersey.

== Licensing and associations ==
Tun Tavern has a restricted brewery license from the New Jersey Division of Alcoholic Beverage Control, which allows it to produce up to 10,000 barrels of beer per year, to sell on-premises, to wholesalers, and at festivals in the state, and to offer samples at off-premises charitable or civic events. The brewery is a member of the Garden State Craft Brewers Guild.

== See also ==
- Alcohol laws of New Jersey
- Beer in New Jersey
- Beer in the United States
- List of wineries, breweries, and distilleries in New Jersey
