= Basil T's Brewery =

Brewery in Red Bank, New Jersey

- Interactive map of Basil T's Brewery
- Type: Brewpub
- Location: 183 Riverside Avenue, Red Bank, NJ, USA
- Coordinates: 40.3532°N 74.0747°W
- Opened: 1996
- Key people: Victor Rallo Jr., Mike Sella
- Annual production volume: 650 US beer barrels (760 hL) in 2009
- Other products: Italian food
- Distribution: On-site, festivals
- Tasting: Tastings daily, tours by appointment
- Website: birravino.com

Basil T's Brewery was a brewpub in Red Bank in Monmouth County, New Jersey. In 1987 Victor Rallo Jr., his brother and late father opened and Italian restaurant, then converted into a brewpub 1996. The brewery opened a second location in Toms River in 1997, which was later sold and renamed Artisan's Brewery. The brewery produces 650 barrels of beer per year. In 2014 the owners re-opened as Birravino (the combined Italian words for beer and wine).

== Beers and other products ==
Basil T's Brewery is best known for its dry stout. The brewery also produces pale ales, porters, red ales, seasonal beers, and wheat beers. Basil T's serves Italian food, and emphasizes beer and food parings.

The new restaurant Birravino will have a beer list that will consist of three in-house brews, two guest drafts and 50 bottled varieties from around the world, all priced between $7 and $20. Its wine selection will offer more than 100 bottles, all priced at $50 or less.

== Licensing and associations ==
Basil T's has a restricted brewery license from the New Jersey Division of Alcoholic Beverage Control, which allows it to produce up to 10,000 barrels of beer per year, to sell on-premises, to wholesalers, and at festivals in the state, and to offer samples at off-premises charitable or civic events. The brewery is a member of the Garden State Craft Brewers Guild.

== See also ==
- Alcohol laws of New Jersey
- Beer in New Jersey
- List of wineries, breweries, and distilleries in New Jersey
