= List of wineries, breweries, and distilleries in New Jersey =

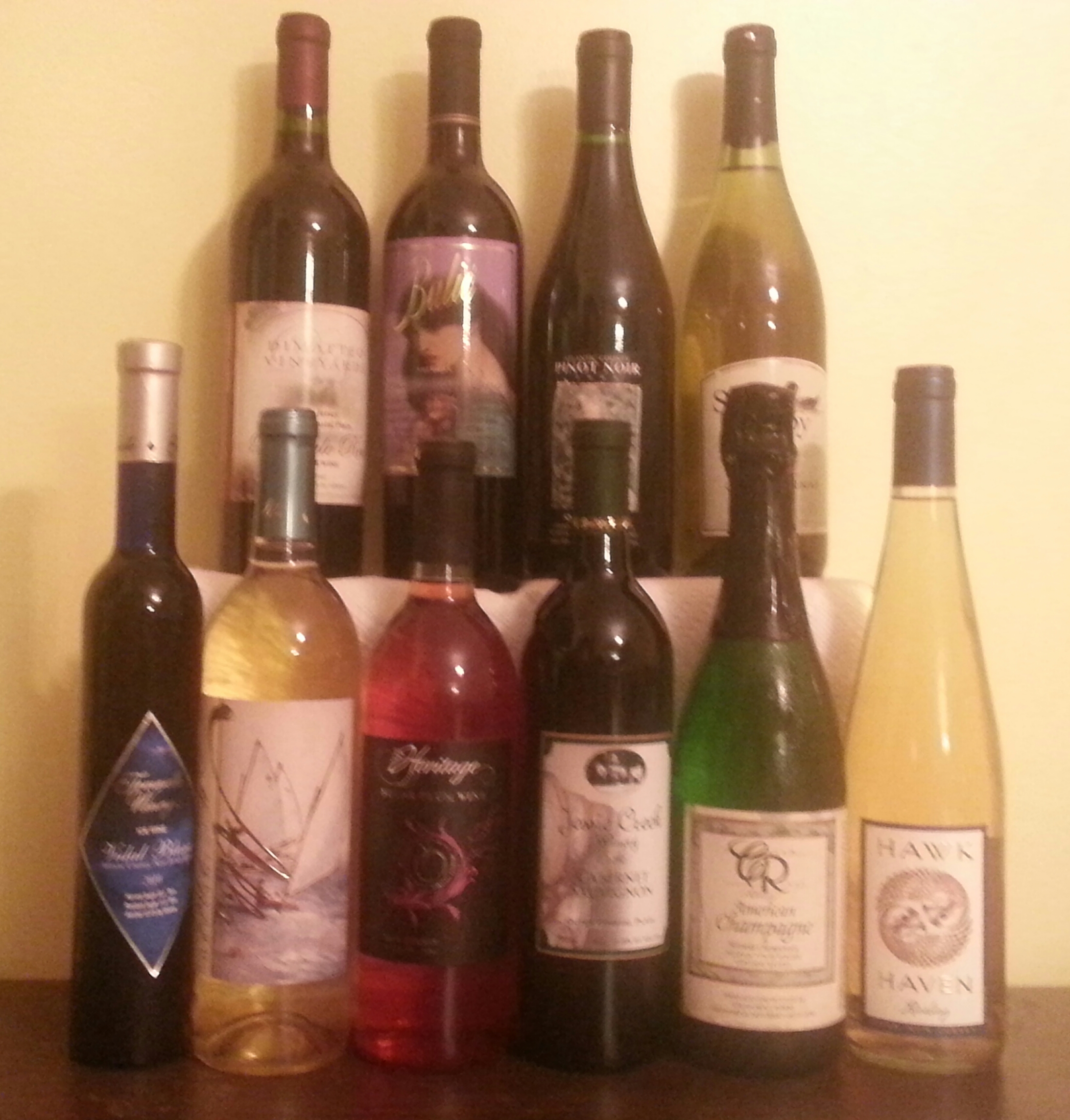
This is an assortment of New Jersey wines. New Jersey's 51 wineries produce wine from more than 90 varieties of grapes, and from over 25 other fruits.

This is a list of wineries, breweries, cideries, meaderies, and distilleries in the state of New Jersey in the United States. As of January 2024, there are 51 wineries, 114 breweries, 18 brewpubs, 26 distilleries, 3 cideries and 1 meadery that are licensed and in operation within the state. The following lists do not include producers which are no longer in business, or those that are in the process of being established.

== History ==
Alcoholic beverages (i.e., beer, wine, and spirits) have been produced in New Jersey since the colonial era. The first brewery in New Jersey was established in a fledgling Dutch settlement in what is now Hoboken when the state was part the Dutch New Netherlands colony. It was short-lived and destroyed by a band of Lenape in 1643 during Governor Kieft's War (1643-1645). The production of beer in New Jersey ranges from large international conglomerates like Anheuser-Busch to microbreweries producing smaller quantities using artisanal methods. The industrial northeastern corner of the state has historically been a major beer-production region, and the majority of New Jersey's breweries and brewpubs are in that region. Laird & Company, founded around 1780 in the village of Scobeyville in Colts Neck, is the oldest licensed distillery in the United States, having received license No. 1 from the Department of the Treasury.

Wine grapes were planted by the early settlers of New Jersey, and some of the current wineries were established in locations where wine grapes were already present. In 1767, the Royal Society of Arts in London praised two wines made on New Jersey plantations for making fine quality products derived from colonial agriculture. The oldest, continuously-operated winery in the state, Renault Winery, was established in 1864.

The production of wine in New Jersey largely consists of small farm wineries. Because of its sandy soil and warmer climate, the majority of the state's wineries are located in South Jersey's Outer Coastal Plain Viticultural Area. A handful of wineries are in western New Jersey's Warren Hills Viticultural Area. Part of the Central Delaware Valley Viticultural Area is in New Jersey, but no New Jersey wineries are currently in this viticultural area.

New Jersey wineries produce wine from more than 90 varieties of grapes, and from over 25 other fruits.

Until the 1980s, prohibition-era laws severely restricted the number of wineries, breweries, and distilleries in the state. In 1981, the New Jersey Farm Winery Act exempted low-volume family-owned wineries from the restrictions, and allowed wineries to create outlet stores. Likewise, New Jersey created a limited brewery license for microbreweries and a restricted brewery license for brewpubs. In 1995, the Ship Inn in Milford became the first brewpub in New Jersey since Prohibition. In 2012, New Jersey liberalized its licensing laws to allow microbreweries to sell beer by the glass as part of a tour, and sell up to 15.5 gallons (i.e., a keg) for off-premises consumption. The same legislation permits brewpubs to brew up to 10,000 barrels of beer per year, and sell to wholesalers and at festivals. In 2013, New Jersey issued the first new distillery license since Prohibition to Jersey Artisan Distilling, and passed a law creating a craft distillery license. In 2017, New Jersey passed a law creating a cidery and meadery license.

== List of producers ==
The following is a list of wineries, breweries, and distilleries in New Jersey, including the town and county where the establishment is located, the year when the business first sold to the public wine, beer, or liquor that it produces, the type of ABC license that the business has, and the number of cases or barrels produced annually. For wineries, the table also lists the AVA that the winery is located in, the year grapes were first planted for commercial use, and the number of acres planted with grapes. The town listed is based on the establishment's physical address, which may differ from its mailing address.

In the United States, a standard case of wine is 2.38 US gallons (9.0 L), and a standard barrel of beer or spirits is 31.5 US gallons (119 L).

=== Wineries ===
American Viticultural Areas (AVAs):

- CMP = Cape May Peninsula AVA
- CDV = Central Delaware Valley AVA
- OCP = Outer Coastal Plain AVA
- WH = Warren Hills AVA
- None = not in a recognized AVA

Licenses:

- Farm = Farm winery license
- Plenary = Plenary winery license

Name	Town	County	Year planted	Year opened	AVA	License	Acres	Cases
Alba Vineyard	Finesville	Warren	1980	1982	WH	Plenary	42	11,000
Amalthea Cellars	Atco	Camden	1976	1981	OCP	Plenary	10	5,000
Auburn Road Vineyards	Pilesgrove	Salem	2004	2007	OCP	Plenary	19	4,200
Autumn Lake Winery	Williamstown	Gloucester	2012	2014	OCP	Plenary	10	4,000
Balic Winery	Mays Landing	Atlantic	Early 1800s	1966	OCP	Plenary	57	
Bellview Winery	Landisville	Atlantic	2000	2001	OCP	Plenary	40	8,000
Beneduce Vineyards	Pittstown	Hunterdon	2009	2012	None	Plenary	10	3,000
Brook Hollow Winery	Columbia	Warren	2002	2007	WH	Farm	8	1,050
Cape May Winery & Vineyard	North Cape May	Cape May	1992	1995	CMP	Plenary	25	11,000
Cedarvale Winery	Logan	Gloucester	2004	2008	None	Farm	8	2,500
Chestnut Run Farm	Pilesgrove	Salem	1986	2007	OCP	Farm	5	700
Coda Rossa Winery	Franklinville	Gloucester	2002	2010	OCP	Plenary	10	1,500
Cream Ridge Winery	Cream Ridge	Monmouth	1987	1988	None	Plenary	14	5,000
DeMastro Vineyards	Vincentown	Burlington			OCP	Farm	31	7,000
DiBella Winery	Woolwich	Gloucester	2002	2010	OCP	Farm	4	250
DiMatteo Vineyards	Hammonton	Atlantic	2000	2002	OCP	Farm	14	1,500
Four JG's Orchards & Vineyards	Colts Neck	Monmouth	1999	2004	None	Farm	40	2,500
Four Sisters Winery	White Township	Warren	1981	1984	WH	Plenary	8	5,000
Hawk Haven Vineyard & Winery	Rio Grande	Cape May	1997	2009	CMP	Plenary	9	4,200
Hopewell Valley Vineyards	Hopewell	Mercer	2001	2003	None	Plenary	25	6,000
Jessie Creek Winery	Dias Creek	Cape May	2002	2012	CMP	Plenary	5	1,200
Laurita Winery	New Egypt	Ocean	1998	2008	OCP	Plenary	44	14,000
Monroeville Vineyard & Winery	Monroeville	Salem	2010	2012	OCP	Plenary	4	1,800
Mount Salem Vineyards	Pittstown	Hunterdon	2005	2010	None	Farm	7	1,000
Natali Vineyards	Goshen	Cape May	2001	2007	CMP	Plenary	7	1,800
Old York Cellars	Ringoes	Hunterdon	1978	2010	None	Plenary	12	3,600
Plagido's Winery	Hammonton	Atlantic	1999	2007	OCP	Farm	14	4,200
Renault Winery	Egg Harbor City	Atlantic	1864	1870	OCP	Plenary	48	20,000
Sharrott Winery	Blue Anchor	Camden	2005	2008	OCP	Plenary	6	7,000
Sylvin Farms Winery	Germania	Atlantic	1977	1985	OCP	Farm	11	1,000
Terhune Orchards	Lawrence	Mercer	2003	2010	None	Plenary	5	1,100
Tomasello Winery	Hammonton	Atlantic	1888	1933	OCP	Plenary	70	65,000
Turdo Vineyards & Winery	North Cape May	Cape May	1999	2004	CMP	Farm	5	1,100
Unionville Vineyards	Ringoes	Hunterdon	1988	1993	None	Plenary	54	8,500
Vacchiano Farm	Washington	Warren	2004	2009	WH	Plenary	11	2,500
Valenzano Winery	Shamong	Burlington	1991	1996	OCP	Plenary	44	40,000
Ventimiglia Vineyard	Wantage	Sussex	2002	2008	None	Farm	5	1,000
Villa Milagro Vineyards	Finesville	Warren	2003	2007	WH	Plenary	11	1,500
Wagonhouse Winery	South Harrison	Gloucester	2004	2005	OCP	Plenary	10	7,000
William Heritage Winery	Mullica Hill	Gloucester	1998	2002	OCP	Plenary	40	13,000
Willow Creek Winery	West Cape May	Cape May	2005	2012	CMP	Farm	40	6,000
Working Dog Winery	East Windsor	Mercer	2001	2003	None	Plenary	16	3,500

=== Breweries ===
Licenses:

- Plenary = Plenary brewing license (macrobrewery)
- Limited = Limited brewing license (microbrewery/craft brewery)
- Restricted = Restricted brewing license (brewpub)

Name	Town	County	Year opened	License	Barrels
Anheuser-Busch	Newark	Essex	1951	Plenary	10,000,000
Artisan's Brewery	Toms River	Ocean	1997	Restricted	300
Birravino	Red Bank	Monmouth	1996	Restricted	650
Carton Brewing	Atlantic Highlands	Monmouth	2011	Limited	8,600
Climax Brewing	Roselle Park	Union	1994	Limited	1,000
Cricket Hill Brewery	Fairfield	Essex	2000	Limited	3,000
Egan & Sons	Montclair	Essex	2005	Restricted	150
Flounder Brewing	Hillsborough	Somerset	2013	Limited	50
Flying Fish Brewing	Somerdale	Camden	1996	Limited	30,000
Gaslight Brewery	South Orange	Essex	1998	Restricted	650
Ghost Hawk Brewing Company	Clifton	Passaic	2019	Limited	1,200
Harvest Moon Brewery	New Brunswick	Middlesex	1996	Restricted	850
Iron Hill Brewery	Voorhees	Camden	2013	Restricted	1,250
Kane Brewing	Ocean Township	Monmouth	2011	Restricted	10,000
Krogh's Brewpub	Sparta	Sussex	1999	Restricted	400
Long Valley Brewery	Long Valley	Morris	1995	Restricted	735
River Horse Brewery	Ewing Township	Mercer	1996	Limited	13,000
Ship Inn	Milford	Hunterdon	1995	Restricted	365
Triumph Brewing	Princeton	Mercer	1995	Restricted	2,450
Tun Tavern Brewery	Atlantic City	Atlantic	1998	Restricted	700
Belford Brewing	Belford	Monmouth	2014	Limited	500

=== Distilleries ===
Licenses:

- Plenary = Plenary distillery license
- Limited = Limited distilling license
- Craft = Craft distilling license
- Rectifier = Rectifier and blender license

Name	Town	County	Year opened	License	Barrels
3BR Distillery, LLC	Keyport	Monmouth	2021	Craft	
All Points West	Newark	Essex	2017	Craft	
Asbury Park Distilling Co	Asbury Park	Monmouth	2017	Craft	
Bellemara Distillery	Hillsborough	Somerset	2021	Craft	
Blue Rascal	Hammonton	Atlantic	2021	Craft	
Claremont Distillery	Fairfield	Essex	2014	Craft	
Colts Neck Stillhouse	Colts Neck	Monmouth	2019	Craft	
Garden State Distillery	Toms River	Ocean	2019	Craft	
Heathermeade Distillery	Kenilworth	Union	2014	Craft	
Jersey Artisan Distilling	Fairfield	Essex	2013	Craft	800
Jersey Spirits Distilling Co.	Fairfield	Essex	2016	Craft	500
Laird & Company	Scobeyville	Monmouth	1780	Rectifier	
Lazy Eye Distillery	Richland	Atlantic	2016	Craft	
Little Water Distillery	Atlantic City	Atlantic	2016	Craft	
Long Branch Distillery	Long Branch	Monmouth	2017	Craft	
Milk Street Distillery	Branchville	Sussex	2017	Craft	
Mission Spirits	Millville	Cumberland	2021	Craft	
Nauti Spirits	Cape May	Cape May	2017	Craft	
Pine Tavern Distillery	Monroeville	Gloucester	2016	Craft	
Penelope Bourbon	Roselle	Union	2018	Rectifier	
Railroad Distillery	Belford	Monmouth			
Recklesstown Farm Distillery	Columbus	Burlington	2017	Craft	
Silk City Distillers	Clifton	Passaic	2014	Craft	
Skunktown Distillery	Flemington	Hunterdon	2016	Craft	
Sourland Mountain Spirits	Hopewell Township	Mercer	2015	Craft	
Train Wreck Distillery	Mount Holly	Burlington		Craft	

== See also ==
- Alcohol laws of New Jersey
- Beer in New Jersey
- Beer in the United States
- Garden State Wine Growers Association
- Judgment of Princeton
- List of breweries in the United States
- List of microbreweries
- New Jersey distilled spirits
- New Jersey Division of Alcoholic Beverage Control
- New Jersey wine
- New Jersey Wine Industry Advisory Council
