= Terhune Orchards =

Farm

Coordinates: 40.331434°N 74.725325°W

- Location: 330 Cold Soil Road, Princeton, New Jersey, USA
- Coordinates: 40.331434 N, 74.725325 W
- First vines planted: 2003
- Opened to the public: 1975
- Key people: Pam Mount, Tannwen Mount, Reuwai Mount Hanewald (owners)
- Area cultivated: 5
- Cases/yr: 1,100 (estimated, 2013)
- Other products: Bread, cider, doughnuts, flowers, fruits, herbs, pies, vegetables
- Other attractions: Apple picking, wagon rides, playground, animal feeding
- Distribution: On-site, NJ farmers' markets, home shipment
- Tasting: Tastings on Friday, Saturday, and Sunday
- Website: http://www.terhuneorchards.com/

Terhune Orchards is a farm and winery in Lawrence Township (mailing address is Princeton) in Mercer County, New Jersey. Terhune was purchased by Pam and Gary Mount in 1975, and the vineyard was first planted in 2003. The farm has 5 acres of grapes under cultivation and produces an estimated 1,100 cases of wine per year. Terhune Orchards is owned by Pam Mount and her two daughters, Tannwen Mount and Reuwai Mount Hanewald. Gary Mount died peacefully at his home at Terhune Orchards on December 29, 2025, having lived to see over 50 years of his farm's success.

Terhune Orchards also hosts events for school trip tours. All tours complement classroom and homeschool programs by enhancing learning in social studies, environmental science, New Jersey history, and other related subjects. They also align with many of the New Jersey Core Curriculum Content Standards.

== Wines and other products ==
Terhune produces wine from Cabernet Franc, Cabernet Sauvignon, Chambourcin, Chardonnay, Niagara, Orange Muscat, Traminette, and Vidal blanc grapes. Terhune also makes fruit wines from apples, blueberries, and peaches. Additionally, the farm produces and sells bread, cider, doughnuts, flowers, fruits, herbs, pies, and vegetables. It is the only winery in New Jersey that produces wine from Orange Muscat, which is a white vinifera grape of unknown origin that is often used to make dessert wines. Terhune is not located in one of New Jersey's three viticultural areas.

== Features, licensing, and associations ==
During the autumn harvest season, the winery offers apple picking and wagon rides. Terhune has a plenary winery license from the New Jersey Division of Alcoholic Beverage Control, which allows it to produce an unrestricted amount of wine, operate up to 15 off-premises sales rooms, and ship up to 12 cases per year to consumers in-state or out-of-state. The winery is a member of the Garden State Wine Growers Association and its subsidiary, Vintage North Jersey.

== See also ==
- Alcohol laws of New Jersey
- American wine
- Judgment of Princeton
- List of wineries, breweries, and distilleries in New Jersey
- New Jersey Farm Winery Act
- New Jersey Wine Industry Advisory Council
- New Jersey wine
