= Ventimiglia Vineyard =

Winery in Sussex County, New Jersey, US

Coordinates: 41.239545°N 74.595977°W

- Location: 101 Layton Road, Wantage, New Jersey, United States
- Coordinates: 41.239545 N, 74.595977 W
- First vines planted: 2002
- Opened to the public: 2008
- Key people: Anne Ventimiglia, Anthony Ventimiglia, Myla Ventimiglia (owners)
- Acres cultivated: 5
- Cases/yr: 1,000 (2013)
- Other attractions: Picnicking permitted, pet-friendly
- Distribution: On-site, wine festivals, NJ farmers' markets, NJ liquor stores, NJ restaurants, home shipment
- Tasting: Tastings and tours on weekends
- Website: http://www.ventivines.com

Ventimiglia Vineyard is a winery in Wantage Township in Sussex County, New Jersey. The vineyard was first planted in 2002, and opened to the public in 2008. Ventimiglia has 5 acres of grapes that, for a while, were under cultivation, and produces 1,000 cases of wine per year. The winery is named after the family that owns it.

The vineyard also contains hiking trails that are open to the public. Additionally, there are several picnic tables near the main winery.

== Wines ==
Ventimiglia Vineyard produces wine from Cabernet Franc, Carignan, Cayuga White, Chambourcin, Chardonnay, Chenin blanc, Concord, Durif (Petite Sirah), Frontenac gris, Grenache, La Crescent, Merlot, Pinot noir, Sangiovese, Seyval blanc, Sumoll, Syrah, Traminette, Vidal blanc, and Zinfandel grapes. It is the only winery in New Jersey that produces wine from Carignan, Frontenac gris, La Crescent, and Sumoll – Frontenac gris and La Crescent are white hybrid grapes developed in Minnesota, whereas the other two varietals are red vinifera grapes indigenous to Spain. The winery was a participant at the Judgment of Princeton, a wine tasting organized by the American Association of Wine Economists that compared New Jersey wines to premium French vintages. Ventimiglia is not located in one of New Jersey's three viticultural areas.

== Advocacy, licensing, and associations ==
The winery advocates artisanal winemaking techniques, and produces its wines in small batches and then ages them in oak barrels. Ventimiglia has a farm winery license from the New Jersey Division of Alcoholic Beverage Control, which allows it to produce up to 50,000 gallons of wine per year, operate up to 15 off-premises sales rooms, and ship up to 12 cases per year to consumers in-state or out-of-state. The winery is a member of the Garden State Wine Growers Association and its subsidiary, Vintage North Jersey.

== See also ==
- Alcohol laws of New Jersey
- American wine
- List of wineries, breweries, and distilleries in New Jersey
- New Jersey Farm Winery Act
- New Jersey Wine Industry Advisory Council
- New Jersey wine
