= Unionville Vineyards =

American winery located in New Jersey

Coordinates: 40.422590°N 74.829264°W

- Location: 9 Rocktown Road, Ringoes, New Jersey, United States
- Coordinates: 40.422590 N, 74.829264 W
- Appellation: Hunterdon County
- First vines planted: 1988
- First vintage: 1992
- Opened to the public: 1993
- Key people: Lindy Eiref, Robert Wilson (Owners); Cameron Stark (Consulting Winemaker); John Cifelli (General Manager); Austin Sterling & Eric VanSciver (Winemaker)
- Area cultivated: 41
- Cases/yr: 4,500 (2016)
- Known for: Chardonnay wine
- Varietal: Pinot Noir
- Other attractions: Picnicking permitted, pet-friendly
- Distribution: On-site, wine festivals, NJ farmers' markets NJ liquor stores, NJ restaurants, home shipment
- Tasting: Daily tastings, tours on weekends
- Website: www.unionvillevineyards.com

Unionville Vineyard is a winery in the Unionville section of East Amwell in Hunterdon County, New Jersey, United States. Originally part of the largest peach orchard in the United States, the vineyard was first planted in 1988, and opened to the public in 1993. Unionville has 41 acres of grapes under cultivation, and produces 4,500 cases of wine per year. The winery is named for a former village near where the farm is located.

== Wines ==
Unionville Vineyards specializes in the use of Burgundy, Rhône, and Alsatian grapes. Wine is produced from Chardonnay, Cabernet Franc, Cabernet Sauvignon, Chambourcin, Counoise, Gewürztraminer, Marsanne, Mourvèdre, Pinot Gris, Pinot Noir, Riesling, Roussanne, Syrah, and Viognier grapes. It is the only winery in New Jersey that grows and produces wine from Counoise, Marsanne, and Roussanne – vinifera grapes indigenous to the Rhone river valley of France.

Unionville is best known for its single vineyard Chardonnay wines. At the 2010 International Wine and Spirit Competition, which included both blind tasting and laboratory analysis, Unionville's Chardonnay was the only wine from the United States to win a gold (best in class) medal. Likewise, their Chardonnay was the highest-scoring wine from New Jersey at the Judgment of Princeton, a wine tasting organized by the American Association of Wine Economists that compared in-state wines to premium French vintages. The winery is not located in one of New Jersey's three viticultural areas.

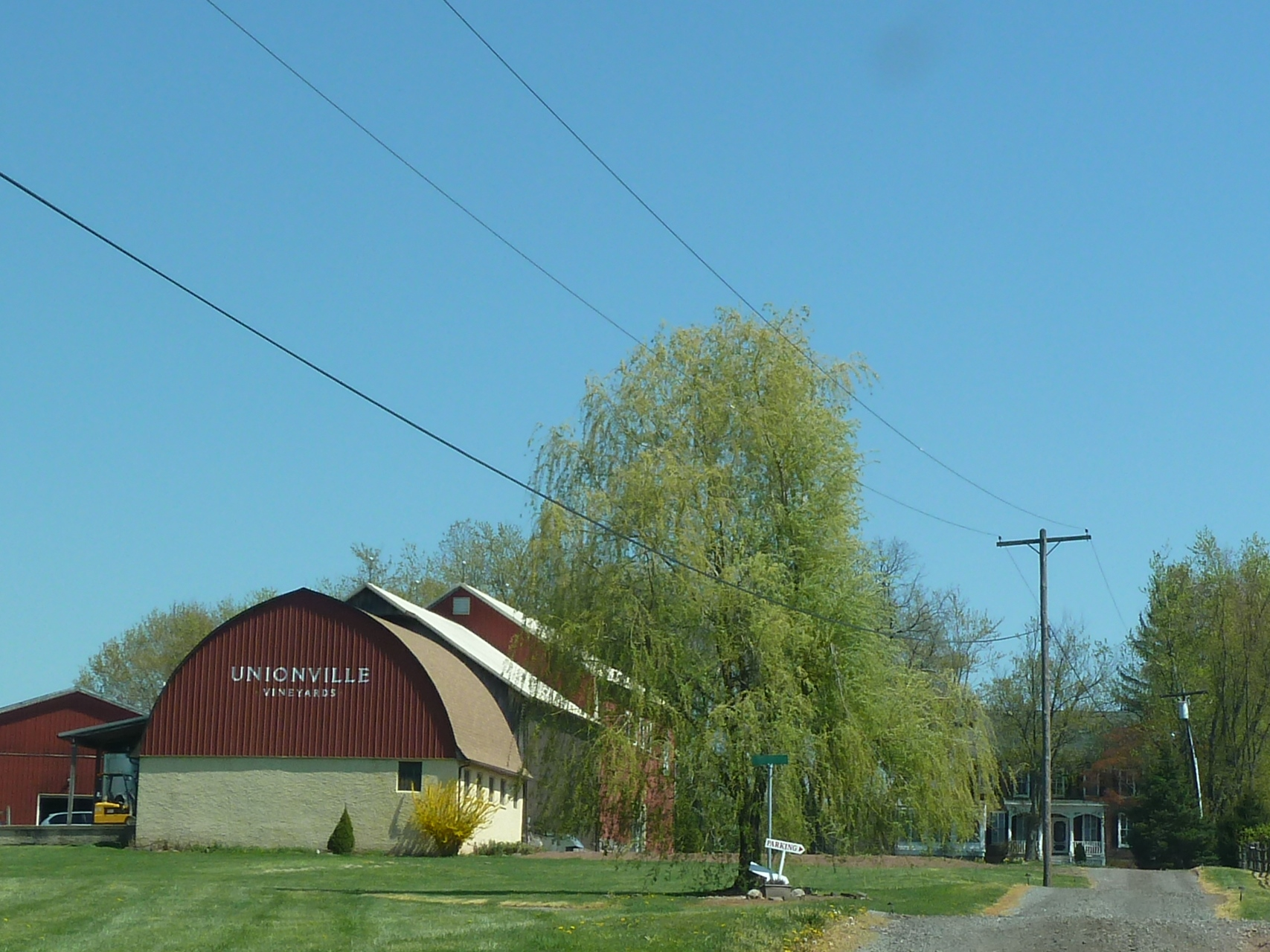
The winery is located on preserved farmland in rustic western New Jersey.

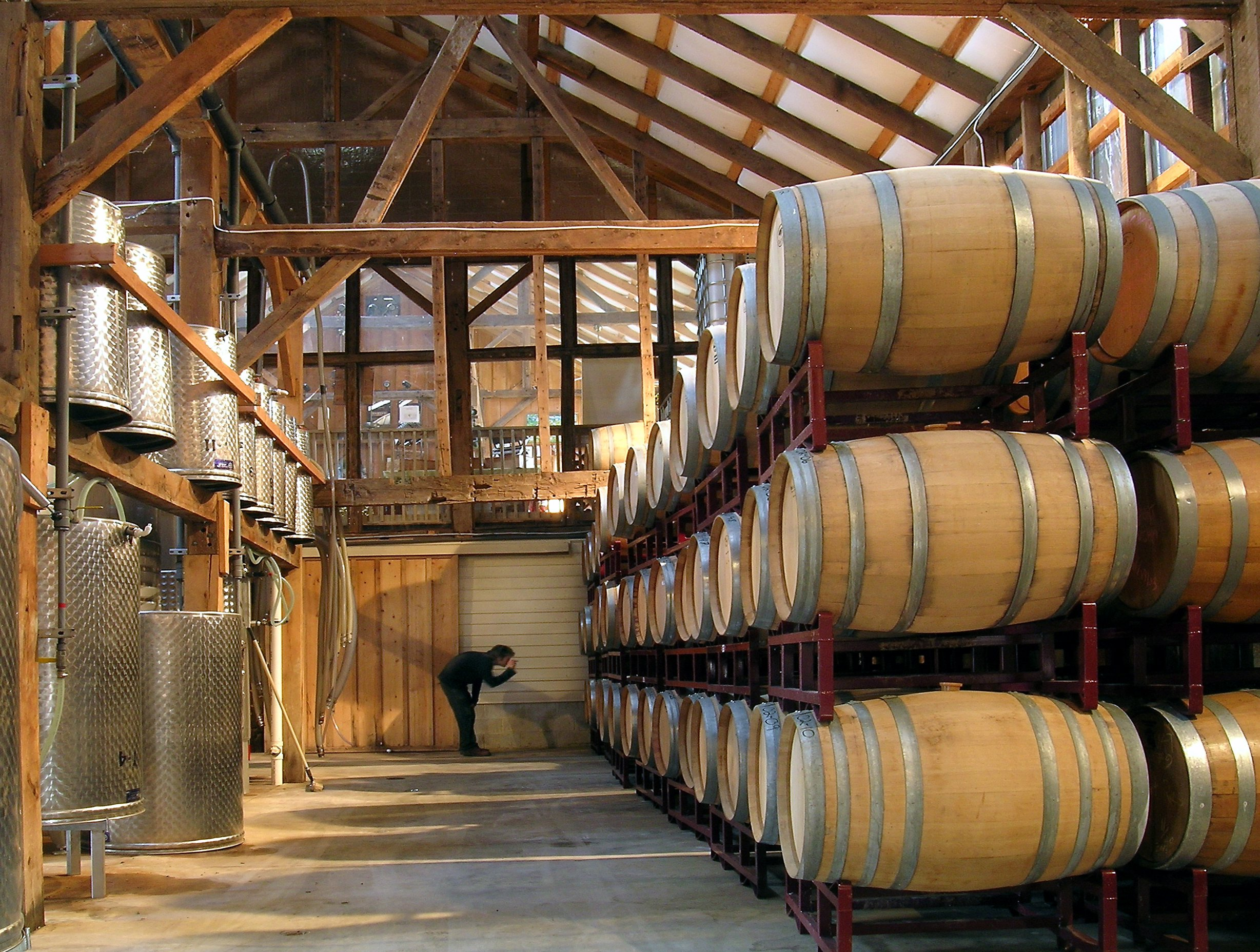
Unionville Vineyards ages most of its wines in neutral French oak barrels.

== Licensing and associations ==
Unionville has a plenary winery license from the New Jersey Division of Alcoholic Beverage Control, which allows it to produce an unrestricted amount of wine, operate up to 15 off-premises sales rooms, and ship up to 12 cases per year to consumers in-state or out-of-state. The winery is a member of The Winemakers Co-Op, a collection of wineries advocating and promoting fine wines from New Jersey-grown vinifera grapes. Unionville Vineyards is also a member of the Garden State Wine Growers Association and Vintage North Jersey.

== See also ==
- Alcohol laws of New Jersey
- American wine
- List of wineries, breweries, and distilleries in New Jersey
- New Jersey Farm Winery Act
- New Jersey Wine Industry Advisory Council
- New Jersey wine
