= Paterson Consolidated Brewing Company =

American brewery based in Paterson, NJ (1890–1920)

- Type: Brewery
- Location: Paterson, New Jersey, USA
- Opened: 1890
- Closed: 1920

Paterson Consolidated Brewing Company is a conglomerate brewery that came about in 1890 with the union of five breweries Braun Brewery, Sprattler & Mennell, Graham Brewery, The Katz Brothers, and Burton Brewery after an English syndicate offered to buy them out.

== History ==
=== Braun Brewery ===
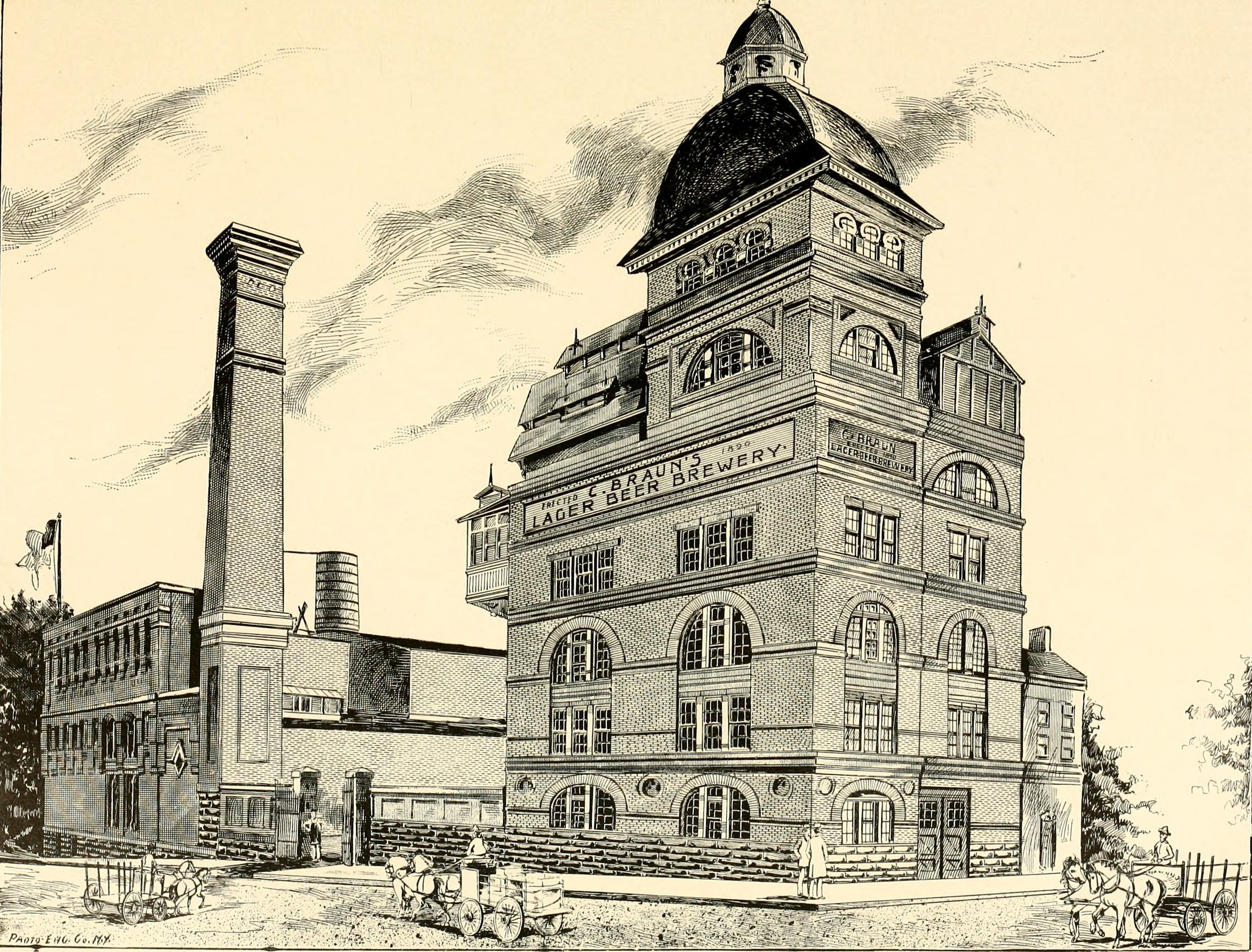
C. Braun Brewery, Ca 1890

Founded by Christian Braun in 1855 on the corner of Braun and Marshall Street in Paterson. The brewery was very successful and even leased its space to Sprattler & Mennell. When Christian died in 1876 his sons Christian Jr. and Luis took over. At its peak it was producing 6,000 barrels a year.

=== Sprattler & Mennel ===

German immigrants Gustav Sprattler and Christian Mennel formed Sprattler & Mennel in 1870 while leasing space from Braun Brewery. In 1876 they moved to their own location on Marshall Street all the way to the Morris and Essex canals. Gustav died in 1885 and Mennel became sole owner. At their peak they brewed 40,000 barrels a year.

=== Graham Brewery ===
James Graham worked at several breweries for over nine years before opening his own brewery in 1887. His brewery was located in the center of the city at next to the New York, Lake Erie & Western Railroad.

=== The Katz Brothers and The Burton Brewery ===
The Burton Brewery began as Katz Brothers, founded by Philip and Bernard Katz in 1877. The original location was on the corner of Godwin and Bridge Street. The Katz Brewery was very successful, but their operation was inadequate; however, they lucked out when Burton Brewery, one of the largest breweries in the state, went up for sale. The Katz Brothers purchased Burton in 1882. The Burton XXX, Morlein's Premium, and Canada Malt Ale were distributed around the country. In 12 years Katz Brothers had grown to 130,000 barrels a year.

== Consolidation ==
Katz Brothers Brewery located at 83 Straight Street

In 1890 the four breweries came together after an English syndicate offered to buy them out. The negotiations ultimately failed, but it still brought the four brewery owners together and made them realize the advantages if they united. The president was Bernard Katz, VP Philip Katz, second VP James Graham, Christian Mennel Treasurer, Luis Braun Secretary, and Christian Braun as Head Brewer. The firm ceased operations in 1920 when prohibition in the United States went into effect. Sprettler & Mennel attempted to revive the brand in 1939, but were not able to maintain a foothold and ceased operations in 1941.

== See also ==
- Alcohol laws of New Jersey
- Beer in New Jersey
- Beer in the United States
- Hinchliffe Brewing
- List of wineries, breweries, and distilleries in New Jersey
