= Coda Rossa Winery =

Winery in New Jersey, United States

Coordinates: 39.578121°N 75.001868°W

Coda Rossa Vineyards
- Location: 1526 Dutch Mill Road, Franklinville, NJ, USA
- Coordinates: 39.578121 N, 75.001868 W
- Appellation: Outer Coastal Plain AVA
- First vines planted: 2002
- Opened to the public: 2010
- Key people: Shaun Hatton, Joseph DeVito, Joseph Nardini, Patrick Cantilo, Bryan O'Rourke (owners)
- Acres cultivated: 10
- Cases/yr: 1,500 (2014)
- Other attractions: Instructional winemaking
- Distribution: On-site, wine festivals, NJ liquor stores, NJ restaurants
- Tasting: Tastings Friday to Sunday
- Website: http://www.codarossa.com/

Coda Rossa Winery is a winery in the Franklinville section of Franklin Township in Gloucester County, New Jersey, United States. The vineyard was first planted in 2002. The current owners obtained the property and winery in 2021, and previously Coda Rossa opened to the public in 2010. Coda Rossa has 10 acres of grapes under cultivation, and produces 1,500 cases of wine per year. The winery is named for the Italian words coda rossa which mean "red tail," because of the red-tailed hawks that live near the farm.

== Wines ==
Coda Rossa Winery is in the Outer Coastal Plain AVA, and produces wine from Barbera, Cabernet Franc, Cabernet Sauvignon, Cayuga White, Chambourcin, Chardonnay, Concord, Durif (Petite Sirah), Merlot, Nebbiolo, Niagara, Pinot gris, Sangiovese, Sauvignon blanc, Syrah, Vidal blanc, and Zinfandel grapes. The winery also makes fruit wines from blackberries, blueberries, peaches, and raspberries.

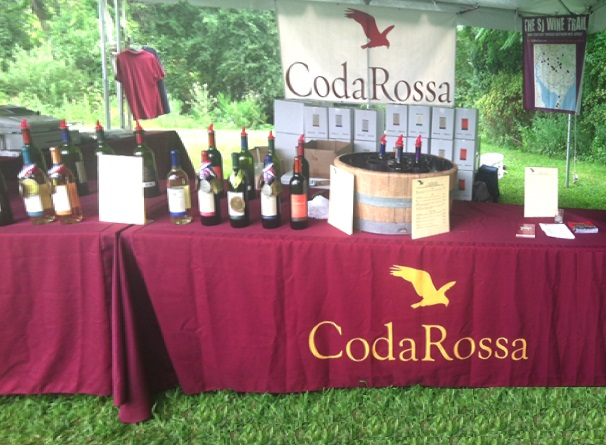
Coda Rossa participates in many wine festivals each year.

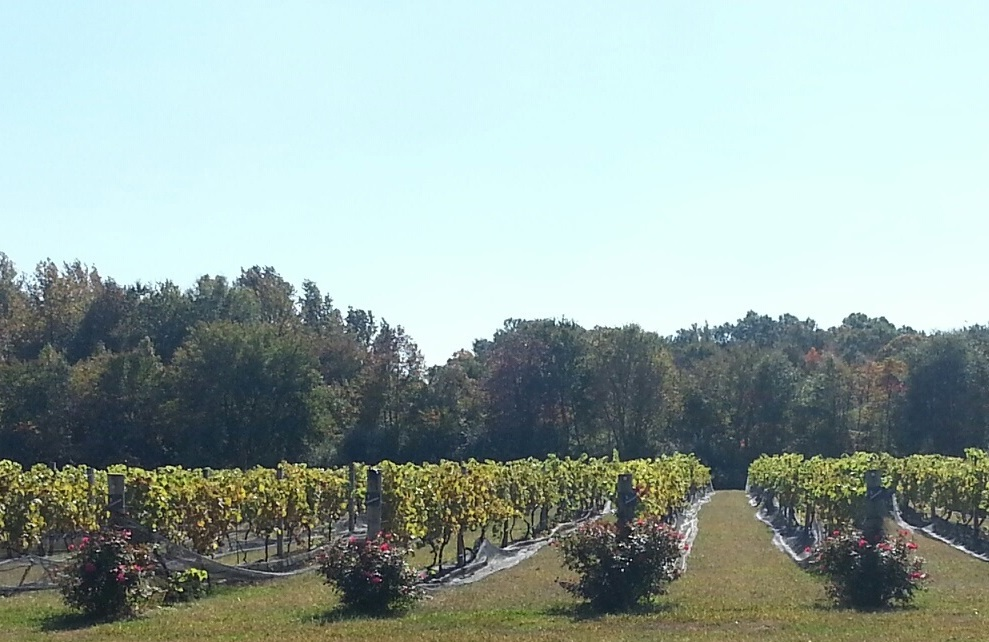
The winery has 13 acres of land, of which 10 acres is cultivated with grapes.

== Licensing, associations, and other properties ==
Coda Rossa has a plenary winery license from the New Jersey Division of Alcoholic Beverage Control, which allows it to produce an unrestricted amount of wine, operate up to 15 off-premises sales rooms, and ship up to 12 cases per year to consumers in-state or out-of-state. The winery is a member of the Garden State Wine Growers Association and the Outer Coastal Plain Vineyard Association. In 2004, the owners of Coda Rossa founded The Wine Room, an instructional winemaking facility in Cherry Hill, New Jersey.

== See also ==
- Alcohol laws of New Jersey
- American wine
- Judgment of Princeton
- List of wineries, breweries, and distilleries in New Jersey
- New Jersey Farm Winery Act
- New Jersey Wine Industry Advisory Council
- New Jersey wine
