= HVV (disambiguation) =

HVV is the public transport body in Hamburg, Germany Hamburger Verkehrsverbund.

It may also refer to:

- Hopewell Valley Vineyards, in New Jersey, United States
- HVV Den Haag, a Dutch football club
- Santa María Del Mar Huave language, spoken in Mexico
- Survivor: Heroes vs. Villains, the 20th season of the CBS reality series Survivor.
