= The Applejacks =

The Applejacks may refer to:

- The Applejacks (British band)
- The Applejacks (American band)
- The Applejacks (Dutch band)

== See also ==
- Applejack (disambiguation)
