= Macon-Harrison House =

Historic house in Arkansas, United States

- Macon--Harrison House
- U.S. National Register of Historic Places
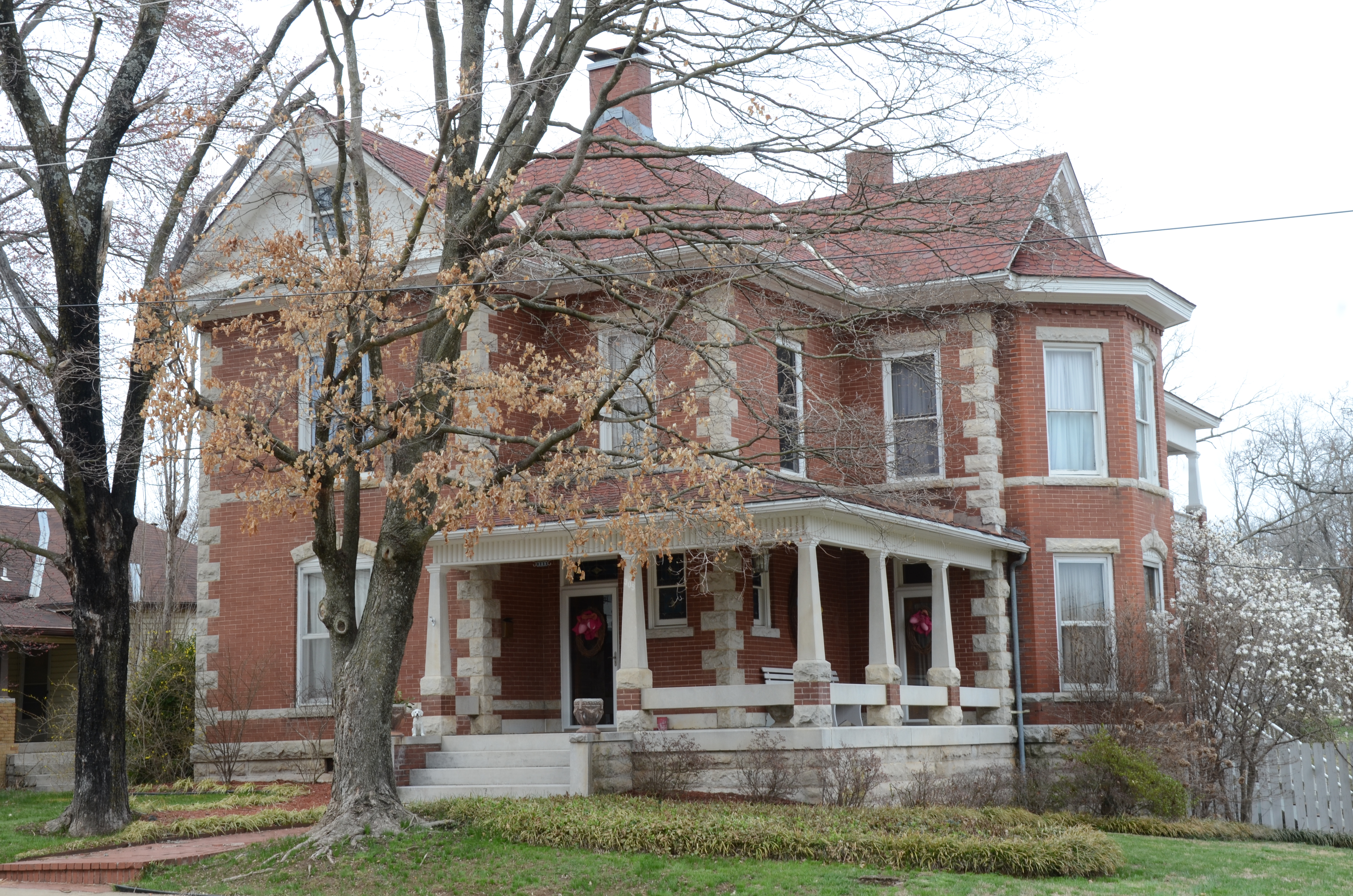

- Location within Arkansas Location within the United States
- Location: 309 N.E. Second St., Bentonville, Arkansas
- Coordinates: 36°22′23″N 94°12′21″W
- Area: less than one acre
- Built: 1910
- Built by: Tom Haney
- MPS: Benton County MRA
- NRHP reference No.: 87002333
- Added to NRHP: January 28, 1988

The Macon-Harrison House is a historic house at 209 NE Second Street in Bentonville, Arkansas. Built in 1910, it is a large two-story brick structure with limestone trim, including corner quoining, porch columns and balustrades. This high-quality late Victorian house was built by John Macon, who profited from the local apple industry by building an applejack distillery. Macon reportedly built it as a wedding gift for his bride.

The house was listed on the National Register of Historic Places in 1988.

== See also ==
- National Register of Historic Places listings in Benton County, Arkansas
