= River Horse Brewery =

Craft brewery in Mercer County, New Jersey

River Horse Brewing Company
- Type: Craft Brewery
- Location: Ewing Township, New Jersey, USA
- Opened: 1996
- Key people: Jim, Jack, and Tim Bryan (founders)
- Annual production volume: 13,000 barrels a year
- Owned by: Glenn Bernabeo and Chris Walsh
- Distribution: On-site
- Tasting: Tastings and tours on Friday, Saturday, and Sunday
- Website: www.riverhorse.com

River Horse Brewing Co. is a craft brewery in Ewing Township in Mercer County, New Jersey. It was started in 1996 but then came under new ownership in 2007. It is NJ's second largest craft brewery, after Flying Fish Brewery.

== History ==
River Horse Brewing Co. was founded by the Bryan brother, Jim, Jack, and Tim. The original location was in Lambertville, New Jersey in the 10,000 sq ft OTC Cracker Factory. After 11 years, the brother sold the brewery to Glenn Bernabeo and Chris Walsh, who just sold their private equity firm SSG Capital Advisors and were looking for "Another Challenge". In 2013 they moved the brewery to a new 25,000 sq ft facility in Ewing, NJ.

== Products ==
River Horse's main beer styles are: "Hippotizing IPA" an American IPA, "Tripel Horse" a Belgian-style Tripel Ale, "Roly Poly Pils" a Czech Style Pilsner, "My Name Is Citrus Maximus" a fruited IPA, River Horse IPA, and "Special Ale" an American Amber Ale. They also produce a variety of seasonal ales, such as a summer blonde ale and autumn pumpkin ale.

== Awards and recognition ==
In 2017, River Horse's Triple Horse won third place in the GABF.

== See also ==
- Alcohol laws of New Jersey
- Beer in New Jersey
- Beer in the United States
- List of wineries, breweries, and distilleries in New Jersey
