= Working Dog Winery =

American winery located in New Jersey

Coordinates: 40.232429°N 74.539829°W

- Location: 610 Windsor-Perrineville Road, Hightstown, New Jersey, USA Robbinsville, NJ
- Coordinates: 40.232429 N, 74.539829 W
- Formerly: Silver Decoy Winery
- First vines planted: 2001
- First vintage: 2004
- Opened to the public: 2003
- Key people: Sharon and Kevin Kyle and Carlee Ludwig (new owners), Todd Abrahams, Brian Carduner, Mark Carduner, Russell Forman, Jerry Watlington (previous owners)
- Area cultivated: 17
- Cases/yr: 4,000
- Other attractions: Pet friendly, Family friendly
- Distribution: On-site, wine festivals, NJ restaurants
- Tasting: Tastings Thursday to Sunday
- Website: http://www.workingdogwinerynj.com/

Working Dog Winery is a winery located on the border of Robbinsville Township and East Windsor in Mercer County, New Jersey. The vineyard was first planted in 2001 and opened to the public in 2003. The winery was originally known as "Silver Decoy Winery," but the name was changed in 2013. Working Dog has 17 acres of grapes under cultivation and produces 4,000 cases of wine per year.

== Wines ==
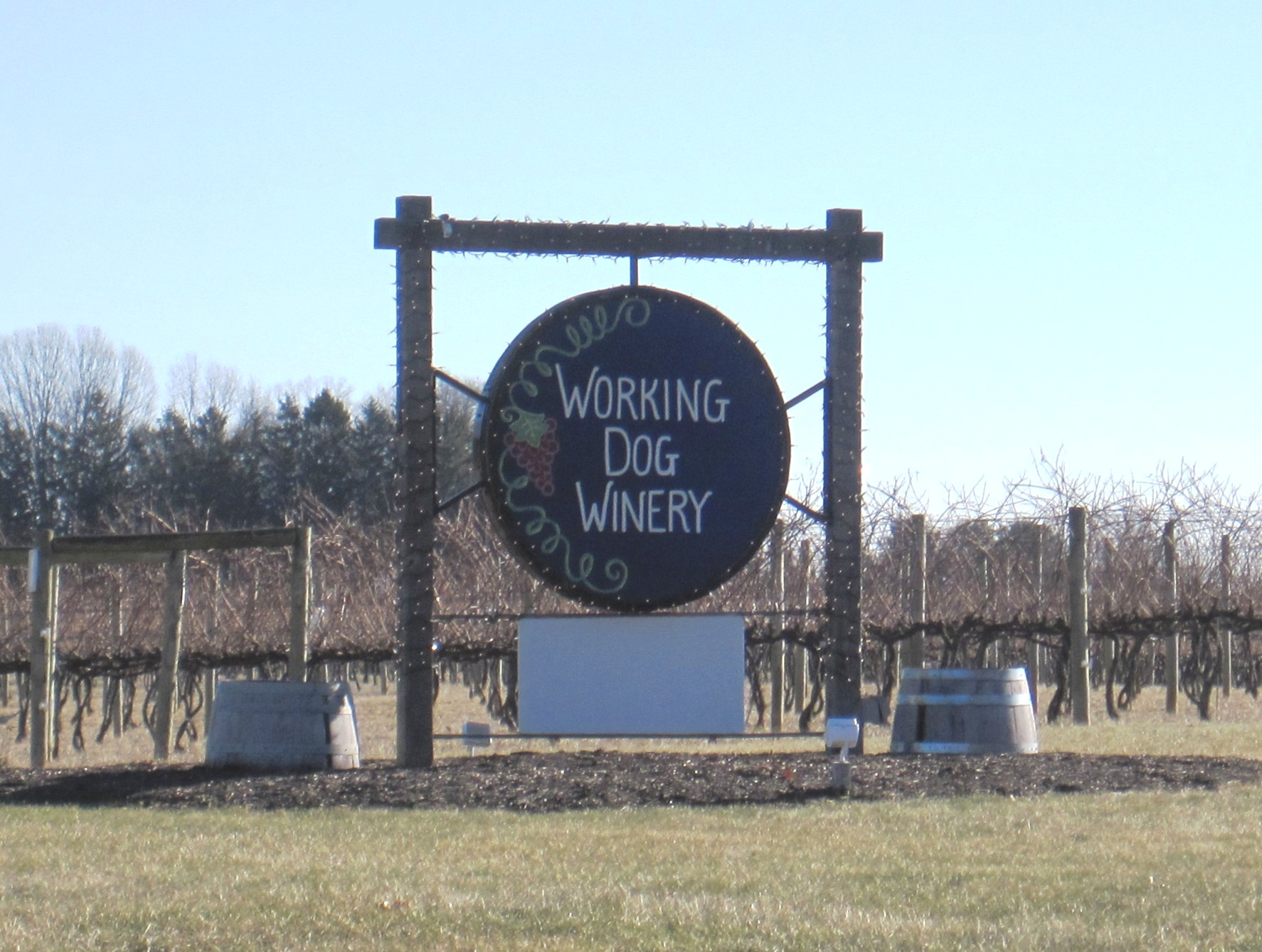
Sign at the entrance

Working Dog Winery produces wine from Cabernet Franc, Merlot, Cabernet Sauvignon, Syrah, Sangiovese, Chambourcin, Marechal Foch, Chardonnay, Viognier, Pinot gris, Riesling, and Traminette grapes. Working Dog also makes fruit wine from blueberries. The winery was a participant at the Judgment of Princeton, a wine tasting organized by the American Association of Wine Economists that compared New Jersey wines to premium French vintages.

== Licensing and associations ==
Working Dog has a plenary winery license from the New Jersey Division of Alcoholic Beverage Control, which allows it to produce an unrestricted amount of wine, operate up to 15 off-premises sales rooms. The winery is a member of the Garden State Wine Growers Association.

== See also ==
- Alcohol laws of New Jersey
- American wine
- Judgment of Princeton
- List of wineries, breweries, and distilleries in New Jersey
- New Jersey Farm Winery Act
- New Jersey Wine Industry Advisory Council
- New Jersey wine
