= Applejack =

Applejack or apple jack may refer to:

== Entertainment ==
- Apple Jack, a 2003 American short film directed by Mark Whiting
- Captain Applejack, a 1931 American comedy film
- Apple Jack (video game), a game on Xbox Live Indie Games
- "Applejacks" (Murder in Suburbia), a 2004 television episode
- Applejack (My Little Pony), a character from the fourth incarnation of My Little Pony

== Food ==
- Applejack (drink), an American strong alcoholic drink produced from apples
- Apple Jacks, a brand of American breakfast cereal made by Kellogg's

== Music ==
- The Applejacks (disambiguation), several musical groups
- Applejack, an early name of the Canadian rock band Trooper (band)
- "Applejack" (song), a 1963 song by Jet Harris and Tony Meehan
- "Applejack", song by Dolly Parton from her 1977 album New Harvest...First Gathering

== Other uses ==
- AppleJack, troubleshooting software for Mac OS X
- Wellesley Applejacks, a Canadian Junior ice hockey team in Wellesley, Ontario, Canada
- Applejack is an Uwe Rosenberg board game
- Glossary of dance moves#Apple Jacks dance move
