= Carton Brewing =

Brewery in Atlantic Highlands, New Jersey

- Type: Craft Brewery
- Location: 6 E Washington Ave, Atlantic Highlands, New Jersey, USA
- Opened: 2011
- Key people: Augie Carton & Chris Carton
- Distribution: New Jersey, New York, Pennsylvania, Connecticut
- Tasting: Tastings and tours on Wednesday through Sunday, certain holidays
- Website: cartonbrewing.com

Carton Brewing is a craft brewery in Atlantic Highlands in Monmouth County, New Jersey that produces beer, as well as barleywine. Founded in 2011, the brewery features a tasting room and retail store onsite.

Carton Brewing is one of the top selling craft beers in New Jersey, producing over 8,600 barrels a year.

== History ==
Carton Brewing was founded in 2011 by cousins Augie Carton and Chris Carton in Atlantic Highlands, New Jersey, the northernmost Jersey Shore town. This original location was a 5,000 sq ft red-brick historic warehouse.

In 2018, Carton opened a 10,000 sq ft facility, adjacent to the original location. The original location now serves as a retail store, a tasting room, and for the production of sour beer and saison in a 30-barrell Foeder.

Carton offers tours of their facilities on weekends and some weekdays.

== Products ==
Carton's core selection includes:

- "Boat Beer" a Session Ale
- "This Town" a Helles lager
- "077XX" an East Coast Double IPA
- "Carton of Milk" a session nitro milk stout
- "The Hook" a late-hopped wheated Pale ale
- "Brunch. Dinner. Grub. (B.D.G.)" a table ale

After moving into their new facility, Carton utilized its original space by repurposing it into a sour house.

Carton Brewing OWC is a new program focused on creating fine wild ales, sours, stouts and other beverages.

Carton also frequently collaborates with other breweries. Collaborators include Other Half Brewing Company, Trillium Brewing Company, Barrier Brewing Co., Interboro Spirits & Ales, Green Flash Brewing Company, Alpine Beer Company, Industrial Arts Brewing Company, Cape May Brewing Company, Bolero Snort Brewery, Against The Grain Brewery, Burial Beer Co., and Magnify Brewing Company. In 2018, Carton launched the collaborative &telier (a combination of & and atelier) label. &telier is an open-source term that can be used for collaboration between any breweries experimenting outside the bounds of their typical style of brewing.

== See also ==
- Alcohol laws of New Jersey
- Beer in New Jersey
- List of wineries, breweries, and distilleries in New Jersey
