= Jersey Spirits Distilling Co. =

Jersey Spirits Distilling Company
- Company type: Distillery
- Founded: 2015; 10 years ago
- Headquarters: Fairfield Township, Essex County, New Jersey

Jersey Spirits Distilling Company is a craft distillery located in Fairfield Township, Essex County, New Jersey, one of a handful of distilleries in New Jersey. Co-founders John Granata and Susan Lord together with Elizabeth MacDonald became licensed during the summer of 2015 and opened in August 2015.

Jersey Spirits is the first to distill and offer a true whiskey product in New Jersey since before prohibition with the Barnegat White Whiskey distilled from a bourbon mash. The product is minimally barrel aged to ensure the proper definition of Whiskey under the TTB guidelines. The operation creates small batches with local and regional raw materials.

== History ==
Jersey Spirits Distilling Company's Crossroads Bourbon Whiskey released in 2015 became the first legally released Bourbon to be made completely in New Jersey and sold in bottles since before Prohibition. Currently their products include vodka, white whiskey, rum, gin, bourbon and a naturally flavored line of distilled specialty spirits called Jersey Hooch. Additional Whiskies, Bourbons, Gins and Single Malt Whiskies are in the works which include a Gin flavored with New Jersey honey from a local apiary and a Maple White Whiskey with real NJ syrup. All of the products are named for actual places in New Jersey and include illustrations by a local New Jersey artist.

The operation is eco-conscious with the spend grains from distilling going to a Sussex County farm to feed cattle. The tasting room and manufacturing area utilizes materials reclaimed from barns and farms from in New Jersey. The distillery offers tours, tastings, cocktails and retail at their location during their operating hours. The company is in the process of distributing to bars, liquor stores and restaurants.

== See also ==
- New Jersey distilled spirits
