= New Jersey distilled spirits =

Small alcohol industry in American state

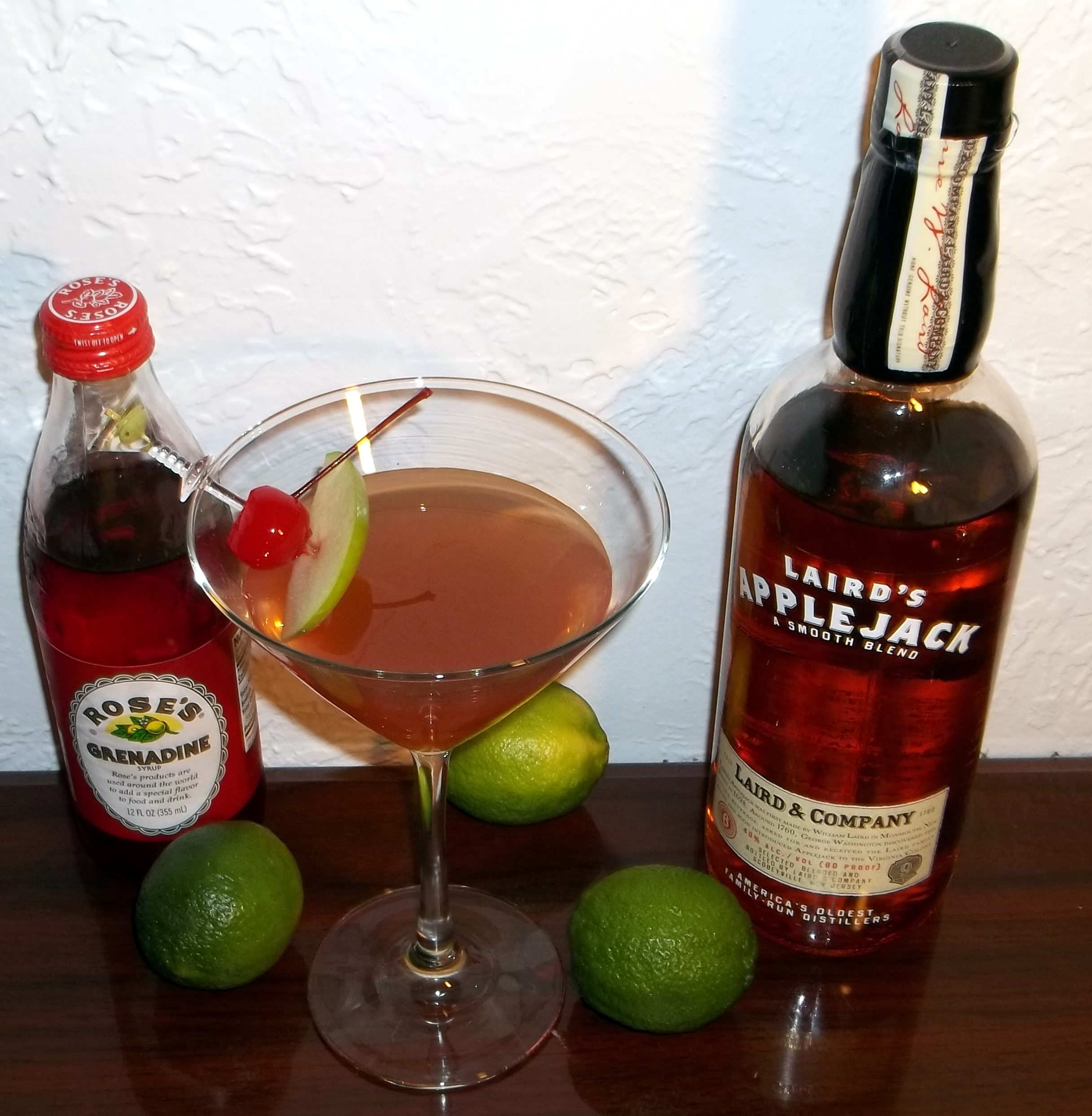
A "Jack Rose" cocktail is made from applejack and grenadine. Laird's is the only remaining producer of applejack in the United States.

The production of distilled spirits in New Jersey has not been a large industry in the state. Strict alcoholic beverage control laws in place during and after Prohibition (1919–1933) prevented the industry from growing for almost a century. In 2013, the state passed a law creating a craft distillery license. and issued the first new distillery license since Prohibition to Jersey Artisan Distilling.

== History ==
New Jersey has a long distilling history dating to the colonial era when large landowners converted surplus fruit into brandy, sugar into rum, and grain into whiskey. As of 2013, the state is home to two licensed distilleries. Laird & Company, in the Scobeyville section of Colts Neck, is the oldest licensed distillery in the United States, and received License No. 1 from the U.S. Department of the Treasury in 1780. By 1834, New Jersey boasted 388 distilleries.

In 2013, the New Jersey Division of Alcoholic Beverage Control issued its first distillery license in 94 years (since instituting Prohibition), to Jersey Artisan Distilling, based in Fairfield, in Essex County. That same year Cooper River Distillers in Camden received a state distillery license. Then in 2015 Jersey Spirits Distilling Co. received licensing and as of 2017 there are 20 craft distilleries in the state.

== Production ==
=== Manufacturers and products ===
New Jersey presently has several licensed distilleries, Laird & Company licensed with a Rectifier and Blender license, Jersey Artisan Distilling which has a Plenary Distillery license, Jersey Spirits Distilling Co, Corgi Spirits at The Jersey City Distillery, and All Points West Distillery which have Craft Distilling licenses. Laird is the nation's only remaining producer of applejack. Presently none of the company's distilling takes place in New Jersey. Laird's obtains all its apples from Virginia's Shenandoah Valley and distills its products in Virginia. Distilling at its New Jersey facilities ceased in 1972 and Laird's blends, ages and bottles its products in Scobeyville.

== Legal issues ==
=== Distillery licenses, regulation, and taxation ===
To operate in the state of New Jersey, distillery owners must first obtain licenses from the federal and state governments.

The Alcohol and Tobacco Tax and Trade Bureau (TTB) of the U.S. Department of the Treasury issues a permit for the operation of a distilled spirits plant in accordance with federal regulations, and the requirements of both the Federal Alcohol Administration Act and the Internal Revenue Code of 1986. The permit is issued after the approval of a filed application for the permit and a passing of an inspection of the distillery facilities by a federal government inspector. This permit allows the production, bottling, rectifying, processing and storage of distilled spirits and beverages. Examples of distilled spirits include neutral spirits or alcohol (i.e. vodka or grain spirits), whiskey, gin, brandy, blended applejack, rum, tequila, cordials and liqueurs.

New Jersey's laws and regulations regarding alcohol are overseen by the Department of Law and Public Safety's Division of Alcoholic Beverage Control (ABC), which is managed by the state's Attorney-General. The division issues licenses to distilleries to operate within the state, offering four distinct Class A Manufacturer's Licenses.

Federal excise taxes are levied on production of distilled spirits intended for human beverage consumption. Taxes are collected on undenatured distilled spirits, including those used manufacture of medicines, medicinal preparations, food products, flavors, flavoring extracts, and perfume and then drawnback (i.e. refunded) to the producer at the end of the fiscal year. Distilled spirits intended for industrial or research use that are denatured (i.e., treated with substances to make them unsuitable for human beverage consumption), or used by research laboratories, hospitals, universities and government agencies is exempt from federal excise taxes.

New Jersey excise taxes on distilled spirits for human beverage consumption are levied at a rate of $5.50 per gallon.

==== New Jersey Class A manufacturer's licenses for distilleries ====
Type of license	Activity permitted	Fee for license (As of 2019)
Plenary Distillery License (3a)	to manufacture any distilled alcoholic beverages; to rectify, blent, treat, or mix distilled alcoholic beverages; to sell to wholesalers in the state; to sell and distribute outside the state; to maintain a warehouse	Base license: $12,500
Limited Distillery License (3b)	manufacture alcoholic beverages made from fruit juices; to blend, treat, mix, compound with wine, and add sweetenings and flavors to make cordials and liqueurs; to sell to wholesalers in the state; to sell and distribute outside the state; to maintain a warehouse	Base license: $3,750
Supplementary Limited Distillery License (3c)	to bottle and rebottle alcoholic beverages distilled from fruit juices; to sell to wholesalers in the state; to sell and distribute outside the state; to maintain a warehouse	Base license: $313 per year for up to 5,000 gallons; $625 per year for 5,000–10,000 gallons; $1,250 without capacity limit
Craft Distillery License (3e)	to manufacture up to 20,000 gallons per year of any distilled alcoholic beverages; requires that a minimum of 51% of raw materials be grown or produced in New Jersey; to rectify, blend, treat, or mix distilled alcoholic beverages; to sell to wholesalers in the state; to sell and distribute outside the state; to maintain a warehouse; as part of a tour, sell distilled alcoholic beverages for on-site consumption; to offer samples to visitors; sell up to 5 liters of distilled alcoholic beverages for consumption off-premises; sale of food is absolutely prohibited	Base license: $938
Rectifier and Blender License (4)	to rectify, blend, treat, and mix distilled alcoholic beverages; to fortify, blend, and treat fermented alcoholic beverages; to sell to wholesalers in the state; to sell and distribute outside the state; to maintain a warehouse	Base license: $7,500

=== Direct shipping ===
Federal law prohibits alcoholic beverages from being shipped through the mail. New Jersey effectively prohibits the shipment of beer and spirits to customers by requiring a liquor license to transport alcohol, but not having any class of liquor license that grants permission to ship beer or spirits. United Parcel Service (UPS) and Federal Express will ship wine to a person's home, but will only deliver beer or hard liquor to a licensed business.

== See also ==
- Alcohol laws of New Jersey
- Beer in New Jersey
- List of wineries, breweries, and distilleries in New Jersey
- New Jersey Division of Alcoholic Beverage Control
- New Jersey wine
