= Hopewell Valley Vineyards =

American winery located in New Jersey

Coordinates: 40.337598°N 74.810516°W

- Location: 46 Yard Road, Pennington, New Jersey, USA
- Coordinates: 40.337598 N, 74.810516 W
- First vines planted: 2001
- Opened to the public: 2003
- Key people: Sergio & Violetta Neri (owners)
- Acres cultivated: 25
- Cases/yr: 6,000 (2011)
- Other products: olive oil, pizza
- Other attractions: picnicking permitted
- Distribution: on-site, wine festivals, NJ farmers' markets, NJ liquor stores, NJ restaurants, home shipment
- Tasting: tastings daily
- Website: http://hopewellvalleyvineyards.com/

Hopewell Valley Vineyards is a winery in Hopewell Township (mailing address is Pennington) in Mercer County, New Jersey. The vineyard was first planted in 2001, and opened to the public in 2003. Hopewell Valley has 25 acres of grapes under cultivation, and produces 6,000 cases of wine per year. The winery is named for the region where it is located.

== Wines and other products ==
Hopewell Valley Vineyards produces wine from Barbera, Brachetto, Cabernet Sauvignon, Chambourcin, Chardonnay, Merlot, Muscat blanc, Pinot gris, Sangiovese, and Vidal blanc grapes. Hopewell Valley also sells brick oven pizzas, and makes olive oil from olives grown in Tuscany. It is the only winery in New Jersey that produces wine from Brachetto, which is a red vinifera grape indigenous to the Piedmont region of Italy that is often used to make sparkling wines. Hopewell Valley is not located within one of New Jersey's three viticultural areas.

== Licensing and associations ==
Hopewell Valley has a plenary winery license from the New Jersey Division of Alcoholic Beverage Control, which allows it to produce an unrestricted amount of wine, operate up to 15 off-premises sales rooms, and ship up to 12 cases per year to consumers in-state or out-of-state. The winery is a member of the Garden State Wine Growers Association.

== Controversy and advocacy ==
Hopewell Valley has had conflicts with municipal authorities regarding the sale of food, and the hosting of events at the winery. The Hopewell Township council expressed concerns that the winery created excessive noise and traffic, and was functioning as an unlicensed restaurant. In 2011, the Mercer County Agriculture Development Board and the New Jersey Agriculture Development Committee decided that the winery could sell snack foods (e.g., cheese, pizza) and hold wine festivals, but could not serve meals or host weddings or other catered events without the town's permission. Although Hopewell Valley Vineyards is not on preserved farmland, it has advocated changing state law to allow more events to be held by preserved farms.

== See also ==
- Alcohol laws of New Jersey
- American wine
- Judgment of Princeton
- List of wineries, breweries, and distilleries in New Jersey
- New Jersey Farm Winery Act
- New Jersey Wine Industry Advisory Council
- New Jersey wine
