= The Applejacks (Dutch band) =

Indie rock band

The Applejacks are an indie rock band from Amsterdam, Netherlands.

== History ==
The group formed in 2008, released their first recording in 2009. Their song "The Only Thing You Need" is included in the soundtrack of the movie Lover of Loser, produced by Shooting Star. The version in the movie was recorded by Acda en de Munnik; in October 2008 they performed the song live on television.

In 2009, the band won the Best of the West competition, and in 2009 they were finalists on The Next Stage. Also in 2009, they were in the top three in Kunstbende competition in Amsterdam. In June 2009 they performed in the Ancient Belgique in Brussels, Belgium, and then in the Melkweg; Amsterdam, as part of the final battle of "The Next Stage."

== Personnel ==
- Vincent van Outersterp (guitar, keytar, and vocals)
- Hugo de Jonge (guitar, blues harp, and vocals)
- Joris van Roozendaal (bass)
- Oscar Sanders (drums).
