= The Next Stage =

The Next Stage is a Belgian non-profit organisation that organises a concerts for unsigned talent in the best clubs over Belgium and the Netherlands. It is being held in 10 provinces: (in 2009) North Holland, South Holland, Gelderland, Limburg, Utrecht, North Brabant, Antwerp, Flemish Brabant, Hainaut en West Flanders.

Musicians play in a sort of Battle of the Bands-format, whereby the bands with the most votes move on to the next round. In between shows, the bands get courses and workshops to teach them how to be more successful in promoting their band. The 10 winners of each provincial final will move on to the 'main event' : a big live concert organised by Exit Live Stage.
