= Climax Brewing =

Brewery based in New Jersey

- Founded: 1994
- Headquarters: Roselle Park, New Jersey, United States
- Website: climaxbrewing.com

The Climax Brewing Company is an American brewery founded in 1994 by Dave Hoffman. The facility officially opened February 1996 and is located in Roselle Park, New Jersey. The brewery was founded by Dave Hoffman, owner of the now closed Brewmeister home brew store in Cranford, NJ, in the back of his father's, Kurt Hoffman, machine shop. This make Climax New Jersey's oldest microbrewery. Its beers are distributed throughout Pennsylvania, New Jersey, Brooklyn, New York City, Washington DC and Virginia.

== Awards and Accolades ==
Climax ESB has been listed as a top American beer by Stuff Magazine and Michael Jackson's Ultimate Beer. Hoffmann Cream Ale and IPA have also been given accolades by Jackson. In the Star Ledger's Malt Madness competition, Hoffmann Helles won the Lagers/Pilsners Category and Hoffmann Hefeweizen was in the Final 4 for Wheats/Whites.

== See also ==
- List of wineries, breweries, and distilleries in New Jersey
