= Conserve Wildlife Foundation of New Jersey =

US nonprofit organization

- Conserve Wildlife Foundation of New Jersey Inc
- Abbreviation: CWF
- Type: Nonprofit
- Tax ID no.: 22-3130406
- Legal status: 501(c)(3)
- Purpose: Wildlife conservation
- Location: Princeton, New Jersey
- Trustee President: Al Newman
- Executive Director: Liz Silvernail
- Website: http://www.conservewildlifenj.org/

The Conserve Wildlife Foundation of New Jersey (CWF) is a nonprofit organization based in Princeton, New Jersey, and their work consists of protecting the endangered species of wildlife that live, breed, and migrate through New Jersey. CWF is a part of the Guidestar nonprofit database and provides the public with information about their organization.

== Conservation projects ==
CWF has conservation projects throughout the state of New Jersey which include different endangered species. They assist in statewide projects such as updating New Jersey’s Threatened and Endangered Species list.

Amphibian Crossing Project

During the late winter and spring months, CWF biologists and volunteers work to protect spring-breeding amphibians like the wood frog, spotted salamander, jefferson salamander, and spring peeper during their migrations to vernal pools where they breed. On rainy nights in the spring, volunteers help amphibians with crossing hazardous roads at specific sites and they collect data on the numbers of amphibians and the species seen and they record traffic patterns as well. CWF works on six sites, which are spread out in three New Jersey counties. High traffic roads at these sites are closed down to be able to protect and move the amphibians to their breeding areas on the other side of the road.

Bald Eagle Project

CWF assists in managing New Jersey's population of bald eagles. CWF's biologists work on managing and reducing disturbance in eagle habitats. There is a live webcam called the Eaglecam that can be viewed from January to July that is placed above a bald eagle nest inside Duke Farms in Hillsborough, New Jersey.

Bat Projects:

Summer Bat Count Project

CWF has a Summer Bat Count project were data is collected to understand of how NJ's bats are distributed, what conditions they choose for roosting, and how their populations may be changing over time.

Acoustic Bat Monitoring Project

CWF uses two AnaBat acoustic detectors to aid in bat research across the state of New Jersey.

Indiana Bat Forestry Project

CWF works with forest landowners to perform silviculture management practices to benefit indiana bats. This bat species was added to New Jersey's endangered and threatened species list in 2012.

White-Nose Syndrome Research

Because of the decrease in bat populations caused by white nose syndrome, the US Fish and Wildlife Service and many states including New Jersey, have been studying bat colonies during the summer and winter months. They studying and learning about causes and consequences of the disease.

Beach Nesting Bird Project

CWF assists with the recovery of beach nesting bird species including piping plovers, least terns, black skimmers, American oystercatchers and red knots. Beach management plans are implemented to decrease negative impacts on these birds. During the summer months, CWF biologists and volunteers keep track of the number of nesting birds and fence nesting areas to keep predators away. CWF biologists also collect data and band the shorebirds to track populations, predict their reproductive success and predict future threats against these birds.

Bog Turtle Project

CWF assists with the restoration and enhancement of bog turtle habitats in New Jersey. Biologists visit bog turtle sites and evaluate their habitat's status. Bog turtle habitats are susceptible to dangerous side effects by invasive plants. Some methods used to control these problems are using wetland approved herbicides, and controlled grazing by farm animals.

Calling Amphibian Monitoring Project

CWF assesses the health and population status of New Jersey's amphibians.

CWF works on projects with the state of New Jersey Department of Environmental Protection. One of their collaborative projects was a study of an amphibian fungus called the chytrid fungus, which has been harming amphibian populations around the world.

Freshwater Invertebrates Project

CWF surveys for freshwater invertebrates across the state of New Jersey and evaluates their population status.

Grassland Project

CWF works to manage and protect grasslands areas. CWF provides farmers and land managers with the knowledge on good habitat management.

Great Bay Terrapin Project

Great Bay Boulevard in Little Egg Harbor, Ocean County, New Jersey is where CWF established the Great Bay Terrapin Project in 2010. It is within Great Bay Blvd. Wildlife Management Area, which mainly consists of emergent saltmarsh habitat and almost 6,000 acres in size. The goal of the Great Bay Terrapin Project is to reduce roadkills of adult female terrapins, which cross the road to seek out nest sites.

International Shorebird Project

CWF works with the International Shorebird Team to monitor, research and recover species of shorebirds including the red knot. This project starts from the Delaware Bayshore area to Florida, Texas and goes as far as Chile.

CWF biologists also work to protect horseshoe crab populations in New Jersey because their eggs are a main food source for some of these migratory bird species.

CWF assists the New Jersey Department of Environmental Protection with raising awareness in the community about shorebird conservation issues.

Osprey Project

Conservation work began in the 1970s for ospreys. CWF helps monitor and manage the population of ospreys in New Jersey. CWF staff and volunteers have put up over 200 osprey nesting platforms throughout New Jersey's coastal areas since 2004, after they took on a larger role in their management. The majority of these wood nesting platforms are also maintained by CWF staff and volunteers. Each summer, CWF and volunteers conduct nesting surveys to determine occupancy and outcomes of nests and nesting pairs. CWF staff and volunteers band around 25-30% of nestlings produced each year.

Peregrine Project

CWF helps monitor the peregrine falcon population in New Jersey. Maintenance is performed on nest sites during the winter and in the spring, the nests are monitored for activity. During nest visits biologists place remote cameras and use digital cameras with telephoto lenses to capture images of USGS bird bands, which allow birds to be identified. This allows them to be able to learn more about their life history, including their age, site fidelity, and the turnover rate of the population.

Seal Research and Conservation

CWF works with Stockton University to develop conservation plans for seals in New Jersey. CWF's biologists protect winter colonies and haul-out areas used by seals. Haul-out areas offer seals a resting place and protection from predators. CWF's staff monitors the seals at the haul-out sites, collect data on abundance, habitat use, and disturbance.

== Habitat protection projects ==
CWF protects various habitat areas throughout the state of New Jersey. A couple of the protected habitats are the Ballanger creek habitat enhancement project and Hillsborough parks diversity project. CWF assists the New Jersey Department of Environmental Protection with many habitat restoration projects. The goal of these projects is to increase the population of endangered species that live in the area.

== Educational programs ==
Species on the Edge Art and Essay Contest

CWF has a contest between 5th grade students in New Jersey were they draw an endangered animal and write a small essay about that animal. The best drawings are chosen and those children's pictures are recognized in a yearly calendar which CWF creates.

Speakers Bureau Program

This program offers organized groups a one-hour PowerPoint presentation about New Jersey’s endangered wildlife species and how CWF works to protect them.

Sedge Island Summer Field Experience

CWF and the NJ Division of Fish & Wildlife have a two-week summer field program for New Jersey students in grades 7-9 who are interested in exploring New Jersey’s salt marsh environment.
