= Scobeyville, New Jersey =

Populated place in Monmouth County, New Jersey, US

- Unincorporated community
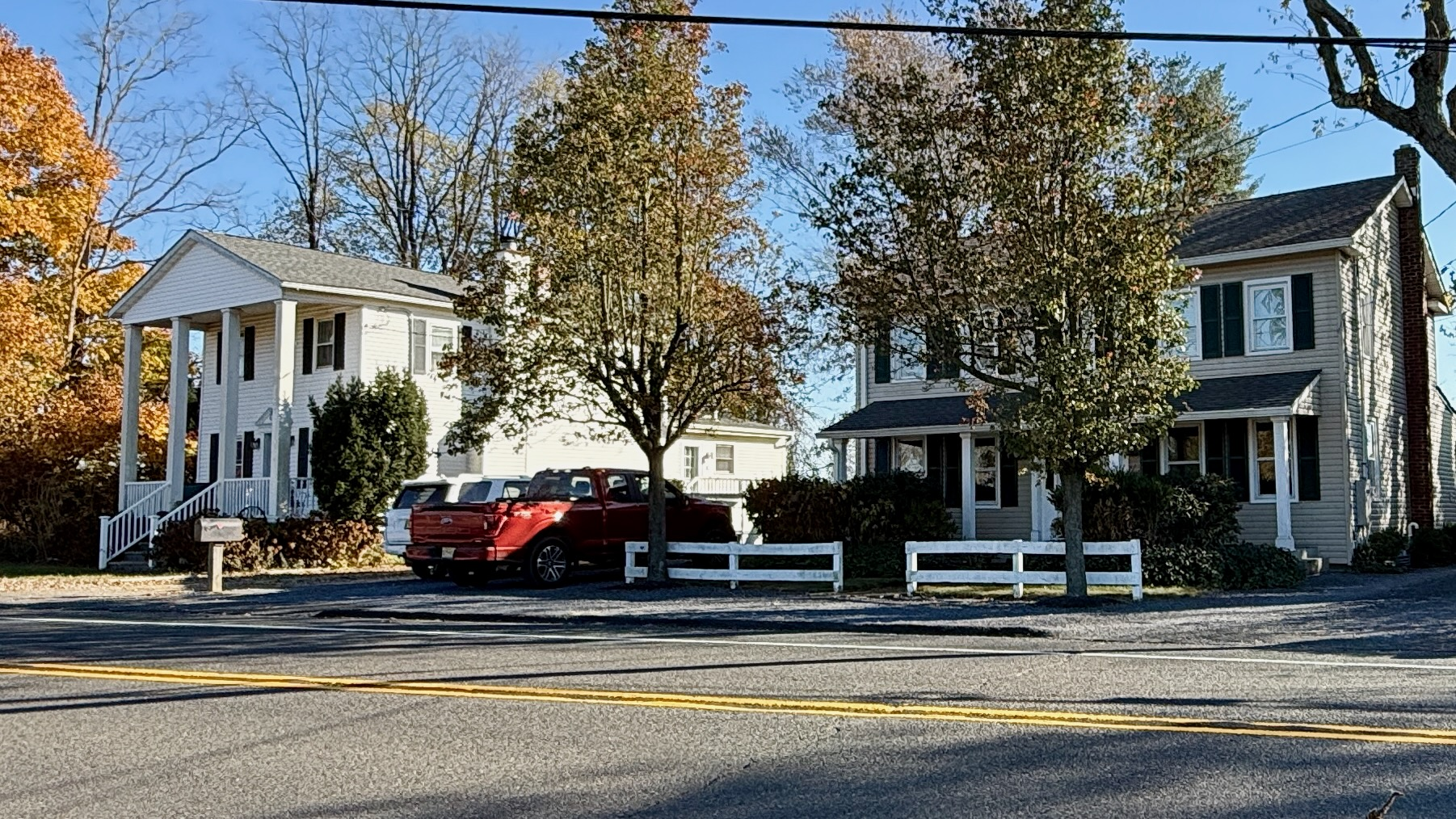
- Intersection of Laird Road and CR 537

- Location of Scobeyville in Monmouth County Inset: Location of county within the state of New Jersey Scobeyville (New Jersey) Scobeyville (the United States)
- Coordinates: 40°17′49″N 74°08′36″W
- Country: United States
- State: New Jersey
- County: Monmouth
- Township: Colts Neck
- Named for: Scobey family
- Elevation: 72 ft (22 m)
- Time zone: UTC−05:00 (Eastern (EST))
  - Summer (DST): UTC−04:00 (EDT)
- ZIP Code: 07722
- GNIS feature ID: 880423

Scobeyville is an unincorporated community located within Colts Neck Township in Monmouth County, in the U.S. state of New Jersey. The settlement is named for the Scobey family which has inhabited the township since the 1700s. The site housed a one-room schoolhouse, a post office, and a general store. It was known for good fishing on the Yellow Brook which has its basin in Scobyville.

== Schools ==
In 1820 a schoolhouse stood in Scobyville on lands owned by Daniel Polhemus on the west corner of County Route 537 and Hockhockson Road. In 1851, another school building replaced the old one and was built on the Thomas Guest property (now Dorbrook Farm.) This school structure was considered inadequate in 1916 following changes to state law and was disused after that time. This structure burned in 1929.

== Public transportation ==
In 1930, a bus route was established between Freehold and Red Bank. This line provided residents of Scobyville connection points for most parts of the country.

== Business ==
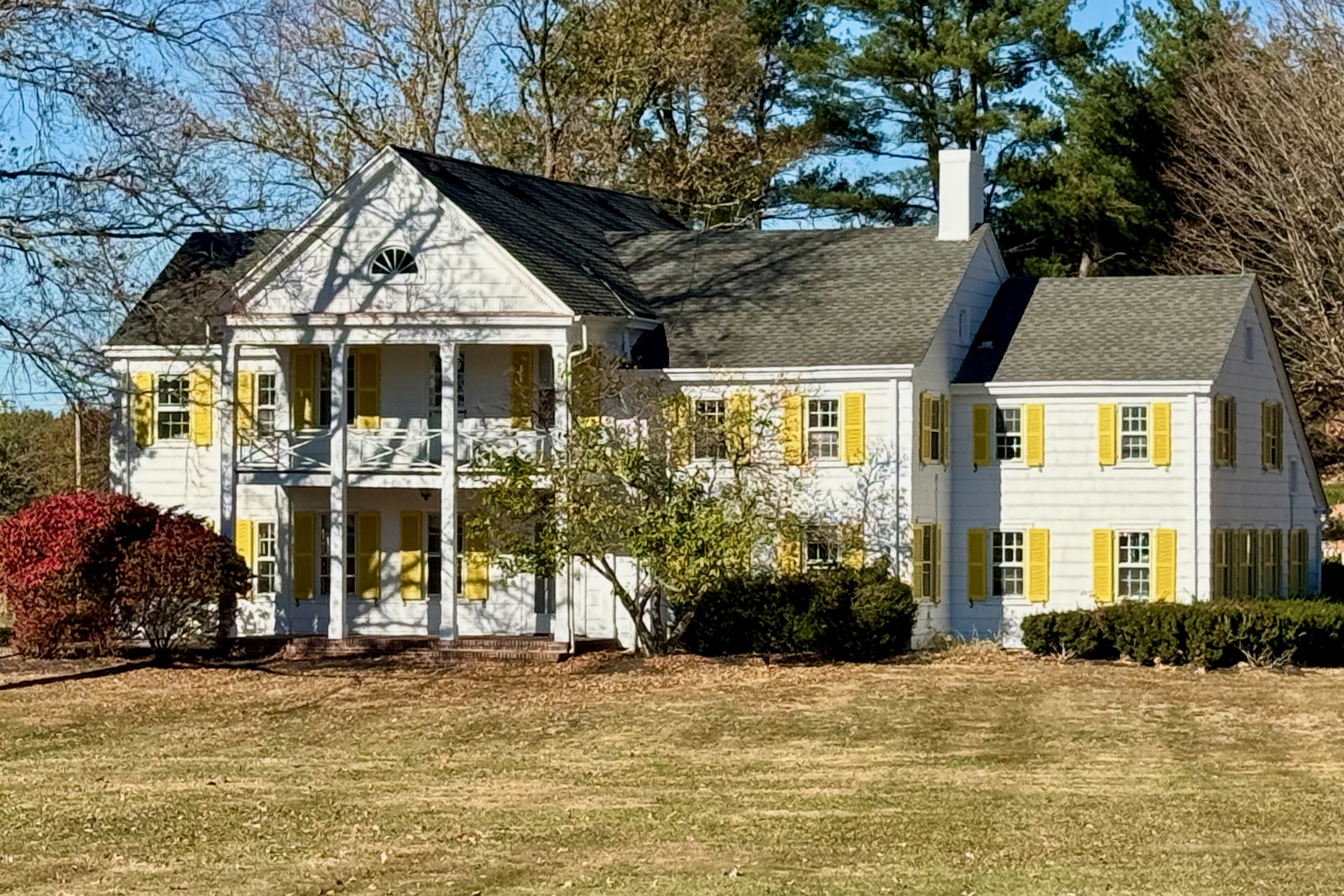
Laird & Company administrative office at 1 Laird Road

A fanning mill factory was established by JHS Parke in Scobeyville. It was closed prior to 1913 when a harvesting machine was created.

In 1928, a high powered Marconi wireless station was established here by the Universal Wireless Communications Company on the Hance Farm 500 yards south of Route 537. It was used mostly to broadcast stock orders for Wall Street and other exchanges. A 73-by-53-foot (22 by 16 m) concrete block building was created with an antenna at a cost of $100,000. It was operational in March 1929. However, in 1930, the company filed for bankruptcy and the station closed when the Radio Board revoked the frequencies held by the company.

The Stratford Pen Corporation bought the block building which housed the Wireless station in 1947. Following closing, the building was used for Apple Jack production but in 1947, was purchased as a building for ball point pen research.

A commercial canning factory was started in 1862, Bucklin was noted for his inventiveness in the canning industry holding multiple patents for automating can fillers and pressure cookers The "My Choice" brand was canned in Scobeyville till 1943, when the owner C.S. Bucklin retired.

The canning plant was sold to the Laird Corporation and they continued canning for the "War Effort" till the end of the war when the plant closed.

Laird & Company (America's Oldest Distillery) is located in Scobeyville.

== Farming ==
The area is largely known for agricultural products. In 1915, Scobyville had the largest fruit farm in Monmouth County, owned by Frederick Lerch. It covered 100 acres (40 ha), all of it devoted to fruit trees. He was known to produce up to 40,000 baskets of fruit from his orchard. Initially peach trees, in 1917 he converted his entire orchard to apple trees. The area was also known for the Brook Turkey farm.

An apple farm set up by William Laird was located in Scobeyville; the cider produced there were fermented into hard cider and applejack. The distillery operated in Scobeyville from the 1790s to Prohibition and then again since 1933. The Laird family continues to operate an apple distillery in Scobeyville. The distillery was visited by the Archduke Franx Joef Von Habsburg of Austria and his Duchess during a good will tour in 1937. In addition to the Laird & Company distillery, the remainder of the area today consists of farmland and the Dorbrook Recreational Area. County Route 537 is the main east–west road running through the area while Laird Road heads north from CR 537.

Scobeyville was also the production site of "Choc Corporation" which produced chocolate milk. This was a separate enterprise from the Laird applejack operation and the main office was on Broadway in New York; but housed at the site of the same cider mill which produced the applejack. The milk had a nationwide advertising budget.

In 1932, the Laird Farm brought suit against another company which copied their specific apple shaped jug. They had a patent issued for this design.

=== Infestation ===
- Most of the farms in the area were significantly affected by cutworms in 1910. Much of the cabbage and tomato plants in the area were heavily damaged.
- In 1937, Army worms provided large damage with the crops that year.

=== Volstead Act violations ===
There were a number of Volstead Act violations in Scobyville during Prohibition.

- On January 22, 1931, 18 tons of sugar and 500 US gallons (1,900 L) of alcohol were confiscated by federal agents and state police at the Shady Rest Farm. The stills could not be located. The barn was used for storage and distribution for other manufacturing in the area.
- March 1931, Federal agents found a 75,000-US-gallon (280,000 L) still with large quantities of mash at the Leon Hardy farm on Hominy Hills road.

== Problem with Post Office ==
Owing to the lack of a postmaster, the Post Office officially abolished the mail delivery to Scobyville in 1914. At that time, residents had to obtain their mail from Eatontown; a distance of more than 5 miles (8.0 km). After some controversy, and intervention by Congressman Thomas J. Scully, a rural free delivery route was established for the residents by the postal service.
