= Flying Fish Brewing =

Craft brewery in Somerdale, New Jersey

Coordinates: 39.9121°N 74.9693°W

Flying Fish Brewing Company
- Founded: 1995
- Headquarters: Somerdale, New Jersey, United States
- Production output: ~30,000 U.S. barrels
- Website: flyingfish.com

Flying Fish Brewing Company is a craft brewery based in Somerdale, New Jersey. Founded in 1995 by Gene Muller in Cherry Hill, it moved to its Somerdale location in 2012. It is today the largest craft brewery in New Jersey.

== History ==
Flying Fish was established in 1995 as the world's first virtual microbrewery, something novel that drew a lot of attention. Flying Fish sold their product completely over the internet and shipped it to the customers location. Capitalizing on this early notoriety, founder Gene Muller took Flying Fish into brick and mortar, constructing the first microbrewery in South Jersey. Following his success online, Muller partnered with Andrew Newell to help secure funding for a permanent establishment. While New Jersey once boasted more than 50 breweries, Flying Fish was the first new brewery built in South Jersey in more than 50 years.

After opening in 1996, Flying Fish hit financial trouble due to a craft brewing bubble that popped. Many of the craft breweries closed down due to lack of profit and over saturation of the market. With this level of competition, Muller recalls the time as very difficult to stay afloat. Flying Fish was able to gain more funding so it could buy a larger volume of packaging, making their pricing more competitive in the market and was able to stay open.

Business grew, and Flying Fish began to produce a range of beers year-round, along with a variety of seasonal specialties. Flying Fish beers are ten-time medal winners at the Great American Beer Festival, the most of any New Jersey brewery. In 2012, Flying Fish moved from Cherry Hill to its new facility in Somerdale, making it the largest brewery built in the state since prohibition. The transition saw Flying Fish go from a 10,000 square ft. to 45,000 square ft. building and increase productivity from 20 barrels to 50 barrels at a time. However, due to new automation in the Somerdale location it has been able to brew three times the amount of beer in less time. The tasting room at Somerdale offers weekly one-off and barrel aged beers.

On November 9, 2017, Flying Fish announced that Lou Romano, who began working in the beer business at age 16 and most recently at Oskar Blues Brewery, where he served as National Sales Manager since 2013, would replace Muller as the company's president.

On December 29, 2023, Flying Fish Brewing declared Chapter 11 bankruptcy. The assets were purchased by Guilford Hall Brewery, from Baltimore, MD. The taproom will be closed and production moved to Maryland.

== Community and charity ==
This facility boasts many sustainability features, to increase water and energy conservation, to brew the award-winning beer in the most environmentally friendly way possible. In 2014 Flying Fish worked alongside the Conserve Wildlife Foundation of New Jersey in an effort to help educate locals about the Piping Plover "Bahamas Project" and showed a connection between The Bahamas and the U.S. for the endangered beach nesting bird species.

Flying Fish is also known for its ties to the community: each year, the company donates more than $100,000 in goods, services and merchandise to local nonprofit causes. Flying Fish also has partnered with Great American Brewery Runs, an organization that partners with local breweries to host festivals and charity runs. Flying Fish hosts the "Flying Fish 5k" at its Somerdale location. In 2013, following the events of Hurricane Sandy, Flying Fish crafted a new hybrid beer called "Forever Unloved Sandy" in which all proceeds went to charitable efforts to restore New Jersey.

== Products ==
Regular seasonal drafts are the Oktoberfish, Farmhouse Golden Ale, and Grand Cru Winter Reserve. The latter two are bottle-conditioned. Less available (often only in growlers at the brewery) are Big Fish Barleywine, a Coffee Porter, Love Fish (a cherry-infused Belgian Abbey Dubbel available around Valentine's Day), Black Fish, and Imperial Espresso Porter. In January 2012, Flying Fish added Red Fish, a hoppy red ale, to its lineup.

In the summer of 2004, Flying Fish produced a blueberry flavored Abbey Dubbel available only in 1/6 kegs to recipients of the brewery's mailing list.

First in the region to be featured at the Great British Beer Festival, Flying Fish has also been featured at the Oregon Brewers Festival and Canada's Biere de Mondial Festival and has also won several medals at both the Real Ale Festival in Chicago and the World Beer Championships.

=== Exit series ===
In 2009, Flying Fish began releasing a series of beers named after New Jersey Turnpike exits, each in styles intended to represent the part of the state served by that exit. New beers in the series are released at variable intervals, usually several months apart, with an extended hiatus as Flying Fish moved into their new facility in 2012. The inaugural release in the series honored the brewery's home exit, Exit 4, in March 2009.

The Exit Series generated some controversy with the New Jersey chapter of MADD criticizing an implied association between driving and alcohol.

Exit Series releases
Exit	Name	Release date
Exit 4	American Tripel	March 2009
Exit 11	Hoppy American Wheat	July 2009
Exit 1	Bayshore Oyster Stout	October 2009
Exit 16	Wild Rice Double IPA	March 2010
Exit 6	Wallonian Rye	June 2010
Exit 13	Chocolate Stout	December 2010
Exit 9	Hoppy Scarlet Ale	March 2011
Exit 8	Chestnut Brown Ale	February 2012
Exit 3	Blueberry Braggot	February 2015
Exit 15	Coffee IPA	October 2015
Exit 18	Baltic Porter	February 2016
Exit 5	Pinelands Sour Forage Ale	September 2016
Exit 7	Pork Roll Porter	September 2016
Exit 14	Imperial Pilsner	September 2016
Exit 2	Rosemary Double IPA	February 2017
Exit 12	Maibock	May 2017

== See also ==
- Barrel-aged beer
