= Applejack (drink) =

Alcoholic drink produced from apples

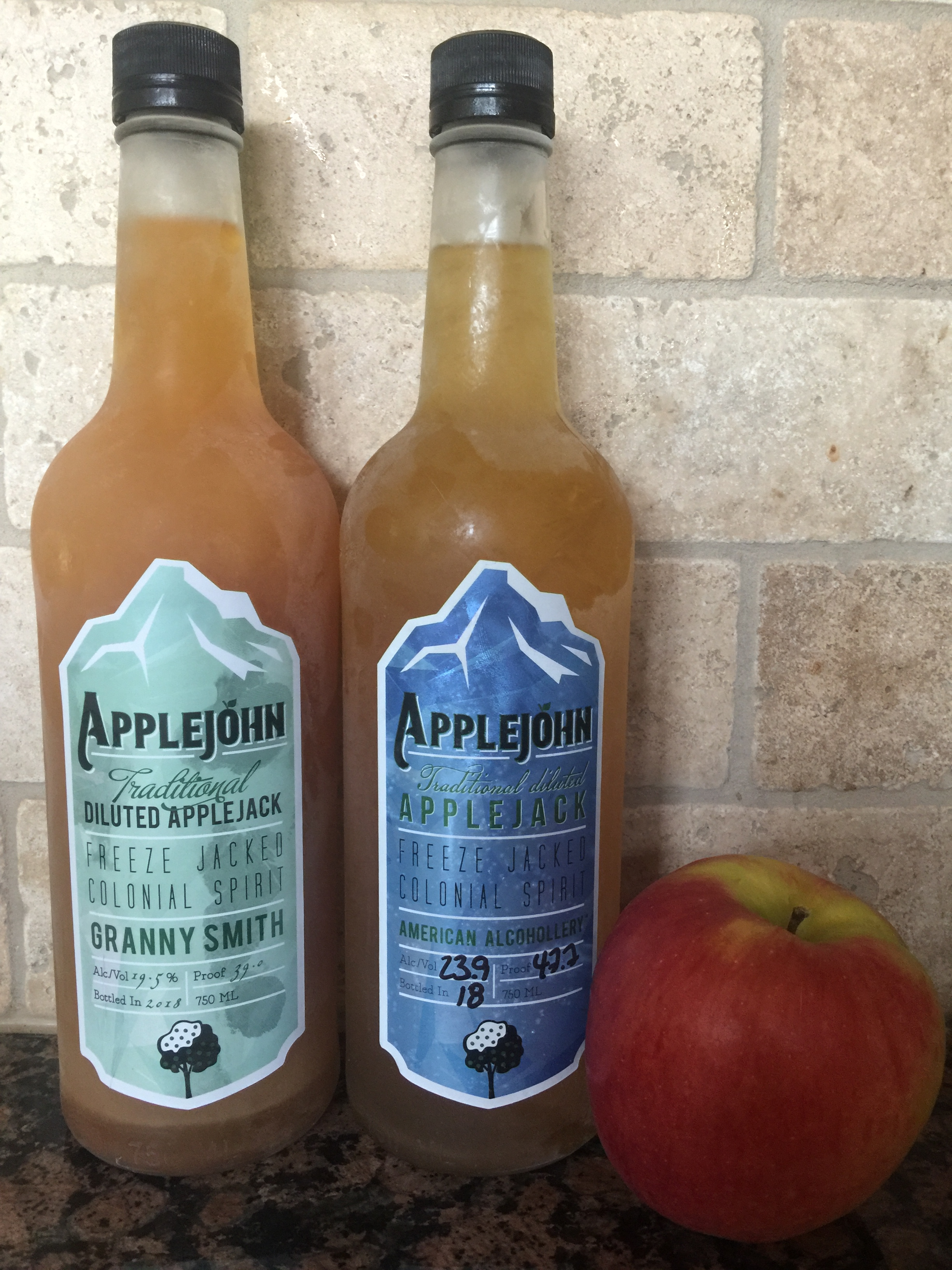
Bottles of applejack demonstrating the apple cider-like coloration of the spirit with an apple to the bottles' right

Applejack is a type of apple brandy traditionally associated with the American colonial era and is generally considered to be one of the United States' "original" spirits. Applejack was traditionally created via freeze distilling (or "jacking") hard apple cider or apple wine and while homebrewing methods may still involve freeze distillation, modern professional brewers use standard distillation processes.

Very popular in the early- to mid-colonial era, the drink's prevalence declined in the 17th- and 18th-centuries amid competition from other alcoholic spirits as they became easier to manufacture. Applejack experienced a revival during the Prohibition era, primarily due to the drink's ease-of-manufacture, but again declined in prevalence after the repeal of Prohibition. It experienced another resurgence in popularity in the mid-2010s and early-2020s.

Applejack is generally considered to be a type of brandy and is, in the United States, legally classified as such. Applejack is used in several cocktails, including the Jack Rose.

== History ==
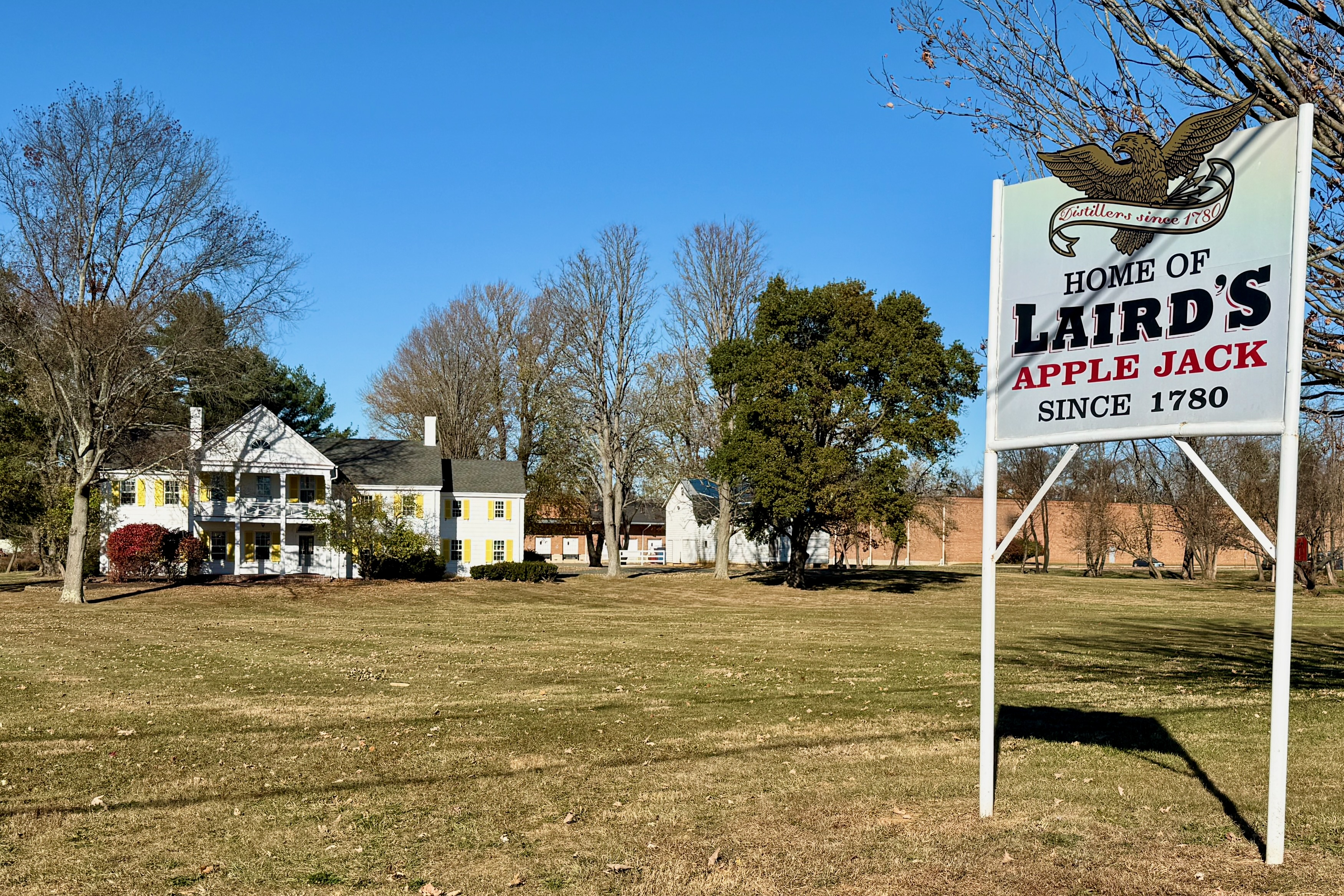
Laird's Apple Jack sign in Scobeyville

Applejack was first produced in colonial New Jersey in 1698 by William Laird, a Scots American who settled in Monmouth County. The drink was once known as Jersey Lightning. Laird's great-grandson, Robert Laird, who served in the Continental Army, incorporated Laird's Distillery in 1780, after previously operating a tavern. The oldest licensed applejack distillery in the United States, Laird & Company of Scobeyville, New Jersey, was, until the 2000s, the country's only remaining producer of applejack and continues to dominate applejack production.

Once popular in early America, applejack declined in popularity as other spirits became easier to manufacture commercially, including rum and whiskey (especially bourbon) in the 19th century and gin, vodka, and tequila in the 20th century. In 1920, with the start of the Prohibition era, Laird's ended liquor production and began producing apple juice. In 1931, John Evans Laird received permission to produce apple brandy for "medicinal purposes" and stockpiled its product until the repeal of Prohibition in 1933.

Applejack has been associated with four presidents of the United States: after the American Revolution, George Washington requested from Robert Laird his family's recipe for applejack; Abraham Lincoln served it during a brief stint as a tavern keeper in Springfield, Illinois; Franklin D. Roosevelt included applejack in the Manhattans he regularly consumed; and Lyndon B. Johnson gave a case of applejack to Soviet leader Alexei Kosygin in the 1967 Glassboro Summit Conference.

In the 2010s, a number of smaller craft distilleries began to produce applejack in places such as New Hampshire, Pennsylvania's Lehigh Valley, New York's Hudson Valley, Holland, Michigan, and in Toronto.

== Production ==
=== Home-made ===
The name applejack derives from the traditional method of producing the drink, jacking, which is the process of freezing fermented cider and then removing the ice to increase the alcohol content. Cider produced after the fall harvest was left outside during the winter. Periodically, the ice chunks that had formed were removed, thereby concentrating the unfrozen alcohol in the remaining liquid. An alternative method involved placing a cask of hard cider in snow, allowing ice to form on the inside of the cask as the contents began to freeze, and then tapping the cask and pouring off the still-liquid portion of the contents. Starting with fermented juice containing less than 10% alcohol, the concentrated product can contain 25–40% alcohol. Because freeze distillation is a low-infrastructure method of production compared to evaporative distillation and does not require burning firewood to generate heat, hard cider and applejack were historically easier to produce, though more expensive than grain alcohol.

The disadvantage of freeze distillation, also called fractional crystallization, is that the substances remaining after the removal of the water include not only ethanol, but also harmful methanol, esters, aldehydes, and fusel alcohols. In modern times, reducing methanol with the absorption of a molecular sieve is a practical method for production.

=== Commercial ===
When commercial production began, applejack was also being produced by evaporative distillation. Modern commercially produced applejack is often no longer produced by jacking but rather by blending apple brandy and neutral grain spirits.

== Comparison to calvados ==
Applejack is somewhat similar to calvados, an apple brandy from Normandy, France, and is often compared to it. However, calvados is made from cider apples, while applejack is made from apples such as Winesap.

== See also ==
- Cider
- Ice beer
