= Beer in New Jersey =

The production of beer in New Jersey has been in a state of recovery since Prohibition (1919-1933) and the Great Depression (1929-1945). Currently, the state has 123 licensed breweries: a large production brewery owned by an international beverage company, Anheuser-Busch InBev, and 122 independent microbreweries and 19 brewpubs. The growth of the microbreweries and brewpubs since the 1990s has been aided by the loosening of the state's licensing restrictions and strict alcohol control laws, many of which were a legacy of Prohibition.

== History ==
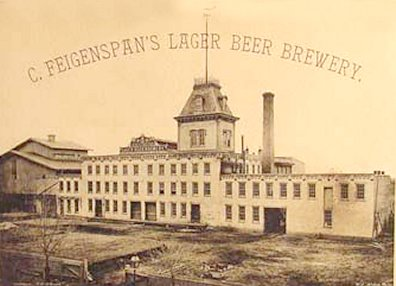
The C. Feigenspan Brewery in Newark, New Jersey, c. 1890-1900

The first brewery in New Jersey was established in a fledgling settlement of Pavonia in what is now Hoboken when the state was part the Dutch New Netherland colony. It was short-lived and destroyed by a band of Lenape in 1643 during Governor Kieft's War (1643-1645). Large German immigrant populations in Newark and Jersey City led to the establishment of a healthy brewing industry in the nineteenth and early twentieth centuries. Brewing beer became the fourth-largest industry in Newark, and names like Kruger, Hensler, and Feigenspan were among the leading industrial families in Newark.

Later, regional (and later national) brands Ballantine, and Rheingold, and Pabst, among others operated large breweries in Newark and surrounding towns. With accusations of German propaganda and persecution of German-Americans during World War I, many of the state's brewers relocated to the American midwest. Prohibition closed many of the remaining breweries in the state. For instance, of Newark's 27 breweries before Prohibition, none of them exist today. As the industry reorganized and consolidated in the 1970s and 1980s to compete nationally, brewers like Ballantine (in the 1960s), Rheingold (1977), and Pabst (1985) closed their doors.

One of the nation's first modern craft breweries was Vernon Valley Brewery, which was opened in 1985 by Gene Mulvihill, in the old Action Park amusement park. . The brewery closed in 1992.

Presently, the state is home to one large-production brewery, Anheuser-Busch in Newark, which opened in 1951 and is used for brewing Budweiser and Rolling Rock. New Jersey offers a limited brewery license for microbreweries and a restricted brewery license for brewpubs that has allowed the industry to grow in recent years. In 1995, the Ship Inn Restaurant and Brewery in Milford became the first brewpub in New Jersey. In 1996, David Hoffman opened what is the oldest of the current craft microbreweries in the state called Climax Brewing in Roselle Park, then followed shortly afterward by High Point Brewing. In 2016, New Jersey craft brewers produced 111,416 barrels of craft brew. In 2012, New Jersey liberalized its licensing laws to allow microbreweries to sell beer by the glass as part of a tour, and sell up to 15.5 gallons (i.e., a keg) for off-premises consumption. The same legislation permits brewpubs to brew up to 10,000 barrels of beer per year, and sell to wholesalers and at festivals.

== Brewery licenses and regulation ==
Breweries in the state of New Jersey must obtain licenses from the Alcohol and Tobacco Tax and Trade Bureau (TTB) of the U.S. Department of the Treasury, and from the New Jersey Division of Alcoholic Beverage Control. New Jersey taxes beer at a rate of 12 cents per gallon.

=== New Jersey Class A manufacturer's licenses for breweries ===
Type of License	Activity permitted	Fee for license (As of 2019)
Plenary Brewery License (1a)	to brew any malt alcoholic beverage; to sell to wholesalers and at festivals in the state; to sell and distribute out of state; to maintain a warehouse	Base license: $10,625
Limited Brewery License (1b)	to brew any malt beverage, not in excess of 300,000 barrels (31-gallon barrels) per year; to sell to wholesalers and at festivals in the state; to sell and distribute out of state; as part of a tour, sell beer for on-site consumption; to offer samples to visitors; to sell up to 15.5 gallons of beer (i.e. a keg) for consumption off-premises; sale of food is absolutely prohibited; to maintain a warehouse	Base license: $1,250 for up to 50,000 barrels; $2,500 for 50,000–100,000 barrels; $5,000 for 100,000–200,000 barrels; $7,500 for 200,000–300,000 barrels
Restricted Brewery License (1c)	to brew any malt beverage, not in excess of 10,000 barrels per year; only for businesses with a Plenary Retail Consumption License and a dining facility; limit of 10 licenses to be held by a person; to offer samples at off-premises charitable or civic events; to sell on-premises, to wholesalers, and at festivals in the state	Base license: $1,000 for first 1,000 barrels; $250 for each additional 1,000 barrels

== See also ==
- Alcohol laws of New Jersey
- Beer in the United States
- List of wineries, breweries, and distilleries in New Jersey
- New Jersey distilled spirits
- New Jersey Division of Alcoholic Beverage Control
- New Jersey wine
