= New Jersey Division of Alcoholic Beverage Control =

US state government agency

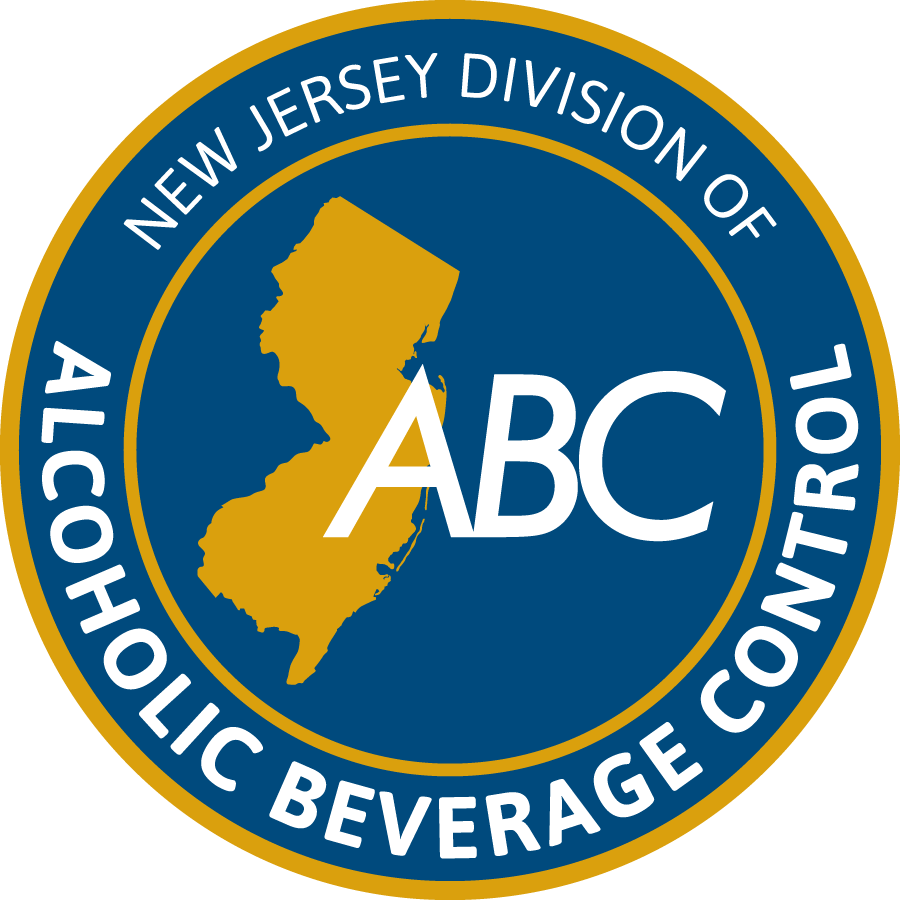
- Seal of the NJABC

Division overview
- Formed: December 6, 1933; 92 years ago (as Department of Alcoholic Beverage Control)
- Jurisdiction: Government of New Jersey
- Headquarters: 140 East Front Street Trenton, New Jersey
- Division executives: Paul T. Urbish, Acting Director; Missy Urban, Deputy Director
- Parent department: Department of Law and Public Safety
- Website: http://www.nj.gov/oag/abc/offices.htm

The New Jersey Division of Alcoholic Beverage Control (ABC) is an agency of the government of the state of New Jersey that regulates commerce in alcoholic beverages in that state.

The 21st Amendment to the United States Constitution, which ended the Prohibition, permitted the states to regulate matters related to alcohol. Immediately upon the end of Prohibition in 1933, New Jersey instituted the Alcoholic Beverage Control Law, codified as "Title 33 Intoxicating Liquors" of the New Jersey Statutes, which established the state ABC. These laws are expanded through administrative regulations in Title 13, Chapter 2 of the New Jersey Administrative Code. After New Jersey's 1947 Constitution was adopted and some departments were consolidated, the department was incorporated into the Division of Law and Public Safety under the New Jersey Attorney General's office.

The ABC is headed by a Director, who is appointed by the Governor of New Jersey with the advice and consent of the State Senate. Investigations of violations of the ABC law are conducted by the Alcoholic Beverage Control Enforcement Unit in the Division of State Police which, like the Division of Alcoholic Beverage Control, is within the New Jersey Department of Law and Public Safety under the state attorney general.

In June 2017, State Assemblyman Dave Rible was nominated by Governor Chris Christie to head the department. Rible was confirmed to the position of Director by the State Senate and appointed the following month.

== Related legislation ==
- 1933: An act concerning alcoholic beverages, P.L. 1933, c. 436
- 1948: Department of Law and Public Safety Act of 1948, P.L. 1948, c. 439

== See also ==
- Alcohol laws of New Jersey
- Alcohol laws of the United States
- Beer in New Jersey
- List of wineries, breweries, and distilleries in New Jersey
- New Jersey distilled spirits
- New Jersey Farm Winery Act
- New Jersey wine
- New Jersey Wine Industry Advisory Council
