= Balic Winery =

Winery in Atlantic County, New Jersey

Coordinates: 39.463632°N 74.788141°W

- Location: 6623 Harding Highway (Route 40), Mays Landing, New Jersey, USA
- Coordinates: 39.463632 N, 74.788141 W
- Appellation: Outer Coastal Plain AVA
- First vines planted: Early 19th century
- Opened to the public: 1966
- Key people: Savo Balić (founder); Bojan Boskovic (owner)
- Area cultivated: 57
- Cases/yr: Undisclosed
- Known for: Pomegranate wine
- Distribution: On-site, wine festivals, NJ farmers' markets, NJ outlet stores, NJ restaurants, home shipment
- Tasting: Daily tastings
- Website: http://www.balicwinery.com/

Balic Winery is a winery in the Mays Landing section of Hamilton Township in Atlantic County, New Jersey. The vineyard was first planted in the early 19th century by descendants of the original settlers of Mays Landing. Balic is the third-oldest active winery in the state, after Renault Winery and Tomasello Winery, having opened in 1966. Balic is one of the largest winegrowers in New Jersey, having 57 acres of grapes under cultivation. The winery is named after its founder.

== Wines ==
Balic Winery is in the Outer Coastal Plain AVA, and produces wine from Cabernet Franc, Cabernet Sauvignon, Chambourcin, Chardonnay, Chenin blanc, Pinot noir, Riesling, Sangiovese, Vidal blanc, Viognier, Vranac, and Zinfandel grapes. Balic also makes fruit wines from almonds, blackberries, blueberries, cherries, cranberries, mangoes, pomegranates, raspberries, and strawberries. It is the only winery in New Jersey that produces wine from Vranac, which is a red vinifera grape indigenous to Montenegro. Balic is best known for its signature pomegranate wine, and they advertise the medical benefits from antioxidants in pomegranate wine.

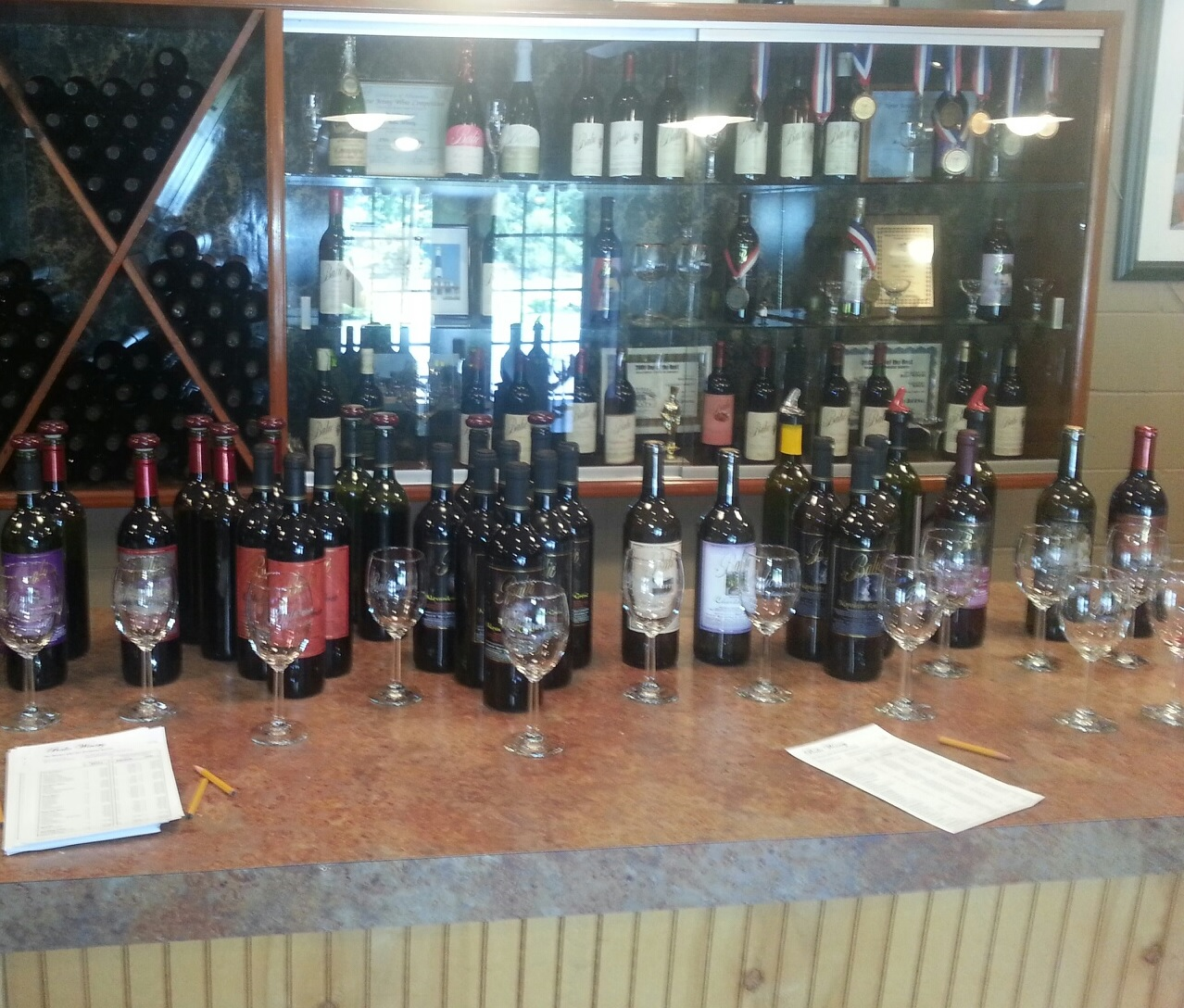
Balic Winery sells over 25 different types of wine.

== Licensing, associations, and outlets ==
Balic has a plenary winery license from the New Jersey Division of Alcoholic Beverage Control, which allows it to produce an unrestricted amount of wine, operate up to 15 off-premises sales rooms, and ship up to 12 cases per year to consumers in-state or out-of-state. Balic is not a member of the Garden State Wine Growers Association or the Outer Coastal Plain Vineyard Association. The winery operates outlet stores in five New Jersey towns – Clinton, Denville, Vernon, Vineland and Clark.

== See also ==
- Alcohol laws of New Jersey
- American wine
- Judgment of Princeton
- List of wineries, breweries, and distilleries in New Jersey
- New Jersey Farm Winery Act
- New Jersey Wine Industry Advisory Council
- New Jersey wine
