= Outer Coastal Plain AVA =

American Viticultural Area in New Jersey

Coordinates: 39°39′28″N 74°51′14″W

Outer Coastal Plain
- Wine region
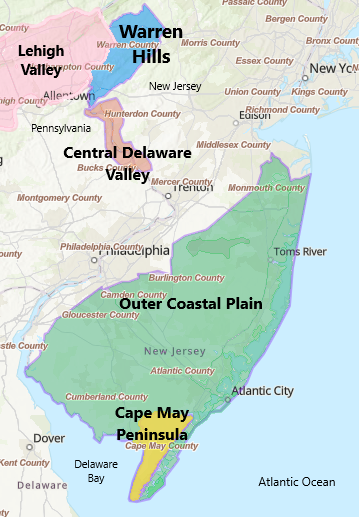
- Type: American Viticultural Area
- Year established: 2007; 2017 Amend
- Country: United States
- Part of: New Jersey
- Other regions in New Jersey: Central Delaware Valley AVA, Warren Hills AVA
- Sub-regions: Cape May Peninsula AVA
- Growing season: 188–217 days
- Climate region: Region III-IV
- Heat units: 3,001–4,000 GDDs
- Precipitation (annual average): 40 in (1,000 mm)
- Soil conditions: Well drained sandy loam that derived from unconsolidated sediments
- Total area: 2,255,400 acres (3,524 sq mi); 2017: +32,932 acres (51 sq mi)
- Size of planted vineyards: 750 acres (300 ha)
- Grapes produced: Albarino, Cabernet Franc, Cabernet Sauvignon, Cayuga. Chambourcin, Chardonnay, Fredonia, Ives Noir, Lemberger, Malbec, Merlot, Muscat Ottonel, Niagara, Petit Verdot, Pinot Gris/Grigio, Riesling, Rkatsiteli, Sangiovese, Seyval Blanc, Syrah/Shiraz, Tinta Cao, Touriga Nacional, Traminette, Trebbiano, Vidal Blanc, Vignoles/Ravat, Viognier
- No. of wineries: 33

Outer Coastal Plain is an American Viticultural Area (AVA) located in southernmost New Jersey. It was established as the nation's 186^{th} and the state's third wine appellation on February 9, 2007 by the Alcohol and Tobacco Tax and Trade Bureau (TTB), Treasury after reviewing the petition submitted by James Quarella of Bellview Winery, Frank Selak of Sylvin Winery, Larry Coia of Coia Vineyard and Dante Romanini of Panther Branch Vineyard on behalf of themselves and local vintners proposing a viticultural area in southeastern New Jersey known as "Outer Coastal Plain."

The 2.25-million-acre (3,516 sq mi) appellation is roughly triangle-shaped and comprises the eastern and southernmost New Jersey regions. Outer Coastal Plain is one of five defined physiographic regions of New Jersey. The other regions are the Inner Coastal Plain, the Newark Basin Piedmont, the Highlands, and the Appalachian Valley and Ridge. Outer Coastal Plain includes the Atlantic coastline and the area known as the "Pinelands" or "Pine Barrens." It encompasses all of Cumberland, Cape May, Atlantic, and Ocean Counties and portions of Salem, Gloucester, Camden, Burlington, and Monmouth Counties. The region is characterized by well-drained sandy or sandy loam soils of low to moderate fertility, and a relatively long growing season. The climate is moderated by the influence of the Atlantic Ocean and Delaware Bay. The plant hardiness zones range from 7a to 8a.
In 2017, Outer Coastal Plain was expanded approximately 32,932 acres (51 sq mi) to include all or portions of Atlantic, Burlington, Camden, Cape May, Cumberland, Gloucester, Monmouth, Ocean and Salem counties after the TTB reviewed the petition from John and Jane Giunco, owners of 4JG's Orchards and Vineyards in Colts Neck, New Jersey. The viticultural area and the expansion does not lie within another viticultural area.
The 126,635-acre (198 sq mi) Cape May Peninsula viticultural area was established by the TTB in 2018 as a sub-appellation within the southernmost tip of Outer Coast Plain where its petition specified that the new AVA, bordered entirely by water and the New Jersey Pinelands, has its own unique terroir.

== Terroir ==
=== Soils and Geology ===
The petitioner asserts that the soils and geology of the Outer Coast Plain viticultural area clearly distinguish it from surrounding areas. Despite its large landmass, the Outer Coastal Plain has remarkably uniform, well drained sandy soils that derived from unconsolidated sediments. The relatively low fertility and low pH of these soils, the petitioner notes, are favorable for grape growing. In contrast to the soils of the Outer Coastal Plain, the fine, silty soils of the Inner Coastal Plain to the west have both higher fertility and higher pH and the soils to the north are dense and rocky, and are derived from bedrock. As evidence of the viticultural area's distinctive geology, the petitioner submitted the "Geologic Map of New Jersey." Published by the State's Department of Environmental Protection, this map clearly shows that most of the Outer Coastal Plain is underlain by unconsolidated deposits of sand, silt, and clay of the Tertiary period and that a small coastal fringe consists of beach and estuarine deposits of the Holocene epoch. The parent material of soils in other parts of the State formed in later geologic periods. The Inner Coastal Plain, in contrast, is underlain by sand, silt, and clay of the Cretaceous period, and the northern regions of the State are underlain by sedimentary, igneous, and metamorphic rocks of still later geologic periods. According to the petitioner, a unique feature of the viticultural area is its significant aquifers, particularly the Cohansey aquifer, the largest freshwater aquifer in the mid-Atlantic region. The petitioner states that this aquifer is so important to the region's drainage and water supply that it was one reason the Pinelands National Reserve was created as a federally protected area. The Cohansey aquifer is part of the 1.93 million acres (3,016 sq mi) Kirkwood-Cohansey aquifer system, the borders of which nearly correspond to those of the viticultural area. The Cohansey and other aquifers, the petitioner notes, provide an abundant source of water for the viticultural area's vineyards. In contrast to the Outer Coastal Plain, the adjacent Inner Coastal Plain has smaller, confined aquifers, mostly in the Potomac-Raritan-Magothy aquifer system.

=== Elevation ===
The petitioner states that the viticultural area's elevation is another feature that distinguishes it from adjacent areas. According to an elevation map issued by the New Jersey Geological Survey, almost the entire area has elevations of less than 280 feet (85 m) above sea level, and most of the area has elevations significantly below that height. The petitioner notes that the viticultural area's low elevation and proximity to the Atlantic Ocean are moderating influences on its climate. Elevations in the other regions of New Jersey are higher. Elevations in the northwestern part of the State, for example, range from 1,300 to 1,680 feet (400–510 m).

=== Climate ===
According to the petitioner, the climate of the Outer Coastal Plain is strongly influenced by the Atlantic Ocean to the east and Delaware Bay to the south. Because of this maritime influence on its climate, the viticultural area is generally warmer, has a longer growing season, and has more moderate temperatures than areas to the west and north. As evidence of the maritime influence, the petitioner submitted a USDA plant hardiness zone map of New Jersey and noted that the viticultural area is in zones 7a, 7b, or 8a, whereas areas to the north and west are in cooler zones and have shorter growing seasons. The petitioner also submitted a climate overview published on the New Jersey State Climatologist site. The overview shows that the viticultural area has between 190 and 217 freeze-free days per year. In contrast, the Highlands region to the north averages 163 freeze-free days and the central Piedmont region averages 179 freeze-free days. The petitioner notes that because of these climatic differences, more temperature-sensitive grape varieties may be grown in vineyards within the viticultural area than in vineyards in other adjacent regions.

== Wineries ==
As of 2025, there are 48 wineries in the Outer Coastal Plain AVA including the 9 wineries in the **Cape May Peninsula AVA. Most of the wineries in this AVA are also members of the Outer Coastal Plain Vineyard Association, an industry trade organization "dedicated to the establishment and promotion of sustainable and economically viable viticulture in the Outer Coastal Plain AVA of New Jersey."

- Amalthea Cellars in Atco
- Auburn Road Vineyards in Pilesgrove
- Autumn Lake Winery in Williamstown
- Balic Winery in Mays Landing
- Bellview Winery in Landisville
- Briganti By The Bay Vineyard and Winery in Cape May Court House**
- Cape May Winery & Vineyard in North Cape May**
- Cedar Rose Vineyards in Millville
- Chestnut Run Farm in Pilesgrove
- Coda Rossa Winery in Franklinville
- DeMastro Vineyards in Vincentown
- DiBella Winery in Woolwich
- DiMatteo Vineyards in Hammonton
- Four JG's Orchards & Vineyards in Colts Neck
- G&W Winery in Rio Grande**
- Hawk Haven Vineyard & Winery in Rio Grande**
- Jessie Creek Winery in Dias Creek**
- Laurita Winery in New Egypt
- Monroeville Vineyard & Winery in Monroeville
- Natali Vineyards in Goshen**
- Ocean City Winery in Marmora**
- Plagido's Winery in Hammonton
- Renault Winery in Egg Harbor City and Galloway
- Salem Oak Vineyards in Pedricktown
- Sharrott Winery in Blue Anchor
- Summit City Winery in Glassboro
- Sylvin Farms Winery in Germania
- Tomasello Winery in Hammonton
- Turdo Vineyards & Winery in North Cape May**
- Valenzano Winery in Shamong
- Villari Vineyards in Deptford
- Wagonhouse Winery in South Harrison
- White Horse Winery in Hammonton
- William Heritage Winery in Mullica Hill
- Willow Creek Winery in West Cape May**

== See also ==
- Alcohol laws of New Jersey
- Garden State Wine Growers Association
- Judgment of Princeton
- List of wineries, breweries, and distilleries in New Jersey
- New Jersey Farm Winery Act
- New Jersey Wine Industry Advisory Council
