= Cape May Peninsula AVA =

American Viticultural Area in New Jersey

Coordinates: 39°06′41″N 74°52′31″W

Cape May Peninsula
- Wine region
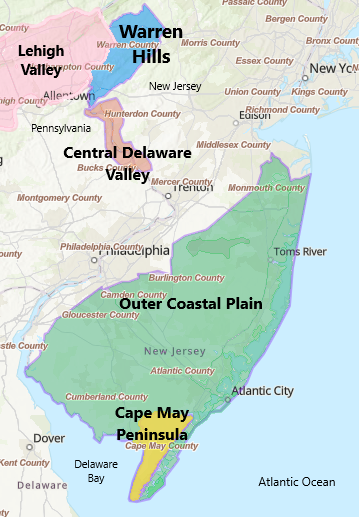
- Type: American Viticultural Area
- Year established: 2018
- Country: United States
- Part of: New Jersey, Outer Coastal Plain AVA
- Growing season: 179–207 days
- Climate region: Region III
- Heat units: 3,516 GDD units
- Precipitation (annual average): 33.8 to 38.5 in (860–980 mm)I
- Soil conditions: Downer, Evesboro, Sassafras, Fort Mott, Hooksan, Swainton, Aura sandy loam
- Total area: 126,635 acres (198 sq mi)
- Size of planted vineyards: 115 acres (47 ha)
- No. of vineyards: 6
- Grapes produced: Albariño, Dolcetto, Tempranillo, Nebbiolo, Merlot, Barbera, Moscato, Malvasia, Viognier
- No. of wineries: 7

Cape May Peninsula is an American Viticultural Area (AVA) located in the southernmost region of New Jersey. It was established as the nation's 241st and the state's fourth wine appellation on April 6, 2018 by the Alcohol and Tobacco Tax and Trade Bureau (TTB), Treasury after reviewing the petition submitted by Dr. Alfred Natali, owner of Natali Vineyards, LLC, on behalf of the ad hoc Cape May Wine Growers Association, proposing the viticultural area named "Cape May Peninsula." The 126,635 acres (198 sq mi) wine appellation includes most of Cape May and a small portion of Cumberland Counties. The region is characterized by well-drained sandy or sandy loam soils of low to moderate fertility, and a relatively long growing season. The climate is strongly moderated by the influence of the Atlantic Ocean and Delaware Bay. The region is in hardiness zones range from 7a to 8a. The appellation lies entirely within the pre-established Outer Coastal Plain AVA, yet has a unique terroir with a more moderate temperature and a longer growing season. The distinguishing features of the Cape May Peninsula AVA are its temperature and soils.

== History ==
Although the viticultural history of Cape May is recent, the historical origins of the name go back to the early colonial period. Henry Hudson, sponsored by the famous Dutch East India Company, discovered the area between Newfoundland and the Chesapeake Bay in 1609 in search of a water route from Western Europe to the Far East. He spent more time exploring the Hudson River rather than the Delaware because of the deeper water and more protected approach to the natural harbor at present day New York; however, he did lay claim to the entire area on behalf of Holland. Following Hudson's voyages of discovery, the Dutch colony of New Netherlands was founded in what is today lower Manhattan. From 1614 to 1616 Dutch explorer Captain Cornelius May explored Delaware Bay and its surrounding areas including the Cape. In 1620 he was authorized by the Dutch Parliament (or States General) to explore the area between the 38th and 40th parallels which includes the Delaware Bay. Sailing in the ship Blidje Boodschap (Joyful Message) he arrived at and surveyed the bay. He built Fort Nassau next to what is present day Gloucester City and traded with the indigenous Kechemeches. The first settlement in Cape May County was the whaling community of Town Bank, just north of Cape May Point, established in 1650. Although there were a number of Dutch explorers who sailed in these waters, Captain May confirmed his legacy by naming the Cape after himself.

There was little activity in Cape May during the 18th Century; however, the introduction of steam powered boats in the early 19th Century provided a fillip to the development of Cape May as a summer destination for wealthy Philadelphia merchants. Large hotels, horse racing on the beach, and gambling casinos attracted visitors seeking relief from the stifling heat and humidity of the city. Several US presidents vacationed there. After a great fire destroyed the city in 1878, Cape May was rebuilt in the Victorian architectural style for which it is known today. Thus the AVA is connected to a name with roots deep in the early American colonial history. It has evolved over the last 200 years as a summer resort destination, and more recently has developed a vibrant wine industry. The Outer Coastal Plain AVA name, by way of contrast, is a geological formation consisting of a low lying sandy plain of which the Cape May Peninsula forms a portion.

== Terroir ==
=== Climate ===
According to the petition, temperature is the most important distinguishing feature of the Cape May Peninsula AVA. The petitioner compared temperature data from Cape May County Airport, Woodbine Airport, and a U.S. Department of Agriculture site in Swainton, New Jersey, all within the AVA with temperature data from Millville Airport, the southernmost weather station in the Outer Coastal Plain AVA outside the AVA. The petition included information on growing degree days (GDD) from both inside and outside the AVA. GDDs are important to viticulture because they represent how often daily temperatures rise above 50 °F, which is the minimum temperature required for active vine growth and fruit development. Inside the AVA, Cape May Airport and Swainton have averages of 3,491 GDDs and 3,331 GDDs, respectively, making the AVA a Winkler Region III, which is defined as between 3,001 and 3,500 GDDs. Millville Airport, outside of the AVA, has an average of 3,516 GDDs per year, making that area a warmer Winkler Region IV, which is defined as between 3,501 and 4,000 GDDs. However, the petition states that comparing only the average number of GDDs within and outside the AVA can be misleading when it comes to determining the length of the growing season and the types of grapes that can grow inside and outside the AVA. For example, the petition notes significant temperature differences in terms of extreme temperatures. The average summertime high temperature at Cape May Airport is 94 °F (34 °C), while the average summertime high temperature at Millville Airport is 98 °F (37 °C). Average summertime high temperatures for Woodbine Airport and Swainton are not provided in the petition. The average wintertime low temperatures at Woodbine Airport, Swainton, and Cape May Airport are 7 °F (−14 °C), 9 °F (−13 °C), and 12 °F (−11 °C), respectively. The average wintertime low temperature at Millville Airport is 3 °F (−16 °C). The killing range for all but the most cold-hardy Vitis vinifera vines is 5 to −5 °F (−15 to −21 °C). Another significant indicator of the climate difference between the Cape May Peninsula AVA and the existing Outer Coastal Plain AVA is the number of frost-free days. A comparison of weather data from Millville and Swainton shows that the average number of frost-free days at Millville is 179, while the average number of frost-free days at Swainton is 207.7. At Swainton, the last freeze usually occurs around April 15 and the first frost usually occurs around November 1. At Millville, the last freeze usually occurs in late April and the first frost usually occurs in mid-October. Due to the above differences in frost-free days and GDD totals, the Cape May Peninsula accumulates fewer GDDs over a longer growing season than the Outer Coastal Plain AVA accumulates in a shorter season. The combination of warmer wintertime temperatures and a longer growing season explains the AVA's ability to grow cold-tender Vitis vinifera (more than 90 percent of its plantings) in preference to the hybrids and native plants grown throughout the existing Outer Coastal Plain AVA.

=== Soils ===
The soils in the Cape May Peninsula AVA are mostly loamy sand, whereas the soils in the existing Outer Coastal Plain AVA are a sandy loam. According to the petition, soils best suited to viticulture are well-drained, where the water table is a minimum of six feet or deeper. These types of soils include Downer, Evesboro, Sassafras, Fort Mott, Hooksan, Swainton, and Aura. All of these soils are present in the AVA and in the Outer Coastal Plain AVA; however, the Outer Coastal Plain AVA contains additional soils not found in the proposed AVA, including Hammonton, Waterford, Galetown, and Metapeake. The soils in the 126,635-acre (198 sq mi) appellation are as follows:

- Hydric (unsuited to farming): 51,609 acres (20,885 ha);
- Arable (suited to berry-type farming): 48,454 acres (19,609 ha);
- Well-drained (suited to viticulture): 16,381 acres (6,629 ha);
- Municipal parks, airports, freshwater lakes, ponds, and tidal creeks: 10,191 acres (4,124 ha)

The Cape May County Planning Department has identified the areas with the most well-drained soils as prospective sites for viticulture. The New Jersey Pinelands to the north and west of the AVA is an area of dense pine forest with acidic soils that are unsuitable for most farming, including viticulture. The Pinelands cover 22 percent of the state and nearly half of the existing Outer Coastal Plain AVA. The Pinelands consist of pygmy pines, swamp cedars, insect-eating plants, orchids, unique species of reptiles, endangered birds, self-contained springs, lakes, streams and bogs, and a sandy, extremely acidic and nutrient-poor surface soil. The only serious commercial crops in the Pinelands are acid-loving cranberries and blueberries. The petition states that during colonial times, people attempted to farm this land but failed due to the infertility of the soil and the low pH (the mean pH for the Pinelands is 4.4; grape vines require a pH in the 6 to 7 range). In order to improve the quality of the soils in the Pinelands, one would have to apply and incorporate large amounts of lime over a long period of time.

== Wineries ==
As of 2025, there are 9 wineries in the Cape May Peninsula AVA. Most of the wineries are also members of the Outer Coastal Plain Vineyard Association, an industry trade organization "dedicated to the establishment and promotion of sustainable and economically viable viticulture in the Outer Coastal Plain."

- Natali Vineyards in Cape May Court House
- Cape May Winery & Vineyard in North Cape May
- G&W Winery in Rio Grande
- Hawk Haven Vineyard & Winery in Rio Grande
- Jessie Creek Winery in Dias Creek
- Natali Vineyards in Goshen
- Ocean City Winery in Marmora
- Turdo Vineyards & Winery in North Cape May
- Willow Creek Winery in West Cape May

== See also ==
- Alcohol laws of New Jersey
- Garden State Wine Growers Association
- Judgment of Princeton
- List of wineries, breweries, and distilleries in New Jersey
- New Jersey Farm Winery Act
- New Jersey Wine Industry Advisory Council
