= Valenzano Winery =

American winery located in New Jersey

- Location: 1090 Route 206, Shamong, New Jersey, United States
- Coordinates: 39.7913°N 74.7368°W
- Appellation: Outer Coastal Plain AVA
- Other labels: Jersey Devil Meadery
- First vines planted: 1991
- First vintage: 1995
- Opened to the public: 1996
- Key people: Anthony B. Valenzano (owner)
- Area cultivated: 88
- Cases/yr: 80,000 (2018)
- Other attractions: Picnicking permitted, pet-friendly, (outside), sustainable farming and green energy compliant
- Distribution: On-site, wine festivals, NJ farmers' markets, NJ liquor stores, NJ restaurants, home shipment
- Tasting: Daily tastings, tours by appointment
- Website: valenzanowine.com

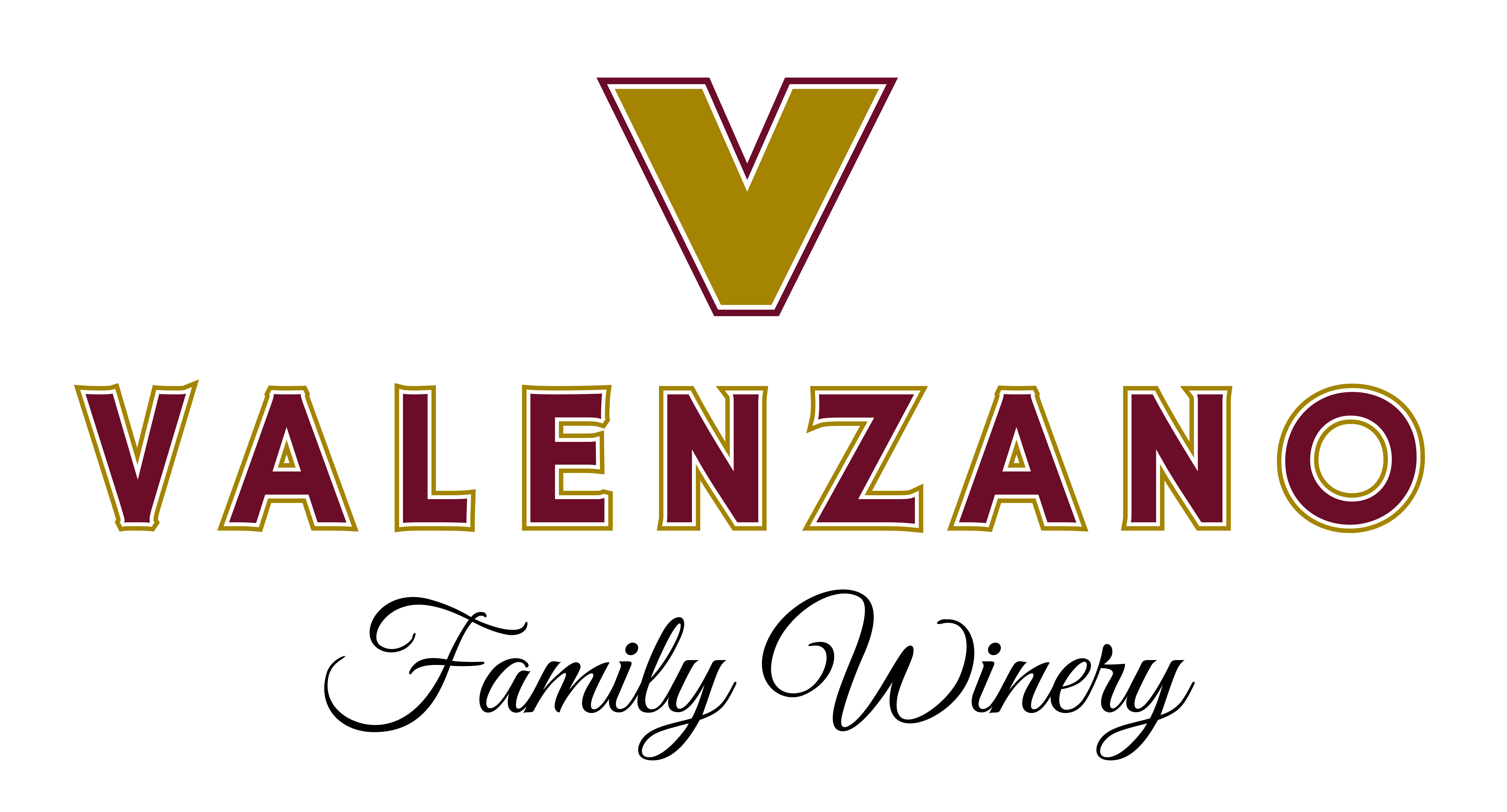
Valenzano Winery

Valenzano Winery is a winery in Shamong in Burlington County, New Jersey, United States. A family grain and livestock farm since 1974, the vineyard was first planted in 1991, and opened to the public in 1996. Valenzano is one of the largest wine producers in New Jersey, having 88 acres of grapes under cultivation, and producing 80,000 cases of wine per year. The winery is named after the family that owns it.

== Wines ==
Valenzano Winery is located in the Outer Coastal Plain AVA, and produces wine from Cabernet Franc, Cabernet Sauvignon, Chambourcin, Chardonnay, Concord, Fredonia, Ives noir, Merlot, Niagara, Cynthiana, Vidal blanc, and Zinfandel grapes. Valenzano also makes fruit wines from apples, blueberries, cranberries, peaches, plums, raspberries, and mead from locally-produced honey.

== Events, licensing, and associations ==
Since 2002, the vineyard has hosted "WineFest," a wine festival that over 9,000 people typically attend. Valenzano has a plenary winery license from the New Jersey Division of Alcoholic Beverage Control, which allows it to produce an unrestricted amount of wine, operate up to 15 off-premises sales rooms, and ship up to 12 cases per year to consumers in-state or out-of-state. The winery is a member of the Garden State Wine Growers Association and the Outer Coastal Plain Vineyard Association.

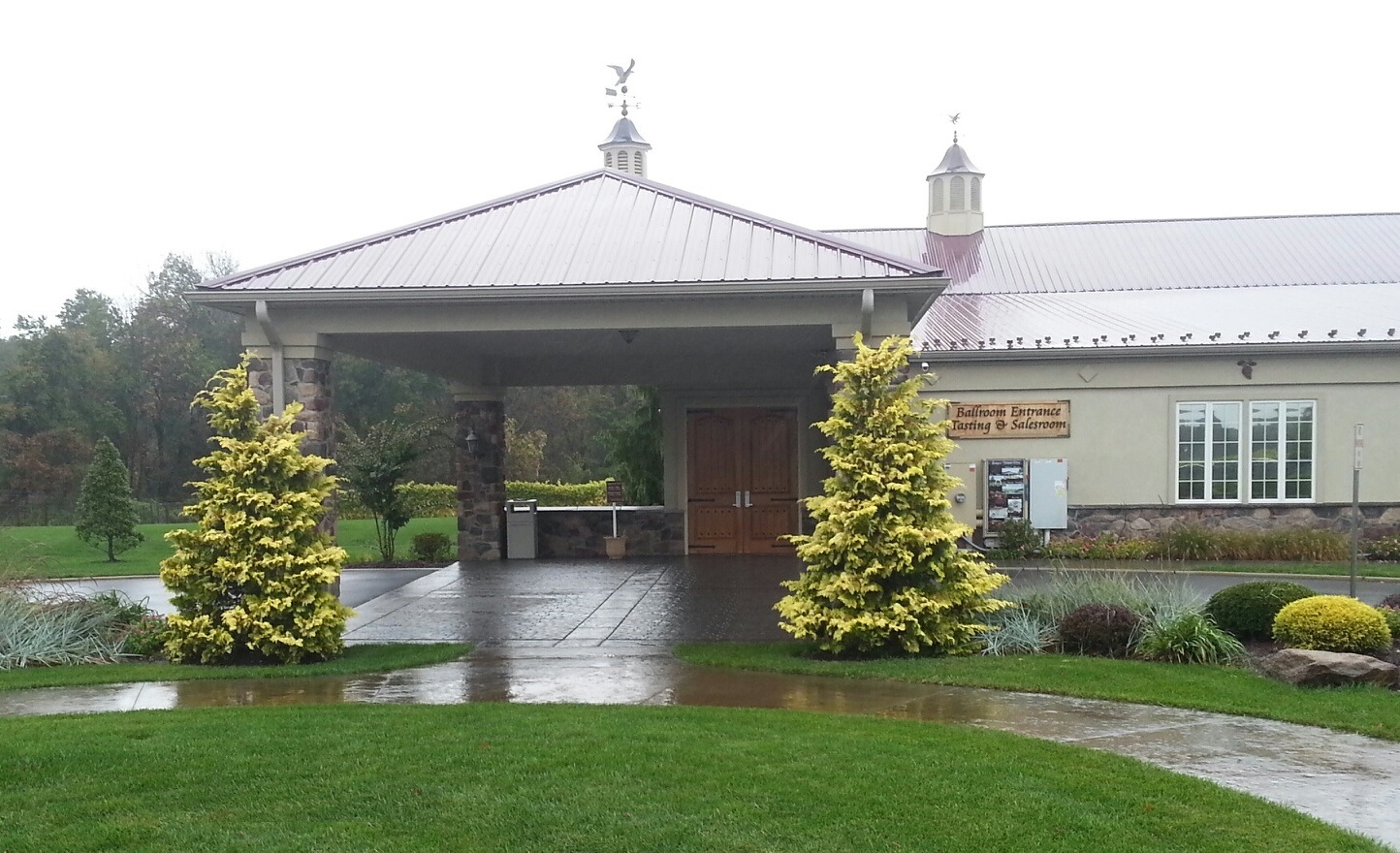
Many weddings and catered events are held at Valenzano Winery

== Features and controversy ==
The entire winery facility is powered using solar energy, and heated using geothermal energy. Valenzano is located in the New Jersey Pine Barrens, and has had conflicts with state authorities regarding the construction of a banquet hall and the installation of solar panels on agricultural land. Before the winery was permitted to build its banquet facility, the New Jersey Pinelands Commission required that it conduct environmental and archaeological studies which took three years and $250,000 to complete. In 2011, Valenzano questioned whether the Pinelands Commission had the authority to regulate solar panels. Valenzano Winery has won awards for their wines including 2 double-gold medals from the Finger Lakes Wine Competition and the Indie International Wine Competition.

== See also ==
- Alcohol laws of New Jersey
- American wine
- Judgment of Princeton
- List of wineries, breweries, and distilleries in New Jersey
- New Jersey Farm Winery Act
- New Jersey Wine Industry Advisory Council
- New Jersey wine
