= DiMatteo Vineyards =

American winery located in New Jersey

Coordinates: 39.593872°N 74.801525°W

- Location: 951 8th Street, Hammonton, New Jersey, USA
- Coordinates: 39.593872 N, 74.801525 W
- Appellation: Outer Coastal Plain AVA
- First vines planted: 2000
- Opened to the public: 2002
- Key people: Frank DiMatteo Jr., Frank DiMatteo III (owners)
- Area cultivated: 14
- Cases/yr: 1,500 (2011)
- Distribution: On-site, wine festivals, NJ liquor stores, NJ restaurants, home shipment
- Tasting: Tastings Thursday to Tuesday
- Website: https://www.dimatteofamilyvineyards.com/

DiMatteo Vineyards is a winery located in Hammonton in Atlantic County, New Jersey. Formerly a family produce farm, the vineyard was first planted in 2000, and opened to the public in 2002. In 2010, the winery moved its headquarters to a new location in Hammonton. DiMatteo has 14 acres of grapes under cultivation, and produces 1,500 cases of wine per year. The winery is named after the family that owns it.

== Wines ==
DiMatteo Vineyards is in the Outer Coastal Plain AVA, and produces wine from Cabernet Franc, Cayuga White, Chambourcin, Chancellor, Chardonnay, Concord, Diamond, Ives noir, Merlot, Niagara, Syrah, Traminette, and Vidal blanc grapes. DiMatteo also makes fruit wines from apples, blueberries, cranberries, peaches, pumpkins, and strawberries. It is the only winery in New Jersey that produces wine from Diamond, which is a white hybrid grape developed in New York in the 1880s.

== Licensing and associations ==
DiMatteo has a farm winery license from the New Jersey Division of Alcoholic Beverage Control, which allows it to produce up to 50,000 gallons of wine per year, operate up to 15 off-premises sales rooms, and ship up to 12 cases per year to consumers in-state or out-of-state. The winery is a member of the Garden State Wine Growers Association and the Outer Coastal Plain Vineyard Association.

== See also ==
- Alcohol laws of New Jersey
- American wine
- Judgment of Princeton
- List of wineries, breweries, and distilleries in New Jersey
- New Jersey Farm Winery Act
- New Jersey Wine Industry Advisory Council
- New Jersey wine
