= DeMastro Vineyards =

Winery in New Jersey, U.S.

- Location: 436 Ongs Hat Road, Vincentown, NJ, US
- Coordinates: 39.9332°N 74.6938°W
- Appellation: Outer Coastal Plain AVA
- Key people: Mary DeSantis, Angelo Mastropieri (owners)
- Acres cultivated: 31
- Cases/yr: 7,000 (2013)
- Distribution: On-site, NJ restaurants, home shipment
- Tasting: Tastings on Saturday and by appointment on Sunday
- Website: demastrovineyards.com

DeMastro Vineyards is a winery in the Vincentown section of Southampton in Burlington County, New Jersey. DeMastro has 31 acres of grapes under cultivation, and produces 7,000 cases of wine per year. The winery was incorporated in 1990. The winery's name is an amalgamation of the owners' surnames.

== Wines ==
DeMastro Vineyards is in the Outer Coastal Plain AVA, and produces wine from Barbera, Cabernet Sauvignon, Chardonnay, Merlot, Pinot noir, and Riesling grapes.

== Licensing, associations, and distribution ==
DeMastro has a farm winery license from the New Jersey Division of Alcoholic Beverage Control, which allows it to produce up to 50,000 gallons of wine per year, operate up to 15 off-premises sales rooms, and ship up to 12 cases per year to consumers in-state or out-of-state. The winery is not a member of the Garden State Wine Growers Association or the Outer Coastal Plain Vineyard Association. DeMastro sells their wines on-site, at local restaurants, and though online sales.

== See also ==
- Alcohol laws of New Jersey
- American wine
- Judgment of Princeton
- List of wineries, breweries, and distilleries in New Jersey
- New Jersey Farm Winery Act
- New Jersey Wine Industry Advisory Council
- New Jersey wine
