= Laurita Winery =

American winery located in New Jersey

Coordinates: 40.066632°N 74.503652°W

- Location: 85 Archertown Road, New Egypt, New Jersey, USA
- Coordinates: 40.066632 N, 74.503652 W
- Appellation: Outer Coastal Plain AVA
- First vines planted: 1998
- Opened to the public: 2008
- Key people: Randy Johnson, (owner); Armondo (winemaker)
- Acres cultivated: 44
- Cases/yr: 14,000 (2011)
- Other attractions: Bed and breakfast, bistro, horseback riding, therapeutic riding
- Distribution: On-site, wine festivals, home shipment
- Tasting: Tastings Wednesday to Sunday
- Website: http://www.lauritawinery.com/

Laurita Winery is a winery in the New Egypt section of Plumsted Township in Ocean County, New Jersey. Formerly a dairy farm, the vineyard was first planted in 1998, and opened to the public in 2008. Laurita is one of the larger winegrowers in New Jersey, having 44 acres of grapes under cultivation, and producing 14,000 cases of wine per year. The winery’s name is an amalgamation of the names of the owners' mothers, Laura and Rita.

== Wines ==
Laurita Winery is located in the Outer Coastal Plain AVA, and produces wine from Albariño, Blaufränkisch (Lemberger), Cabernet Franc, Cabernet Sauvignon, Chambourcin, Chardonnay, Grenache, Merlot, Norton (Cynthiana), Pinot gris, and Zweigelt grapes. Laurita also makes a fruit wine from strawberries and milk, and a dessert wine using milk, chocolate, and Chambourcin grapes. It is the only winery in New Jersey that produces dairy-based wines.

== Features, licensing, and associations ==
Since 2002, Laurita has operated a 10-suite bed and breakfast in an 1835 farmhouse. The winery also has a bistro that sells cheeses, salads, and sandwiches, and an equestrian center that offers horseback riding and therapeutic riding. Laurita has a plenary winery license from the New Jersey Division of Alcoholic Beverage Control, which allows it to produce an unrestricted amount of wine, operate up to 15 off-premises sales rooms, and ship up to 12 cases per year to consumers in-state or out-of-state. The winery is a member of the Garden State Wine Growers Association and the Outer Coastal Plain Vineyard Association.

== Controversy, advocacy, and publicity ==
Laurita has had conflicts with state authorities regarding the installation of solar panels, and the hosting of weddings at the winery. In 2012, the New Jersey Agriculture Development Committee stated that because the winery is on preserved farmland, it could not install solar panels or hold non-agricultural events. The winery has advocated changing state law to allow more events to be held by preserved farms. In March 2011, travel guide Burt Wolf visited Laurita as part of a New Jersey Network (NJN) fundraiser.

== See also ==
- Alcohol laws of New Jersey
- American wine
- Judgment of Princeton
- List of wineries, breweries, and distilleries in New Jersey
- New Jersey Farm Winery Act
- New Jersey Wine Industry Advisory Council
- New Jersey wine
