= Plagido's Winery =

American winery located in New Jersey

Coordinates: 39.635105°N 74.823229°W

- Location: 570 North 1st Road, Hammonton, New Jersey, USA
- Coordinates: 39.635105 N, 74.823229 W
- Appellation: Outer Coastal Plain AVA
- First vines planted: 1999
- Opened to the public: 2007
- Key people: Ollie Tomasello Sr. (founder); Ollie Tomasello Jr. (owner)
- Area cultivated: 14
- Cases/yr: 4,200 (2013)
- Distribution: On-site, wine festivals, NJ liquor stores, NJ restaurants, home shipment
- Tasting: Daily tastings
- Website: http://www.plagidoswinery.com/

Plagido's Winery is a winery located in Hammonton in Atlantic County, New Jersey. A family produce farm since the late 19th century, the vineyard was first planted in 1999, and opened to the public in 2007. The winery was originally known as "Placido's Winery," but the name was changed in 2008 because of winery with a similar name exists in Tuscany. Plagido has 14 acres of grapes under cultivation, and produces 4,200 cases of wine per year. The winery is named after the owner's great-grandfather, who emigrated from Italy in the late 19th century, and started a farm in Hammonton.

== Wines ==
Plagido's Winery is in the Outer Coastal Plain AVA, and produces wine from Cabernet Franc, Cabernet Sauvignon, Chambourcin, Chardonnay, Concord, Fredonia, Marquis, Merlot, Niagara, and Syrah grapes. Plagido also makes fruit wines from apples, blackberries, blueberries, and cranberries. It is the only winery in New Jersey that produces wine from Marquis, a white hybrid grape developed in New York in 1968.

== Advocacy, licensing, and associations ==
Plagido is an advocate of the direct shipping of wine from wineries to customers. Plagido has a farm winery license from the New Jersey Division of Alcoholic Beverage Control, which allows it to produce up to 50,000 gallons of wine per year, operate up to 15 off-premises sales rooms, and ship up to 12 cases per year to consumers in-state or out-of-state. The winery is a member of the Garden State Wine Growers Association and the Outer Coastal Plain Vineyard Association.

== See also ==
- Alcohol laws of New Jersey
- American wine
- Judgment of Princeton
- List of wineries, breweries, and distilleries in New Jersey
- New Jersey Farm Winery Act
- New Jersey Wine Industry Advisory Council
- New Jersey wine
