= Wagonhouse Winery =

American winery located in New Jersey

Coordinates: 39.690330°N 75.285837°W

- Location: 1401 Route 45, Swedesboro, NJ, USA
- Coordinates: 39.690330 N, 75.285837 W
- Appellation: Outer Coastal Plain AVA
- Other labels: Three Boys Brand
- First vines planted: 2004
- Opened to the public: 2005
- Key people: Dan & Heather Brown (owners)
- Area cultivated: 10
- Cases/yr: 7,000 (2013)
- Other attractions: Picnicking permitted
- Distribution: On-site, wine festivals, NJ farmers' markets, NJ liquor stores, NJ restaurants, home shipment
- Tasting: Tastings Thursday to Sunday
- Website: http://www.wagonhousewinery.com/

Wagonhouse Winery is a winery in South Harrison Township (mailing address is Swedesboro) in Gloucester County, New Jersey. Wagonhouse's original vineyard was first planted in 2004 in Mickleton, also in Gloucester County. The winery began sales of its wine in 2005, and opened a tasting room in South Harrison in 2011. Wagonhouse has 10 acres of grapes under cultivation, and produces 7,000 cases of wine per year. The winery is named for an old wagon house that is on their farm.

== Wines ==
Wagonhouse Winery is located in the Outer Coastal Plain AVA, and produces wine from Cabernet Franc, Cabernet Sauvignon, Chardonnay, Merlot, Pinotage, Pinot gris, Sangiovese, Sauvignon blanc, Syrah, Vidal blanc, and Viognier grapes. Wagonhouse also makes fruit wines from almonds, apples, blueberries, cranberries, mangoes, peaches, pomegranates, and strawberries. The winery has a separate brand for their sweet wines, named "Three Boys Brand" after the owners' three sons. Wagonhouse is the only winery in New Jersey that produces wine from Pinotage, which is a red vinifera grape developed in South Africa in 1925.

== Licensing and associations ==
Wagonhouse has a plenary winery license from the New Jersey Division of Alcoholic Beverage Control, which allows it to produce an unrestricted amount of wine, operate up to 15 off-premises sales rooms, and ship up to 12 cases per year to consumers in-state or out-of-state. The winery is a member of the Garden State Wine Growers Association and the Outer Coastal Plain Vineyard Association.

== See also ==
- Alcohol laws of New Jersey
- American wine
- Judgment of Princeton
- List of wineries, breweries, and distilleries in New Jersey
- New Jersey Farm Winery Act
- New Jersey Wine Industry Advisory Council
- New Jersey wine
