= DiBella Winery =

American winery located in New Jersey

Coordinates: 39.728531°N 75.299573°W

- Location: 229 Davidson Road, Woolwich, NJ, USA
- Coordinates: 39.728531 N, 75.299573 W
- Appellation: Outer Coastal Plain AVA
- First vines planted: 2002
- Opened to the public: 2010
- Key people: Will & Julie DiBella, Alfred DiBella (owners)
- Area cultivated: 4
- Cases/yr: 250 (2011)
- Distribution: On-site, wine festivals, NJ liquor stores, home shipment
- Tasting: Tastings on weekends, Closed January to March
- Website: http://www.dibellawinery.com/

DiBella Winery is a winery in Woolwich Township in Gloucester County, New Jersey. A family produce and grain farm since 1925, the vineyard was first planted in 2002. DiBella began sales of its wine in 2010, and opened a tasting room in 2012. DiBella Winery has 4 acres of grapes under cultivation, and produces 250 cases of wine per year. The winery is named after the family that owns it.

== Wines ==
DiBella Winery is located in the Outer Coastal Plain AVA, and produces wine from Cabernet Franc, Cabernet Sauvignon, Chardonnay, Merlot, Pinot gris, and Traminette grapes. DiBella also makes fruit wines from cherries and raspberries.

== Licensing and associations ==
DiBella has a farm winery license from the New Jersey Division of Alcoholic Beverage Control, which allows it to produce up to 50,000 US gallons (190,000 L) of wine per year, operate up to 15 off-premises sales rooms, and ship up to 12 cases per year to consumers in-state or out-of-state. The winery is a member of the Garden State Wine Growers Association, but is not a member of the Outer Coastal Plain Vineyard Association.

== See also ==
- Alcohol laws of New Jersey
- American wine
- Judgment of Princeton
- List of wineries, breweries, and distilleries in New Jersey
- New Jersey Farm Winery Act
- New Jersey Wine Industry Advisory Council
- New Jersey wine
