= Chestnut Run Farm =

American winery located in New Jersey

Coordinates: 39.653891°N 75.291987°W

- Location: 66 Stewart Road, Pilesgrove, New Jersey, USA
- Coordinates: 39.653891 N, 75.291987 W
- Appellation: Outer Coastal Plain AVA
- First vines planted: 1986 (trees planted)
- Opened to the public: 2007
- Key people: Bob & Lise Clark (owners)
- Acres cultivated: 5
- Cases/yr: 700 (2011)
- Distribution: On-site, wine festivals, NJ liquor stores, home shipment
- Tasting: Tastings by appointment
- Website: http://www.chestnutrunfarms.com/

Chestnut Run Farm is a winery in Pilesgrove Township in Salem County, New Jersey that produces Fuji apple and Asian pear wines. The apple and pear trees were first planted in 1986 as part of a specialty produce farm. Chestnut Run began sales of its wine in 2007, and opened a tasting room in 2012. Chestnut Run has 5 acres of fruit trees under cultivation, and produces 700 cases of wine per year. The winery is named for the Chestnut Run, a stream that borders the farm.

== Wines ==
Chestnut Run Farm is in the Outer Coastal Plain AVA, and produces wine from Fuji apples and eight types of Asian pears, including Hosui, Yoinashi, and Shinko. It is the only winery in New Jersey that produces wine from Asian pears, which are a fruit indigenous to China, Japan, and Korea.

== Licensing and associations ==
Chestnut Run has a farm winery license from the New Jersey Division of Alcoholic Beverage Control, which allows it to produce up to 50,000 gallons of wine per year, operate up to 15 off-premises sales rooms, and ship up to 12 cases per year to consumers in-state or out-of-state. The winery is a member of the Garden State Wine Growers Association and the Outer Coastal Plain Vineyard Association.

== See also ==
- Alcohol laws of New Jersey
- American wine
- Judgment of Princeton
- List of wineries, breweries, and distilleries in New Jersey
- New Jersey Farm Winery Act
- New Jersey Wine Industry Advisory Council
- New Jersey wine
