= Sharrott Winery =

American winery located in New Jersey

Coordinates: 39.677047°N 74.873251°W

- Location: 370 South Egg Harbor Road, Blue Anchor, NJ, USA
- Coordinates: 39.677047 N, 74.873251 W
- Appellation: Outer Coastal Plain AVA
- First vines planted: 2005
- First vintage: 2007
- Opened to the public: 2008
- Key people: Larry Sharott Jr., Larry Sharrott III (owners)
- Area cultivated: 20 (2022)
- Cases/yr: 12,000 (2022)
- Known for: Wicked
- Varietals: Chardonnay, Merlot, Chambourcin, Cabernet Sauvignon, Cabernet Franc, Vidal Blanc, Sauvignon Blanc, Vignoles, Riesling, Rose, Brut, Fume Blanc, Crimson Sky, Sangria, Wicked (port style)
- Other attractions: Wine Club, Wine bar with full kitchen
- Distribution: On-site, wine festivals, NJ farmers' markets, NJ liquor stores, NJ restaurants, home shipment
- Tasting: Daily tastings
- Website: http://www.sharrottwinery.com/

Sharrott Winery (pronounced /ˈʃærət/ SHARR-ət) is a winery in the Blue Anchor section of Winslow Township in Camden County, New Jersey. Formerly an apple orchard, the vineyard was first planted in 2005, and opened to the public in 2008. Sharrott has 20 acres of grapes under cultivation, and produces 12,000 cases of wine per year. The winery is named after the family that owns it.

== Wines ==
Sharrott Winery is in the Outer Coastal Plain AVA, and produces wine from Cabernet Franc, Cabernet Sauvignon, Chambourcin, Chardonnay, Fredonia, Merlot, Pinot gris, Riesling, Vidal blanc, and Vignoles (Ravat 51) grapes.

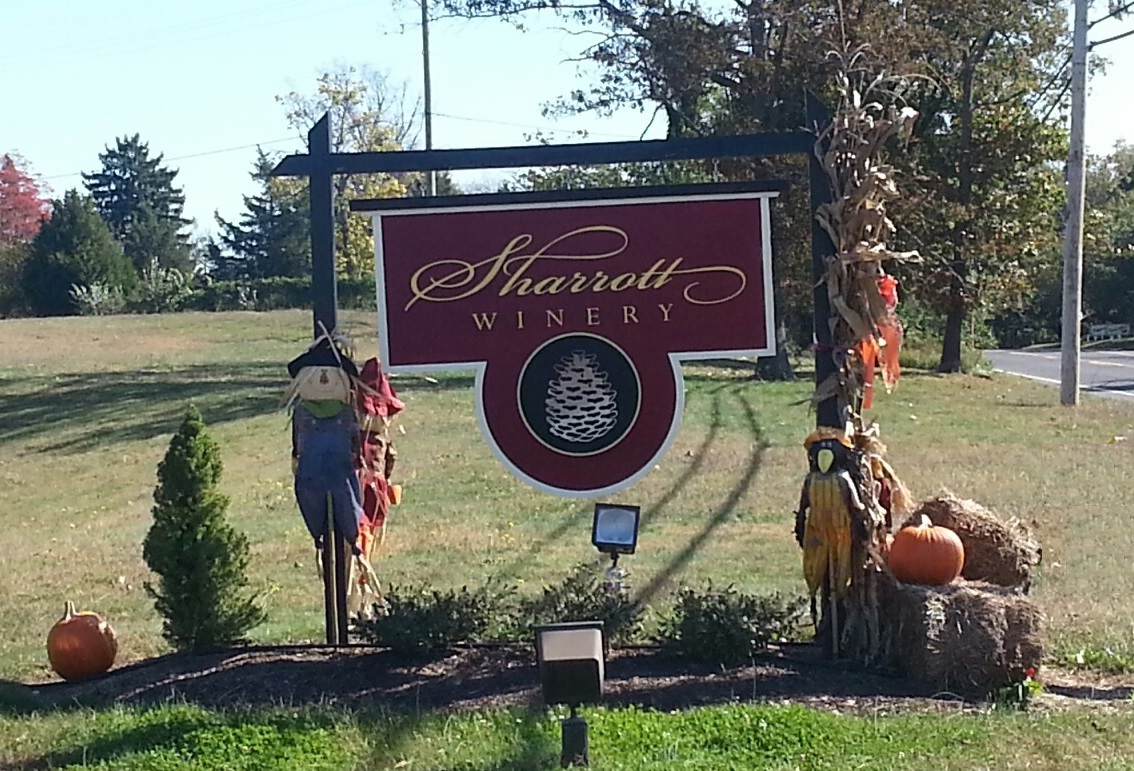
Decorated here for the autumn season, many events are held throughout the year at Sharrott Winery.

== Features, licensing, associations, and outlets ==
The entire winery facility is powered using solar energy. Sharrott has a plenary winery license from the New Jersey Division of Alcoholic Beverage Control, which allows it to produce an unrestricted amount of wine, operate up to 15 off-premises sales rooms, and ship up to 12 cases per year to consumers in-state or out-of-state. The winery is a member of the Garden State Wine Growers Association and the Outer Coastal Plain Vineyard Association. In 2013, Sharrott became the first winery in the state to have a theatre as an outlet where its wine is sold by the glass to patrons.

== See also ==
- Alcohol laws of New Jersey
- American wine
- Judgment of Princeton
- List of wineries, breweries, and distilleries in New Jersey
- New Jersey Farm Winery Act
- New Jersey Wine Industry Advisory Council
- New Jersey wine
