= Tomasello Winery =

Winery in Hammonton, New Jersey, U.S.

Coordinates: 39.642400°N 74.781234°W

- Location: 225 North White Horse Pike (Route 30), Hammonton, New Jersey, USA
- Coordinates: 39.642400 N, 74.781234 W
- Appellation: Outer Coastal Plain AVA
- First vines planted: 1888
- Opened to the public: 1933
- Key people: Frank Tomasello (founder); Charlie Tomasello, Jack Tomasello (owners)
- Acres cultivated: 70
- Cases/yr: 65,000 (2013)
- Other attractions: Picnicking permitted
- Distribution: On-site, wine festivals, NJ liquor stores, NJ outlet stores, home shipment
- Tasting: Daily tastings
- Website: http://www.tomasellowinery.com/

Tomasello Winery is a winery located in Hammonton in Atlantic County, New Jersey. Tomasello is the second-oldest active winery in the state, after Renault Winery. The vineyard was first planted in 1888, and opened to the public in 1933 after the end of Prohibition. Tomasello is one of the largest winegrowers in New Jersey, having 70 acres of grapes under cultivation, and producing 65,000 cases of wine per year. Although the winery is in Hammonton, most of the grapes are grown on three vineyards in the neighboring Winslow Township in Camden County. The winery is named after the family that owns it.

== Wines ==
Tomasello Winery is in the Outer Coastal Plain AVA. Its wines are made from a variety of fruits including:

Grape wines

- Baco noir
- Cabernet Franc
- Cabernet Sauvignon
- Catawba
- Chambourcin, Chardonnay
- Colombard
- Concord
- De Chaunac (Note: Tomasello Winery is the only New Jersey producer of wines using this grape)
- Landot noir
- Merlot
- Muscat blanc
- Niagara
- Noah
- Petit Verdot
- Pinot gris
- Pinot noir
- Riesling
- Rkatsiteli
- Sangiovese
- Seyval blanc
- Syrah
- Vidal blanc
- Villard blanc
- Villard noir (Note: Tomasello Winery is the only New Jersey producer of wines using this grape)

Non-grape wines

- almond
- apple
- blackberry
- blueberry
- cherry
- cranberry
- pomegranate
- raspberry

Tomasello was a participant at the Judgment of Princeton, a wine tasting organized by the American Association of Wine Economists that compared New Jersey wines to premium French vintages.

== Advocacy, licensing, associations, and outlets ==
Tomasello is an advocate of the direct shipping of wine from wineries to customers. Tomasello has a plenary winery license from the New Jersey Division of Alcoholic Beverage Control, which allows it to produce an unrestricted amount of wine, operate up to 15 off-premises sales rooms, and ship up to 12 cases per year to consumers in-state or out-of-state. The winery is a member of the Garden State Wine Growers Association and the Outer Coastal Plain Vineyard Association. Tomasello operates outlet stores in several New Jersey towns all of which are associated with local farms such as Chester, Freehold, Lambertville, Smithville, Cranford, and Wyckoff.

== See also ==
- Alcohol laws of New Jersey
- American wine
- List of wineries, breweries, and distilleries in New Jersey
- New Jersey Farm Winery Act
- New Jersey Wine Industry Advisory Council
- New Jersey wine
