= Auburn Road Vineyards =

Winery in New Jersey

Coordinates: 39.680020°N 75.367188°W

- Location: 117 Sharptown-Auburn Road, Pilesgrove, New Jersey, USA
- Coordinates: 39.680020 N, 75.367188 W
- Appellation: Outer Coastal Plain AVA
- First vines planted: 2004
- Opened to the public: 2007
- Key people: Julianne Donnini and Scott Donnini (owners)
- Area cultivated: 23
- Cases/yr: 5,200 (2018)
- Known for: Good Karma merlot blend
- Varietals: Gaia Cabernet Franc blend, Give Peach A Chance peach white wine blend, Pinot Grigio, the White Bottle Burgundian style Chardonnay, Dry Rose
- Other attractions: Bistro
- Distribution: On-site, wine festivals, NJ farmers' markets, liquor stores (DE, NJ, PA), restaurants (DE, NJ), home shipment
- Tasting: Tastings everyday, tours on weekends by reservation
- Website: http://www.auburnroadvineyards.com/

Auburn Road Vineyards is a winery in Pilesgrove Township in Salem County, New Jersey. The vineyard was first planted in 2004, and opened to the public in 2007. Auburn Road has 19 acres of grapes under cultivation, and produces 4,200 cases of wine per year. The winery is named for road near where it is located.

== Wines ==
Auburn Road Vineyards is in the Outer Coastal Plain AVA, and produces wine from Cabernet Franc, Cabernet Sauvignon, Cayuga White, Chambourcin, Chardonnay, Merlot, Niagara, Pinot gris, Sangiovese, and Vidal blanc grapes. Auburn Road also makes fruit wines from apples and peaches

== Advocacy, features, licensing, and associations ==
Auburn Road is an advocate of the direct shipping of wine from wineries to customers. The winery operates a bistro that sells cheeses, soups, and breads, and serves dinner on Friday night. Auburn Road has a plenary winery license from the New Jersey Division of Alcoholic Beverage Control, which allows it to produce an unrestricted amount of wine, operate up to 15 off-premises sales rooms, and ship up to 12 cases per year to consumers in-state or out-of-state. The winery is a member of the Garden State Wine Growers Association and the Outer Coastal Plain Vineyard Association.

== See also ==
- Alcohol laws of New Jersey
- American wine
- Judgment of Princeton
- List of wineries, breweries, and distilleries in New Jersey
- New Jersey Farm Winery Act
- New Jersey Wine Industry Advisory Council
- New Jersey wine
