= Monroeville Vineyard & Winery =

American winery located in New Jersey

Coordinates: 39.644013°N 75.174445°W

- Location: 314 Elmer-Richwood Road, Monroeville, New Jersey, USA
- Coordinates: 39.644013 N, 75.174445 W
- Appellation: Outer Coastal Plain AVA
- First vines planted: 2010
- Opened to the public: 2012
- Key people: John & Debra Basile (owners)
- Acres cultivated: 4
- Cases/yr: 1,800 (2013)
- Distribution: On-site, wine festivals, NJ farmers' markets, NJ liquor stores, NJ restaurants, home shipment
- Tasting: Tastings Thursday to Sunday
- Website: http://www.monroevillewinery.net/

Monroeville Vineyard & Winery is a winery in the unincorporated community of Monroeville, within Upper Pittsgrove Township, Salem County, New Jersey. The vineyard was first planted in 2010 and opened to the public in 2012. Monroeville has 4 acres of grapes under cultivation and produces approximately 1,800 cases of wine per year from New Jersey and Chilean grapes. The winery is named for the community where it is located.

== Wines ==
Monroeville Vineyard is in the Outer Coastal Plain AVA and produces wine from Cabernet Franc, Cabernet Sauvignon, Chardonnay, Concord, Grüner Veltliner, Merlot, Muscat of Alexandria, Pinot Gris, and Syrah grapes. Monroeville also makes fruit wines from apples, blueberries, cranberries, nectarines, peaches, and strawberries.

== Licensing and associations ==
Monroeville has a plenary winery license from the New Jersey Division of Alcoholic Beverage Control, which allows it to produce an unrestricted amount of wine, operate up to 15 off-premises sales rooms, and ship up to 12 cases per year to consumers in-state or out-of-state. The winery is a member of the Garden State Wine Growers Association and the Outer Coastal Plain Vineyard Association.

== See also ==
- Alcohol laws of New Jersey
- American wine
- Judgment of Princeton
- List of wineries, breweries, and distilleries in New Jersey
- New Jersey Farm Winery Act
- New Jersey Wine Industry Advisory Council
- New Jersey wine
