= Four JG's Orchards & Vineyards =

American winery located in New Jersey

Coordinates: 40.317470°N 74.213579°W

- Location: 127 Hillsdale Road, Colts Neck, New Jersey, United States
- Coordinates: 40.317470 N, 74.213579 W
- First vines planted: 1999
- Opened to the public: 2004
- Key people: John & Janet Giunco, Jill Giunco, John Giunco Jr. (owners)
- Acres cultivated: 40
- Cases/yr: 2,500 (2013)
- Distribution: On-site, wine festivals, NJ liquor stores, home shipment
- Tasting: Tastings on select weekends
- Website: http://www.4jgswinery.com/

Four JG's Orchards & Vineyards is a winery in Colts Neck in Monmouth County, New Jersey. The vineyard was first planted in 1999, and opened to the public in 2004. Four JG's has 40 acres of grapes under cultivation, and produces 2,500 cases of wine per year. The winery is named after the four family members that own it, all of whom have the initials "JG."

== Wines ==
Four JG's produces wine from Cabernet Franc, Cayuga White, Chambourcin, Chardonnay, Vidal blanc, and Vignoles (Ravat 51) grapes. The winery was a participant at the Judgment of Princeton, a wine tasting organized by the American Association of Wine Economists that compared New Jersey wines to premium French vintages. Four JG's is not located in one of New Jersey's three viticultural areas.

== Education, licensing, and associations ==
The winery assisted Monmouth University in creating an on-campus vineyard and winemaking program. Four JG's has a farm winery license from the New Jersey Division of Alcoholic Beverage Control, which allows it to produce up to 50,000 gallons of wine per year, operate up to 15 off-premises sales rooms, and ship up to 12 cases per year to consumers in-state or out-of-state. The winery is a member of the Garden State Wine Growers Association and the Outer Coastal Plain Vineyard Association.

== See also ==
- Alcohol laws of New Jersey
- American wine
- List of wineries, breweries, and distilleries in New Jersey
- New Jersey Farm Winery Act
- New Jersey Wine Industry Advisory Council
- New Jersey wine
