= Sylvin Farms Winery =

American winery located in New Jersey

Coordinates: 39.532994°N 74.583276°W

- Location: 24 North Vienna Avenue, Egg Harbor City, New Jersey, USA
- Coordinates: 39.532994 N, 74.583276 W
- Appellation: Outer Coastal Plain AVA
- First vines planted: 1977
- Opened to the public: 1985
- Key people: Frank Salek (owner)
- Acres cultivated: 11
- Cases/yr: 1,000 (2011)
- Distribution: On-site, subscription
- Tasting: Tastings by appointment
- Website: http://www.sylvinfarmswinery.com/

Sylvin Farms Winery is a winery in the Germania section of Galloway Township (mailing address is Egg Harbor City) in Atlantic County, New Jersey. The vineyard was first planted in 1977, and opened to the public in 1985. Sylvin Farms has 11 acres of grapes under cultivation, and produces 1,000 cases of wine per year. The winery’s name is an amalgamation of Sylvia and sylvan, reflecting the owner's wife's name and the surrounding Pine Barrens, respectively.

== Wines ==
Sylvin Farms Winery was a pioneer in the growing of vinifera grapes in New Jersey, rather than French hybrid or native labrusca grapes. Sylvin Farms is located in the Outer Coastal Plain AVA, and produces wine from Barbera, Cabernet Franc, Cabernet Sauvignon, Chardonnay, Corvina, Dolcetto, Merlot, Muscat Ottonel, Nebbiolo, Pinot blanc, Pinot gris, Pinot noir, Riesling, Rkatsiteli, Sangiovese, Sauvignon blanc, Sémillon, Syrah, Tempranillo, Viognier, and Zinfandel grapes. It is the only winery in New Jersey that produces wine from Corvina and Pinot Blanc – Corvina is a red grape indigenous to the Veneto region of Italy, whereas Pinot blanc is a white grape native to the Alsace region of France.

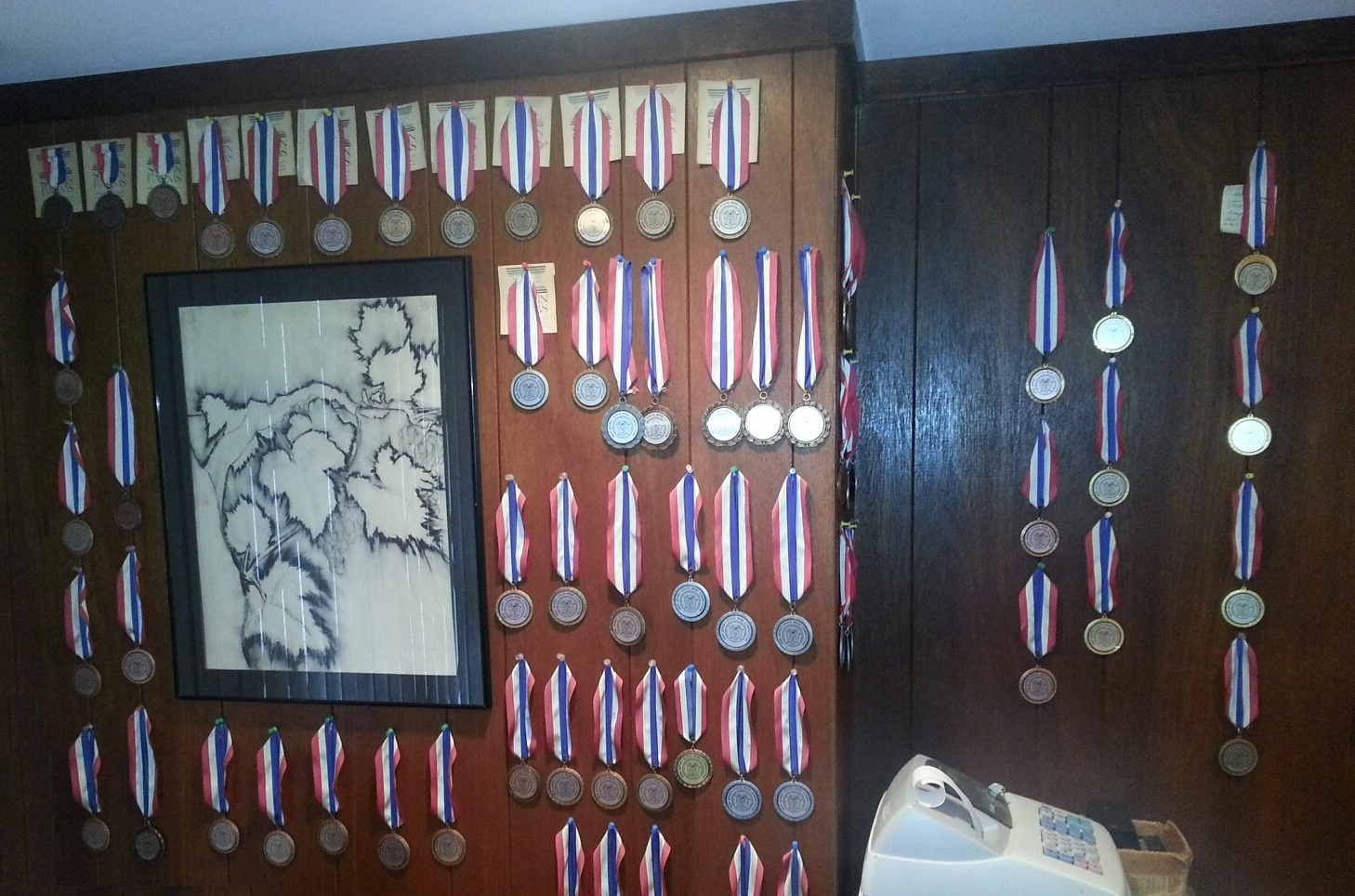
Sylvin Farms has won many awards and medals for its wines.

== Licensing and associations ==
Sylvin Farms has a farm winery license from the New Jersey Division of Alcoholic Beverage Control, which allows it to produce up to 50,000 gallons of wine per year, operate up to 15 off-premises sales rooms, and ship up to 12 cases per year to consumers in-state or out-of-state. The winery is a member of the Garden State Wine Growers Association and the Outer Coastal Plain Vineyard Association.

== See also ==
- Alcohol laws of New Jersey
- American wine
- Judgment of Princeton
- List of wineries, breweries, and distilleries in New Jersey
- New Jersey Farm Winery Act
- New Jersey Wine Industry Advisory Council
- New Jersey wine
