= William Heritage Winery =

American winery located in New Jersey

Coordinates: 39.721610°N 75.172909°W

Heritage Vineyards
- Location: 480 Mullica Hill Road, Mullica Hill, NJ, USA
- Coordinates: 39.721610 N, 75.172909 W
- Appellation: Outer Coastal Plain AVA
- First vines planted: 1998
- Opened to the public: 2002
- Key people: Bill & Penni Heritage, Richard Heritage (owners); Sean Comninos (winemaker)
- Area cultivated: 40
- Cases/yr: 13,000 (2012)
- Known for: Bordeaux-style wine
- Other attractions: Bistro, hayride, picnicking permitted, pet-friendly, petting zoo, pumpkin picking
- Distribution: On-site, wine festivals, NJ liquor stores, home shipment
- Tasting: Daily tastings, tours on Saturday
- Website: http://www.heritagewinenj.com/

William Heritage Winery (formerly known as Heritage Vineyards) is a winery in the Mullica Hill section of Harrison Township in Gloucester County, New Jersey. A family produce farm since 1853, the vineyard was first planted in 1998, and opened to the public in 2002. Heritage is one of the larger winegrowers in New Jersey, having 40 acres of grapes under cultivation, and producing 13,000 cases of wine per year. The winery is named after the family that owns it.

== Wines ==
Heritage Winery is in the Outer Coastal Plain AVA, and produces wine from Cabernet Franc, Cabernet Sauvignon, Chambourcin, Chardonnay, Concord, Grenache, Malbec, Merlot, Muscat blanc, Petit Verdot, Pinot gris, Pinot noir, Sauvignon blanc, Sémillon, and Syrah grapes. Heritage also makes fruit wines from apples, blueberries, peaches, and sugar plums. It is the only winery in New Jersey that produces wine from sugar plums. Heritage is best known for its signature Bordeaux-style wine. The winery was a participant at the Judgment of Princeton, a wine tasting organized by the American Association of Wine Economists that compared New Jersey wines to premium French vintages.

== Features, licensing and associations ==
During the autumn harvest season, Heritage offers pumpkin picking and hayrides, and throughout the year the winery operates a petting zoo and a bistro that sells breads, cheeses, and dips. Heritage has a plenary winery license from the New Jersey Division of Alcoholic Beverage Control, which allows it to produce an unrestricted amount of wine, operate up to 15 off-premises sales rooms, and ship up to 12 cases per year to consumers in-state or out-of-state. The winery is a member of the Garden State Wine Growers Association and the Outer Coastal Plain Vineyard Association.

== See also ==
- Alcohol laws of New Jersey
- American wine
- Judgment of Princeton
- List of wineries, breweries, and distilleries in New Jersey
- New Jersey Farm Winery Act
- New Jersey Wine Industry Advisory Council
- New Jersey wine
