= Hawk Haven Vineyard & Winery =

Winery in New Jersey, United States

Coordinates: 39.010001°N 74.890554°W

- Location: 600 South Railroad Avenue, Rio Grande, NJ, USA
- Coordinates: 39.010001 N, 74.890554 W
- Appellation: Outer Coastal Plain AVA
- First vines planted: 1997
- Opened to the public: 2009
- Key people: Todd & Kenna Wuerker (owners); Lalo Serra (viticulturalist)
- Acres cultivated: 16
- Cases/yr: 5,000
- Other attractions: live music, food trucks
- Distribution: On-site, wine festivals, NJ liquor stores, NJ restaurants, home shipment in NJ, PA, and FL
- Tasting: Tastings daily, tours on Saturday (daily in summer)
- Website: http://hawkhavenvineyard.com/

Hawk Haven Vineyard & Winery is a winery in Rio Grande section of Lower Township in Cape May County, New Jersey. A family dairy and produce farm since 1940, the vineyard was first planted in 1997, beginning with Cabernet Sauvignon. The winery opened their doors to the public in 2009 with their first vintage in 2007, which consisted of the American Kestrel White (an unoaked Chardonnay), Red Table Wine, Merlot, and Cabernet Sauvignon. Today, Hawk Haven has 16 acres of grapes under cultivation, and produces 5,000 cases of wine per year. The winery is named for the large number of hawks that migrate to the farm every year. They currently have sixteen different varietals and all of the grapes are harvested, pressed, fermented, aged, blended, and bottled on site.

== Wines ==
Hawk Haven Vineyard & Winery is located in the Outer Coastal Plain AVA, and produces wine from Albariño, Cabernet Franc, Cabernet Sauvignon, Chardonnay, Gewürztraminer, Merlot, Petit Verdot, Pinot Grigio, Riesling, Sangiovese, Sauvignon Blanc, Syrah, Tempranillo, Viognier, and Pinot Noir grapes. The vineyard serves as a winegrowing test site for Rutgers University to study whether Lagrein and Teroldego grapes can be grown in the climate of New Jersey. Hawk Haven is the only New Jersey winery that uses Lagrein and Teroldego, which are red vinifera grapes indigenous to the Trentino-South Tyrol region of Italy.

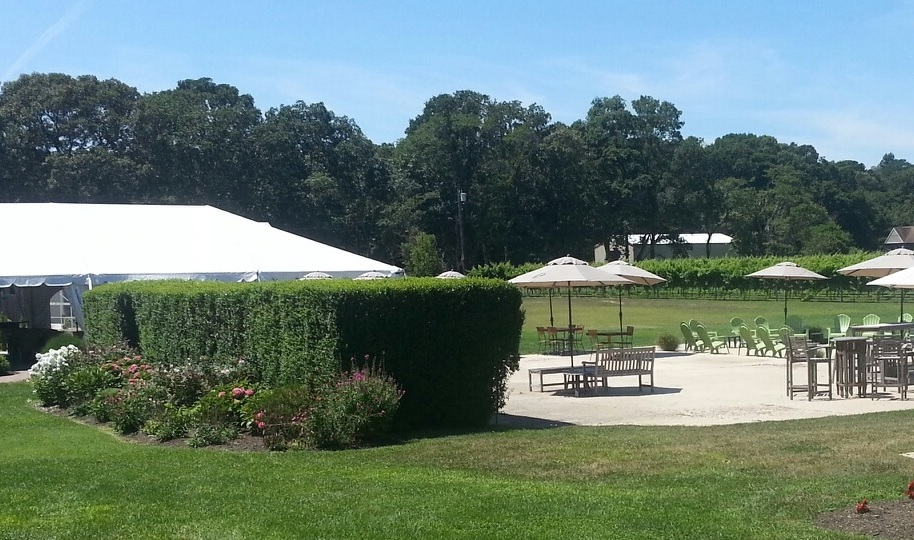
Hawk Haven permits customers to picnic and bring pets.

== Awards and associations ==
Hawk Haven wines have won numerous awards for many of their different varieties. The most notable awarded to the Cabernet Franc was the Governor's Cup as well as a gold medal at the 2016 NJ Wine Competition. The winery is a member of the Garden State Wine Growers Association and the Outer Coastal Plain Vineyard Association.

== See also ==
- Alcohol laws of New Jersey
- American wine
- Judgment of Princeton
- List of wineries, breweries, and distilleries in New Jersey
- New Jersey Farm Winery Act
- New Jersey Wine Industry Advisory Council
- New Jersey wine
