= Heritage station (disambiguation) =

A heritage station is a long-running radio station.

Heritage station may also refer to:

- Heritage station (Calgary), in Calgary, Alberta, Canada
- Heritage Station Vineyard, in Gloucester County, New Jersey, United States
- Heritage Square station, in Los Angeles, California, United States

== See also ==
- Heritage (disambiguation)
