= Sylvin =

Sylvin may refer to:

- Sylvin Farms Winery, a winery in New Jersey
- common name for potassium chloride

== See also ==
- Sylvite, potassium chloride in natural mineral form
- Sylvinite, ore mined for the production of potash
