= Sharrott =

Sharrott may refer to:

- Sharrott Winery, a winery in New Jersey

== People with the surname ==
- George Sharrott, Major League Baseball player
- Jack Sharrott, Major League Baseball player
