= Renault Winery =

American winery located in New Jersey

Coordinates: 39.544624°N 74.603557°W

Renault Winery Resort
- Location: 72 North Bremen Avenue, Egg Harbor City, New Jersey, USA
- Coordinates: 39.544624 N, 74.603557 W
- Appellation: Outer Coastal Plain AVA
- First vines planted: 1864
- Opened to the public: 1870
- Key people: Louis Nicolas Renault (Founder); Accountable Equity, LLC (Owner); VIVAMEE Hospitality(Operator)
- Area cultivated: 48
- Cases/yr: 20,000 (2013)
- Other attractions: Hotel, Dining, Golf Course, Entertainment & Events
- Website: http://www.renaultwinery.com/

Renault Winery (/rɪˈnɔːlt/ rih-KNOW) is a winery located in Egg Harbor City and Galloway Township in Atlantic County, New Jersey. It is the oldest active winery in the state in New Jersey. Renault is one of the larger winegrowers in New Jersey, having 48 acres of grapes under cultivation, and producing 20,000 cases of wine per year. The winery is named after its founder.

== History ==
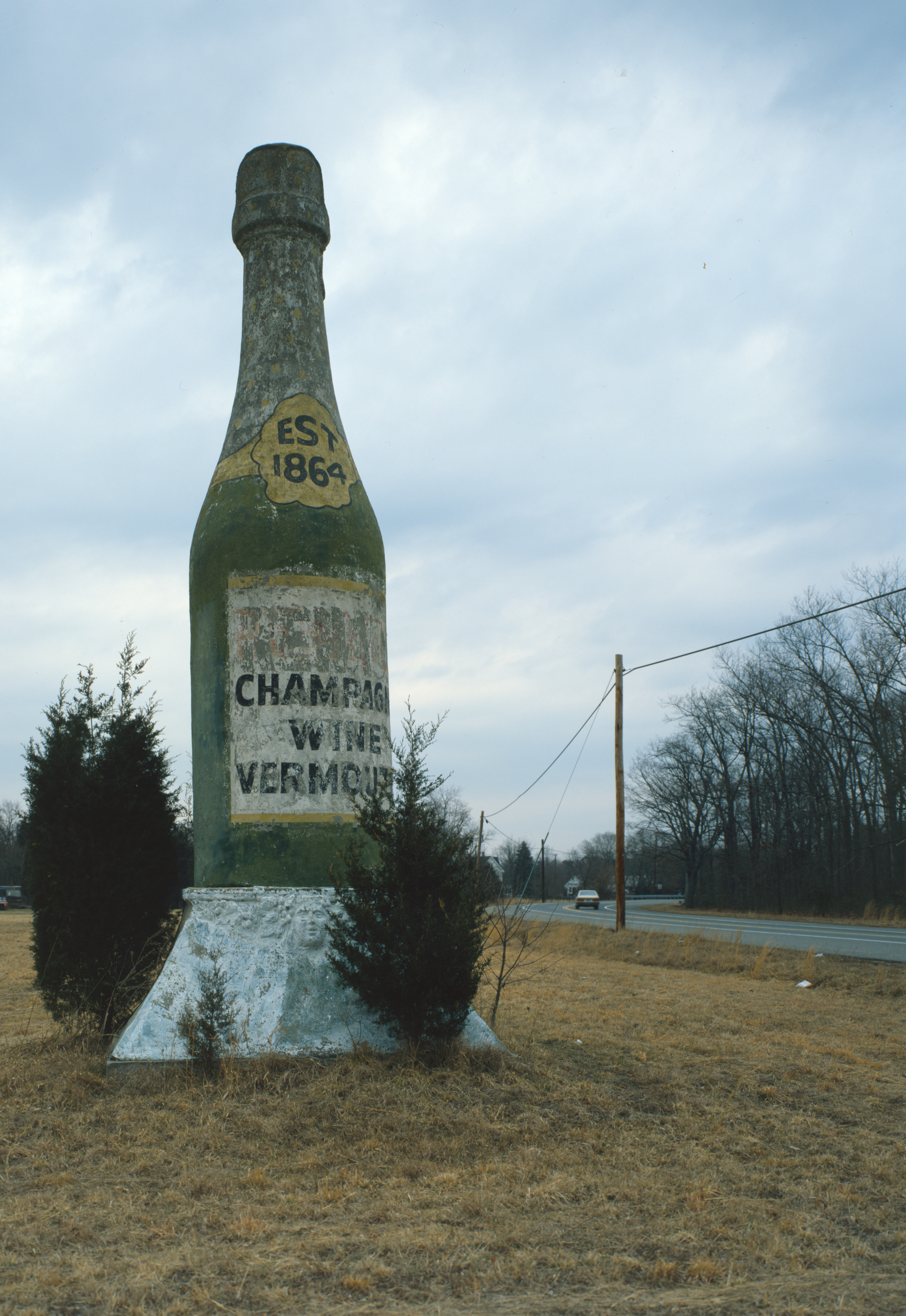
Advertisement for the winery along US 9 in New Gretna

The vineyard was first planted in 1864 by Louis Nicolas Renault, a French immigrant from Mareuil-sur-Ay who brought the original vinifera grapes from France. Renault opened to the public in 1870, and for many years was the largest producer of champagne in the United States. Renault survived the Prohibition era by obtaining licenses to produce sacramental wine as well as various medicinal wines, including "Renault Wine Tonic" which was sold by pharmacists across the United States. Mildred Norman, decades before her treks across the continent as Peace Pilgrim, worked in the winery as a secretary.

After World War II, Atlantic City political boss and racketeer Enoch "Nucky" Johnson was employed by Renault. While the winery once cultivated 600 acres of grapes, and sold 500,000 cases of wine per year, production has decreased substantially in recent decades. The winery has instead developed into a resort, opening a restaurant in 1983, a hotel and second restaurant in 2000, and a golf course in 2004.

=== Financial struggles ===
The winery filed for bankruptcy in 2014, and was purchased by OceanFirst Bank, its primary creditor, in 2015. In late 2018 the bank announced the sale of the property to the newly formed Renault Properties LLC. In 2019 Galloway Township agreed to help Renault Winery with its planned rehabilitation via a tax abatement plan.

== Wines ==
Renault Winery is located in the Outer Coastal Plain AVA, and produces wine from Baco noir, Cabernet Franc, Cabernet Sauvignon, Cayuga White, Chardonnay, Merlot, Noah, Norton (Cynthiana), Petit Verdot, Pinot gris, Pinot noir, Riesling, Sangiovese, Sauvignon blanc, Vidal blanc. Renault also makes fruit wines from blueberries, and is the only winery in the United States to make a blueberry champagne.

== Features, licensing, and associations ==
The winery is located on a 1400-acre site which includes an 18-hole golf course, a 55-room hotel, and two restaurants. Renault has a plenary winery license from the New Jersey Division of Alcoholic Beverage Control, which allows it to produce an unrestricted amount of wine, operate up to 15 off-premises sales rooms, and ship up to 12 cases per year to consumers in-state or out-of-state. Renault is a member of the Garden State Wine Growers Association and the Outer Coastal Plain Vineyard Association.

== See also ==
- Alcohol laws of New Jersey
- American wine
- Judgment of Princeton
- List of wineries, breweries, and distilleries in New Jersey
- New Jersey Farm Winery Act
- New Jersey Wine Industry Advisory Council
- New Jersey wine
