= Auburn Road =

Auburn Road can refer to:

- Auburn Road (Queensland), a road near Chinchilla, Queensland.
- Auburn Road, a 19th-century New York railroad, in 1853 absorbed into the New York Central Railroad.
- Auburn Road Vineyards, a winery in New Jersey.
