= Westfall Winery =

Coordinates: 41.326639°N 74.725228°W

- Location: 141 Clove Road, Montague, New Jersey, USA
- Coordinates: 41.326639 N, 74.725228 W
- First vines planted: 2000
- Opened to the public: 2003
- Key people: Loren & Georgene Mortimer, Charles Mortimer (owners)
- Area cultivated: 6
- Cases/yr: 9,000 (2011)
- Other attractions: Horse boarding, picnicking permitted, pet-friendly
- Distribution: On-site, NJ liquor stores, home shipment
- Tasting: Tastings Fri. to Sun. in summer Sat. and Sun. in spring and fall Closed in winter except for events
- Website: http://www.westfallwinery.com/

Westfall Winery was a winery in Montague Township in Sussex County, New Jersey. Formerly a stop on the Underground Railroad and a dairy farm, the vineyard was first planted in 2000, and opened to the public in 2003. Westfall had 6 acres of grapes under cultivation, and produced 9,000 cases of wine per year, mostly from imported grapes. The winery was named for the family that owned the farm from 1774 to 1940. It was sold in December 2017 and became an animal sanctuary.

== Wines ==
Westfall Winery produced grape wine and also made fruit wines from apples, blackberries, blueberries, cranberries, and peaches.

== Other features and properties ==
When operating as a winery, the farm also offered equestrian services, including horse boarding, and specialized in the use of Morgan horses. In 2006, the owners of Westfall founded Island Winery in Hilton Head, South Carolina.

== See also ==
- List of wineries, breweries, and distilleries in New Jersey
- New Jersey Farm Winery Act
- New Jersey Wine Industry Advisory Council
- New Jersey wine
