= Pilesgrove Township, New Jersey =

Township in Salem County, New Jersey, US

- Township
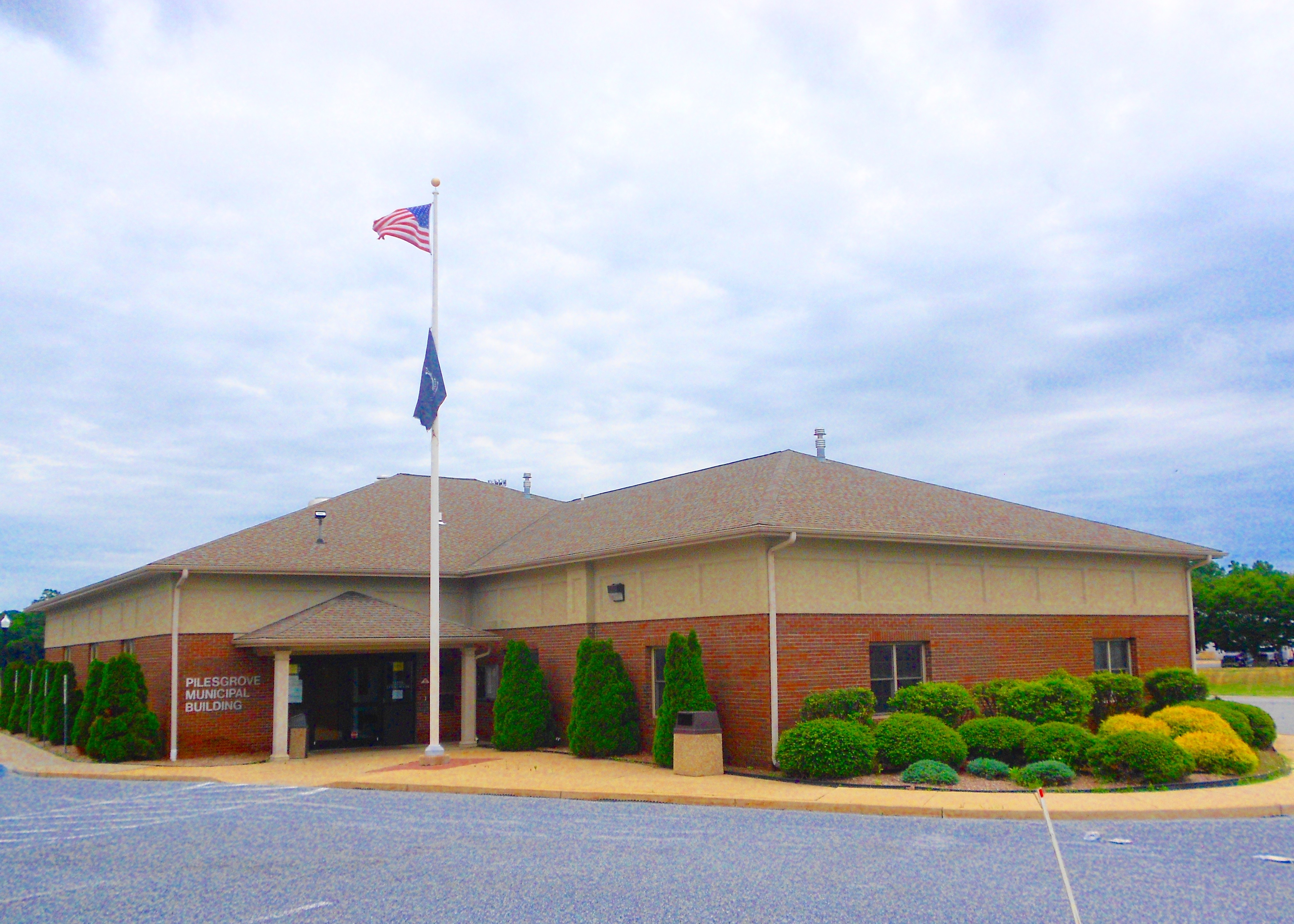
- Municipal Building

- Seal

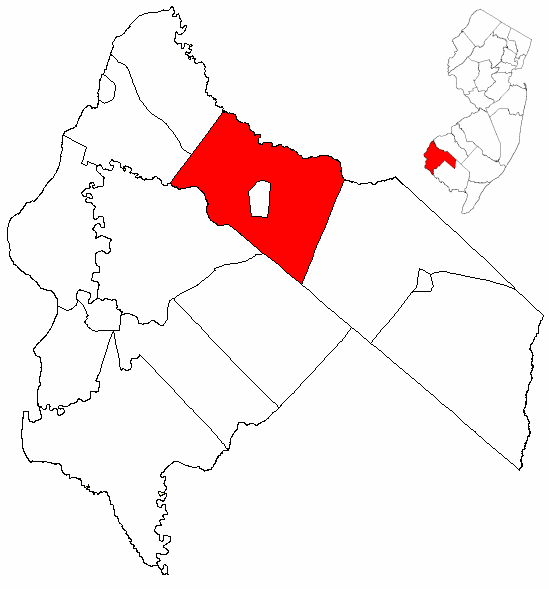
- Pilesgrove Township highlighted in Salem County. Inset map: Salem County highlighted in the State of New Jersey.

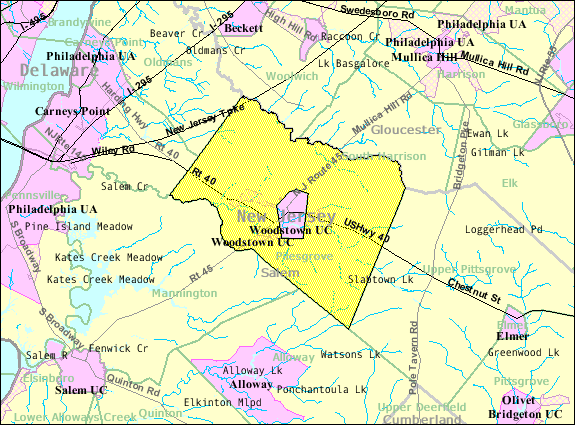
- Census Bureau map of Pilesgrove Township, New Jersey

- Location in Salem County Location in New Jersey Location in the United States
- Coordinates: 39.664363°N 75.395772°W
- Country: United States
- State: New Jersey
- County: Salem
- Earliest mention: April 15, 1701
- Incorporated: February 21, 1798

Government
  - Type: Township
  - Body: Township Committee
  - Mayor: Kevin Eachus (R, term ends December 31, 2023)
  - Administrator / Municipal clerk: Melissa Fackler

Area
  - Total: 35.17 sq mi (91.09 km^{2})
  - Land: 34.93 sq mi (90.48 km^{2})
  - Water: 0.24 sq mi (0.61 km^{2}) 0.67%
  - Rank: 69th of 565 in state 5th of 15 in county
- Elevation: 62 ft (19 m)

Population (2020)
  - Total: 4,183
  - Estimate (2023): 4,224
  - Rank: 409th of 565 in state 6th of 15 in county
  - Density: 119.7/sq mi (46.2/km^{2})
  - Rank: 532nd of 565 in state 8th of 15 in county
- Time zone: UTC−05:00 (Eastern (EST))
  - Summer (DST): UTC−04:00 (Eastern (EDT))
- ZIP Code: 08098
- Area code: 856 exchange: 769
- FIPS code: 3403358530
- GNIS feature ID: 0882132
- Website: www.pilesgrovenj.org

Pilesgrove Township is a township in Salem County, in the U.S. state of New Jersey. As of the 2020 United States census, the township's population was 4,183, an increase of 167 (+4.2%) from the 2010 census count of 4,016, which in turn reflected an increase of 93 (+2.4%) from the 3,923 counted in the 2000 census.

Pile's Grove was first mentioned in a deed dated April 15, 1701, through the date of the township's original corporation is unknown. Pilesgrove was incorporated as one of New Jersey's original group of 104 townships that were established on February 21, 1798. Portions of the township were taken on December 6, 1769, to form Pittsgrove Township and on July 26, 1882, to create Woodstown. The township was named for Thomas Pyle.

In 1979, Pilesgrove Township enacted the state's first right-to-farm law, protecting farming as a "natural right hereby ordained to exist as a permitted use everywhere in the Township of Pilesgrove."

== Geography ==
According to the United States Census Bureau, the township had a total area of 35.17 square miles (91.09 km^{2}), including 34.94 square miles (90.48 km^{2}) of land and 0.23 square miles (0.61 km^{2}) of water (0.67%). The Salem River flows through the township.

The township borders the Salem County municipalities of Alloway Township, Carneys Point Township, Mannington Township, Oldmans Township and Upper Pittsgrove Township. Pilesgrove Township also borders Gloucester County. The Borough of Woodstown is an independent municipality completely surrounded by Pilesgrove Township, making it part of 21 pairs of "doughnut towns" in the state, where one municipality entirely surrounds another. Woodstown serves as the more densely settled commercial core of the paired communities, while Pilesgrove is more agricultural.

Unincorporated communities in the township include Avis Mills, Courees Landing, East Lake, Eldridges Hill, Fenwick, Friendship, Milltown, Paulding, Point Airy, Richmanville, Sharptown, Union Grove and Yorktown. The census-designated place of Auburn is in the northwest part of the township, extending into Oldmans Township.

The Pilesgrove Solar Farm is one of the largest in the state, covering 100 acres (40 ha) with 71,000 solar panels that generate 20 megawatts of electricity, enough to provide power for more than 5,000 homes.

== Demographics ==
Historical population
Census	Pop.	Note	%±
1810	1,756		—
1820	2,012		14.6%
1830	2,150		6.9%
1840	2,477		15.2%
1850	2,962		19.6%
1860	3,359		13.4%
1870	3,385		0.8%
1880	3,007		−11.2%
1890	1,796	*	−40.3%
1900	1,744		−2.9%
1910	1,606		−7.9%
1920	1,770		10.2%
1930	1,815		2.5%
1940	1,614		−11.1%
1950	1,942		20.3%
1960	2,519		29.7%
1970	2,706		7.4%
1980	2,810		3.8%
1990	3,250		15.7%
2000	3,923		20.7%
2010	4,016		2.4%
2020	4,183		4.2%
2023 (est.)	4,224		1.0%
Population sources: 1810–2000; 1810–1920 1840 1850–1870; 1850 1870 1880–1890; 1890–1910 1910–1930; 1940–2000 2000; 2010 2020 * = Lost territory in previous decade.

=== 2010 census ===
The 2010 United States census counted 4,016 people, 1,488 households, and 1,091 families in the township. The population density was 115.3 inhabitants per square mile (44.5/km^{2}). There were 1,594 housing units at an average density of 45.7 per square mile (17.6/km^{2}). The racial makeup was 90.81% (3,647) White, 5.93% (238) Black or African American, 0.12% (5) Native American, 0.92% (37) Asian, 0.12% (5) Pacific Islander, 0.72% (29) from other races, and 1.37% (55) from two or more races. Hispanic or Latino of any race were 2.59% (104) of the population.

Of the 1,488 households, 27.5% had children under the age of 18; 63.9% were married couples living together; 6.1% had a female householder with no husband present and 26.7% were non-families. Of all households, 21.5% were made up of individuals and 14.8% had someone living alone who was 65 years of age or older. The average household size was 2.62 and the average family size was 3.08.

20.4% of the population were under the age of 18, 7.4% from 18 to 24, 18.8% from 25 to 44, 32.4% from 45 to 64, and 21.0% who were 65 years of age or older. The median age was 47.3 years. For every 100 females, the population had 93.7 males. For every 100 females ages 18 and older there were 93.5 males.

The Census Bureau's 2006–2010 American Community Survey showed that (in 2010 inflation-adjusted dollars) median household income was $87,083 (with a margin of error of +/− $12,552) and the median family income was $102,870 (+/− $13,121). Males had a median income of $63,352 (+/− $12,197) versus $59,700 (+/− $6,558) for females. The per capita income for the borough was $34,966 (+/− $3,754). About 0.8% of families and 4.4% of the population were below the poverty line, including 9.5% of those under age 18 and 4.2% of those age 65 or over.

=== 2000 census ===
As of the 2000 United States census there were 3,923 people, 1,216 households, and 994 families residing in the township. The population density was 112.4 inhabitants per square mile (43.4/km^{2}). There were 1,261 housing units at an average density of 36.1 per square mile (13.9/km^{2}). The racial makeup of the township was 84.63% White, 12.18% African American, 0.28% Native American, 0.92% Asian, 0.05% Pacific Islander, 1.07% from other races, and 0.87% from two or more races. Hispanic or Latino of any race were 2.98% of the population.

There were 1,216 households, out of which 35.4% had children under the age of 18 living with them, 71.1% were married couples living together, 7.0% had a female householder with no husband present, and 18.2% were non-families. 14.9% of all households were made up of individuals, and 6.8% had someone living alone who was 65 years of age or older. The average household size was 2.91 and the average family size was 3.24.

In the township the population was spread out, with 23.8% under the age of 18, 8.4% from 18 to 24, 27.2% from 25 to 44, 26.2% from 45 to 64, and 14.4% who were 65 years of age or older. The median age was 40 years. For every 100 females, there were 107.1 males. For every 100 females age 18 and over, there were 107.9 males.

The median income for a household in the township was $66,042, and the median income for a family was $71,629. Males had a median income of $50,833 versus $31,806 for females. The per capita income for the township was $27,400. About 2.3% of families and 3.4% of the population were below the poverty line, including 2.8% of those under age 18 and 2.8% of those age 65 or over.

== Culture ==
Cowtown Rodeo is the only professional weekly rodeo in the state of New Jersey. It is known as the oldest weekly professional rodeo in the United States alongside being one of the oldest overall. The season typically spans from late May on Memorial Day Weekend to late September.

== Government ==
=== Local government ===
Pilesgrove is governed under the Township form of New Jersey municipal government, one of 141 municipalities (of the 564) statewide that use this form, the second-most commonly used form of government in the state. The Township Committee consists of three members elected at-large in partisan elections to serve three-year terms on a staggered basis, with one seat coming up for election each year as part of the November general election in a three-year cycle. At an annual reorganization meeting, the council selects one of its members to serves as mayor and another as deputy mayor.

As of 2022, members of the Pilesgrove Township Committee are Mayor Kevin Eachus (R, term on committee ends December 31, 2024; term as mayor ends 2022), Deputy Mayor David R. Bonowski (R, term on committee ends 2023; term as deputy mayor ends 2022) and Joseph Crevino (R, 2022).

In August 2014, the Township Council selected Joseph Crevino to fill the vacant seat of Jessie B. Smith, who had resigned the previous month from a term expiring in December 2016.

In 2018, the township had an average property tax bill of $8,387, the highest in the county, compared to an average bill of $8,767 statewide.

=== Federal, state and county representation ===
Pilesgrove Township is located in the 2nd Congressional District and is part of New Jersey's 3rd state legislative district.

For the 119th United States Congress, New Jersey's 2nd congressional district is represented by Jeff Van Drew (R, Dennis Township). New Jersey is represented in the United States Senate by Democrats Cory Booker (Newark, term ends 2027) and Andy Kim (Moorestown, term ends 2031).

For the 2026–2027 session, the 3rd legislative district of the New Jersey Legislature is represented in the State Senate by John Burzichelli (D, Paulsboro) and in the General Assembly by David Bailey (D, Woodstown) and Heather Simmons (D, Glassboro).

Salem County is governed by a five-member Board of County Commissioners who are elected at-large to serve three-year terms of office on a staggered basis, with either one or two seats coming up for election each year. At an annual reorganization meeting held in the beginning of January, the board selects a Director and a Deputy Director from among its members. As of 2025, Salem County's Commissioners (with party, residence, and term-end year listed in parentheses) are:

Director Benjamin H. Laury (R, Elmer, 2027), Deputy Director Cordy Taylor (R, Oldmans Township, 2028), Paul Collier (R, Lower Alloways Creek, 2027), Ed Ramsey (R, Pittsgrove Township, 2026), and Daniel Timmerman (R, Elmer, 2028).

Constitutional officers elected on a countywide basis are: Clerk Dale A. Cross (R, Pennsville Township, 2029), Sheriff Charles M. Miller (R, Salem, 2027) and Surrogate Gordon J. Ostrum Jr. (R, Pilesgrove Township, 2030).

=== Politics ===
As of March 2011, there were a total of 2,908 registered voters in Pilesgrove Township, of which 678 (23.3% vs. 30.6% countywide) were registered as Democrats, 873 (30.0% vs. 21.0%) were registered as Republicans and 1,354 (46.6% vs. 48.4%) were registered as Unaffiliated. There were 3 voters registered as Libertarians or Greens. Among the township's 2010 Census population, 72.4% (vs. 64.6% in Salem County) were registered to vote, including 90.9% of those ages 18 and over (vs. 84.4% countywide).

Gubernatorial election results for Pilesgrove Township
Year	Republican		Democratic		Third party(ies)	
Year	No.	%	No.	%	No.	%
2025	1,111	59.41%	746	39.89%	13	0.70%
2021	1,066	64.92%	567	34.53%	9	0.55%
2017	762	54.04%	584	41.42%	64	4.54%
2013	1,035	70.84%	390	26.69%	36	2.46%
2009	869	51.03%	629	36.93%	205	12.04%
2005	831	53.75%	635	41.07%	80	5.17%

In the 2012 presidential election, Republican Mitt Romney received 56.5% of the vote (1,273 cast), ahead of Democrat Barack Obama with 42.1% (950 votes), and other candidates with 1.4% (31 votes), among the 2,278 ballots cast by the township's 2,990 registered voters (24 ballots were spoiled), for a turnout of 76.2%. In the 2008 presidential election, Republican John McCain received 1,255 votes (53.2% vs. 46.6% countywide), ahead of Democrat Barack Obama with 1,051 votes (44.6% vs. 50.4%) and other candidates with 26 votes (1.1% vs. 1.6%), among the 2,358 ballots cast by the township's 2,911 registered voters, for a turnout of 81.0% (vs. 71.8% in Salem County). In the 2004 presidential election, Republican George W. Bush received 1,246 votes (58.8% vs. 52.5% countywide), ahead of Democrat John Kerry with 845 votes (39.9% vs. 45.9%) and other candidates with 22 votes (1.0% vs. 1.0%), among the 2,120 ballots cast by the township's 2,695 registered voters, for a turnout of 78.7% (vs. 71.0% in the whole county).

United States presidential election results for Pilesgrove Township 2024 2020 2016 2012 2008 2004
Year	Republican		Democratic		Third party(ies)	
Year	No.	%	No.	%	No.	%
2024	1,400	59.55%	912	38.79%	39	1.66%
2020	1,495	58.17%	1,040	40.47%	35	1.36%
2016	1,290	57.38%	848	37.72%	110	4.89%
2012	1,273	56.48%	950	42.15%	31	1.38%
2008	1,255	53.82%	1,051	45.07%	26	1.11%
2004	1,246	58.97%	845	39.99%	22	1.04%

In the 2013 gubernatorial election, Republican Chris Christie received 70.8% of the vote (1,035 cast), ahead of Democrat Barbara Buono with 26.7% (390 votes), and other candidates with 2.5% (36 votes), among the 1,478 ballots cast by the township's 3,003 registered voters (17 ballots were spoiled), for a turnout of 49.2%. In the 2009 gubernatorial election, Republican Chris Christie received 869 votes (50.4% vs. 46.1% countywide), ahead of Democrat Jon Corzine with 629 votes (36.5% vs. 39.9%), Independent Chris Daggett with 187 votes (10.8% vs. 9.7%) and other candidates with 18 votes (1.0% vs. 2.0%), among the 1,724 ballots cast by the township's 2,919 registered voters, yielding a 59.1% turnout (vs. 47.3% in the county).

United States Senate election results for Pilesgrove Township1
Year	Republican		Democratic		Third party(ies)	
Year	No.	%	No.	%	No.	%
2024	1,373	58.80%	920	39.40%	42	1.80%
2018	1,148	60.87%	657	34.84%	81	4.29%
2012	1,172	53.08%	974	44.11%	62	2.81%
2006	938	56.24%	682	40.89%	48	2.88%

United States Senate election results for Pilesgrove Township2
Year	Republican		Democratic		Third party(ies)	
Year	No.	%	No.	%	No.	%
2020	1,456	57.75%	1,021	40.50%	44	1.75%
2014	874	57.58%	588	38.74%	56	3.69%
2013	483	59.12%	328	40.15%	6	0.73%
2008	1,158	50.92%	1,035	45.51%	81	3.56%

== Education ==
The Woodstown-Pilesgrove Regional School District serves public school students in pre-kindergarten through twelfth grade from Woodstown and Pilesgrove Township. As of the 2020–21 school year, the district, comprised of four schools, had an enrollment of 1,425 students and 126.5 classroom teachers (on an FTE basis), for a student–teacher ratio of 11.3:1. Schools in the district (with 2020–21 enrollment data from the National Center for Education Statistics) are William Roper Early Childhood Learning Center with 83 students in grades PreK-K, Mary S. Shoemaker Elementary School with 470 students in grades 1-5, Woodstown Middle School with 278 students in grades 6-8 and Woodstown High School with 579 students in grades 9-12. Students from neighboring Alloway Township, Oldmans Township and Upper Pittsgrove Township attend the high school as part of sending/receiving relationships. A majority of public school students in grades 9–12 from Oldmans Township attend Penns Grove High School as part of a sending/receiving relationship with the Penns Grove-Carneys Point Regional School District, with the balance attending Woodstown High School.

== Transportation ==
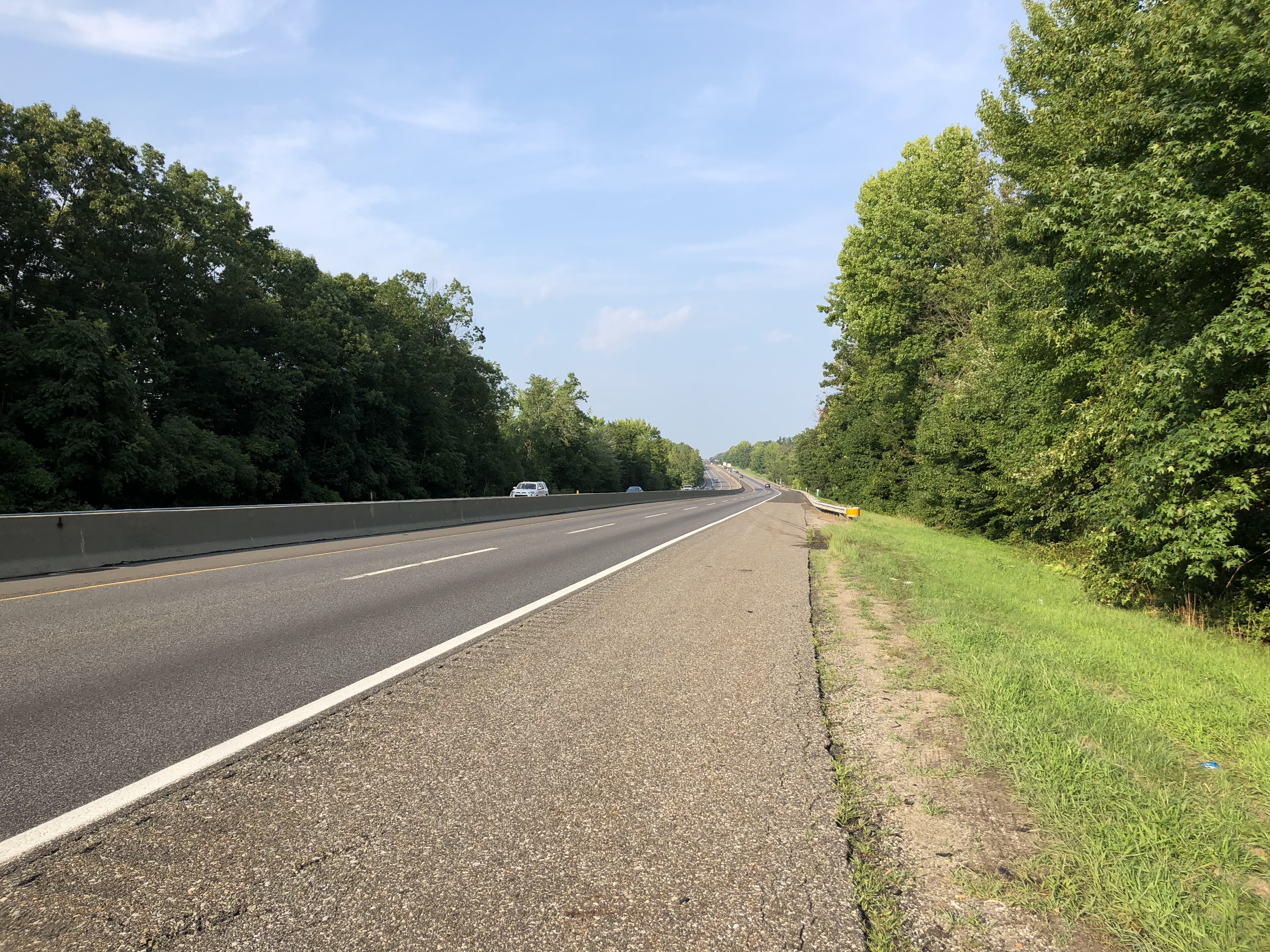
The northbound New Jersey Turnpike in Pilesgrove Township

=== Roads and highways ===
As of May 2010, the township had a total of 85.39 miles (137.42 km) of roadways, of which 43.86 miles (70.59 km) were maintained by the municipality, 29.94 miles (48.18 km) by Salem County, 10.79 miles (17.36 km) by the New Jersey Department of Transportation and 0.80 miles (1.29 km) by the New Jersey Turnpike Authority.

The New Jersey Turnpike crosses the northwest corner of Pilesgrove Township. U.S. Route 40 traverses the township roughly east to west and Route 45 crosses the township roughly south to north, with the two roadways meeting in Woodstown, the donut hole at the center. County Route 581 cuts through the southeast corner.

=== Public transportation ===
NJ Transit provides bus service between Salem and Philadelphia on the 401 route.

The 18.6-mile (29.9 km) southern portion of the freight rail Salem Branch, operated under contract by Southern Railroad of New Jersey, runs through the township.

== Wineries ==
- Auburn Road Vineyard
- Chestnut Run Farm

== Notable people ==
People who were born in, residents of, or otherwise closely associated with Pilesgrove Township include:

- Jim Cook Jr. (born 1987), former journalist for the South Jersey Times
- Nathan Dunn (1782–1844), businessman and philanthropist
- Nathan T. Stratton (1813–1887), represented New Jersey's 1st congressional district in the United States House of Representatives from 1851 to 1855
