= Garden State Wine Growers Association =

The Garden State Wine Growers Association (GSWGA) is an industry trade association established as an advocate for New Jersey's wine grape growers, providing leadership on research and education programs, public policies, sustainable farming practices and trade policy to enhance the New Jersey wine grape growing business and communities. The association sponsors multiple wine festivals each year. Vintage North Jersey, a subsidiary of the Garden State Wine Growers Association, was founded in 2013. Vintage North Jersey includes ten wineries in northwestern New Jersey, and received a $16,000 tourism grant from the state of New Jersey.

== Members ==
Of New Jersey's 48 wineries, 40 are members of the Garden State Wine Growers Association. The 10 GSWGA wineries that are also members of Vintage North Jersey are marked with "(VNJ)"

- Amalthea Cellars
- Auburn Road Vineyards
- Bellview Winery
- Beneduce Vineyards (VNJ)
- Brook Hollow Winery (VNJ)
- Cape May Winery & Vineyard
- Cava Winery and Vineyard (VNJ)
- Cedarvale Winery
- Chestnut Run Farm
- Coda Rossa Winery
- Cream Ridge Winery
- DiBella Winery
- DiMatteo Vineyards
- Four JG's Orchards & Vineyards
- Four Sisters Winery (VNJ)
- Hawk Haven Vineyard & Winery
- Heritage Vineyards
- Hopewell Valley Vineyards
- Jessie Creek Winery
- Laurita Winery
- Monroeville Vineyard & Winery
- Natali Vineyards
- Old York Cellars (VNJ)
- Peppadew Fresh Vineyards
- Plagido's Winery
- Renault Winery
- Sharrott Winery
- Southwind Vineyard & Winery
- Summit City Winery
- Sylvin Farms Winery
- Terhune Orchards (VNJ)
- Tomasello Winery
- Unionville Vineyards (VNJ)
- Valenzano Winery
- Ventimiglia Vineyard (VNJ)
- Villa Milagro Vineyards (VNJ)
- Wagonhouse Winery
- Westfall Winery (VNJ)
- Willow Creek Winery
- Working Dog Winery

== See also ==
- Alcohol laws of New Jersey
- American wine
- Judgment of Princeton
- List of wineries, breweries, and distilleries in New Jersey
- New Jersey Division of Alcoholic Beverage Control
- New Jersey Farm Winery Act
- New Jersey Wine Industry Advisory Council
- New Jersey wine
- Outer Coastal Plain AVA
- Warren Hills AVA
- Central Delaware Valley AVA
