= Ives noir =

Variety of grape

- Grape (Vitis)
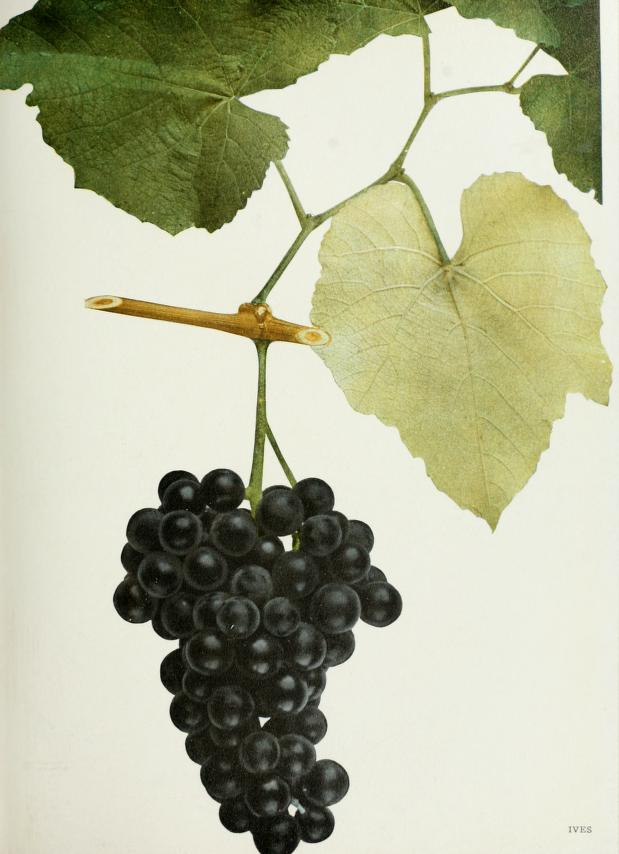
- Photographic plate of Ives grape from the book The Grapes of New York, 1908 by Ulysses Prentiss Hedrick
- Color of berry skin: Red
- Species: Hybrid grape
- Origin: Ohio in 1844
- VIVC number: 5592

Ives noir is a red hybrid grape variety that is grown throughout the United States. Named after its propagator, Cincinnati wine grower Henry Ives, the grape's pedigree and exact origin are unclear. After Prohibition in the United States, Ives was a popular grape used in the production of sweet, port-style wines but saw its plantings steadily decrease throughout the 20th century as the vine's susceptibility to air pollution took its toll.

== History and pedigree ==
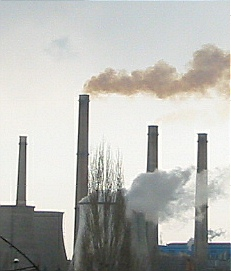
While Ives noir was a popular grape after the end of Prohibition, the vine's susceptibility to air pollution caused plantings of the variety to decline throughout the 20th century.

According to the Vitis International Variety Catalogue (VIVC), the grape was first developed in Ohio in 1844 from a crossing of an unknown Vitis species and Hartford Proflic (itself a crossing of an unknown Vitis labrusca vine and Isabella that was developed in Connecticut). The National Grape Registry maintained by the University of California, Davis lists 1850 as the release date. Writings from Henry Ives himself date the crossing to 1840. However, the earliest record of Hartford Prolific being cultivated dates back to 1846 with the VIVC dating the crossing even later, to 1849.

This inconsistency puts the pedigree of Ives noir in question. In other writings, Henry Ives claimed that he cultivated the grape from a seedling of a Vitis vinifera variety called either "Malaga" or "Madeira" but ampelographers as early as the late 19th century found little evidence to support any vinifera pedigree or relationship to the Malaga wine grapes Pedro Ximénez and Moscatel or the traditional Madeira wine grapes of Malvasia, Bual, Verdelho, Sercial, Terrantez and Bastardo.

Employing an extensive set of microsatellite DNA markers, de Oliveira's research group in São Paulo, Brazil, revealed in a 2020 publication, that the Bordô hybrid cultivar (a.k.a. Gran d'Oro in Brazil) is identical to the Ives' Seedling cultivar (a.k.a. Ives noir) from the US.

Dr. Jeronimo (Jerry) Rodrigues (South Africa) further analysed Ives' microsatellite DNA which can now be downloaded from the Vitis International Variety Catalogue (VIVC) database (Maul and Röckel, 2015). He determined that Ives noir, which has long been thought to be a natural hybrid between a wild Vitis labrusca species and an unknown Vitis vinifera variety is, in fact, far more likely to be a hybrid cultivar resulting from a crossing between wild native American species involving mainly V. labrusca and V. aestivalis, rather than V. vinifera.

Ives noir was widely established in the eastern United States by the end of Prohibition in the 1930s when the grape became popular with wineries making sweet fortified wines. However, by the end of the 20th century, plantings of the grape were declining significantly as the toll of air pollution in the United States resulted in crop failure for the sensitive vine.

== Viticulture ==
Ives noir is a mid-ripening variety that usually ripens after Concord. The vine is very sensitive to air pollution, ozone damage as well as sulphur-based sprays (such as the Bordeaux mixture used to combat powdery and downy mildew). When not grafted to more vigorous rootstock, Ives noir tend to produce a shallow and weak root system that also makes the vine very susceptible to water stress which may require irrigation in drought conditions.

== Wine regions ==
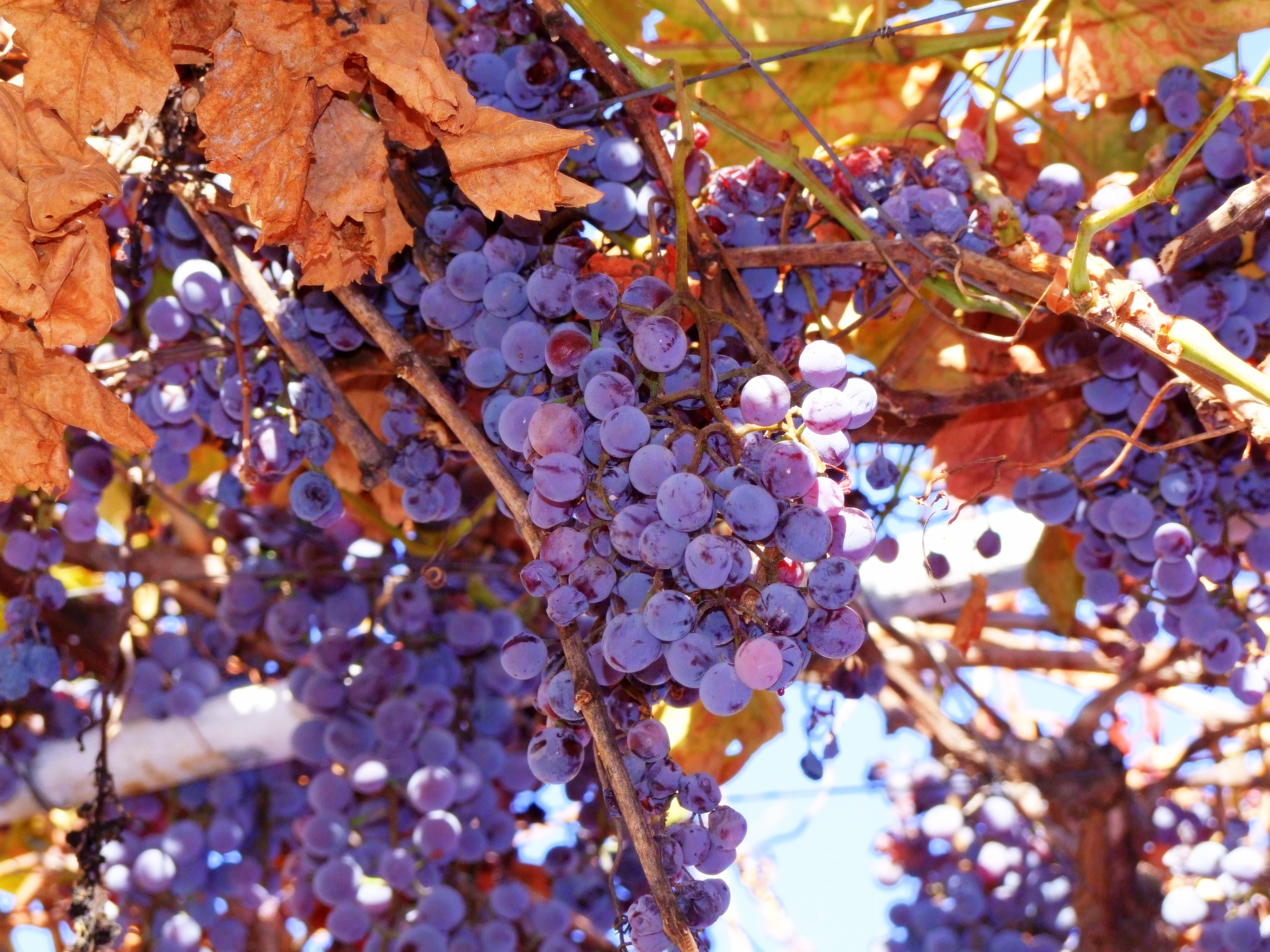
Ives noir shares many similarities to the Vitis labrusca grape variety Concord (pictured).

Today Ives noir is planted mostly in the Eastern United States and in the Southern States of Brazil where the variety is known as Bordô or Terci. Plantings in New York State were significantly impacted by downwind air pollution from Michigan and Ohio but as Clean Air Act standards enforced by the United States Environmental Protection Agency take effect, plantings of the variety have slowly started to recover with 50 acres (20 hectares) of Ives noir in production as of 1996.

Outside of New York there were 15 acres (6 hectares) of Ives noir in production in Arkansas, including some old vine plantings that were over 50 years old, as well as smaller plantings in New Jersey and Pennsylvania.

== Styles and uses ==
In addition to winemaking, Ives noir is also used in grape juice and jelly production. According to Master of Wine Jancis Robinson, the grape shares many similarities to Concord, including the characterized "foxy" note of Vitis labrusca grapes, but usually with a slightly lighter color. Ives noir is used as both a blending and varietal grape making wines from a range of sweetness styles from dry to semi-sweet blush wines and to sweet fortified wines.

== Synonyms ==
Over the years Ives noir has been known under a variety of synonyms including: Black Ives, Bordô or Terci (in Brazil), Ives Madeira, Ives' Madeira Seedling, Ives Seedling and Kittredge.
