= Chambourcin =

Variety of grape

- Grape (Vitis)
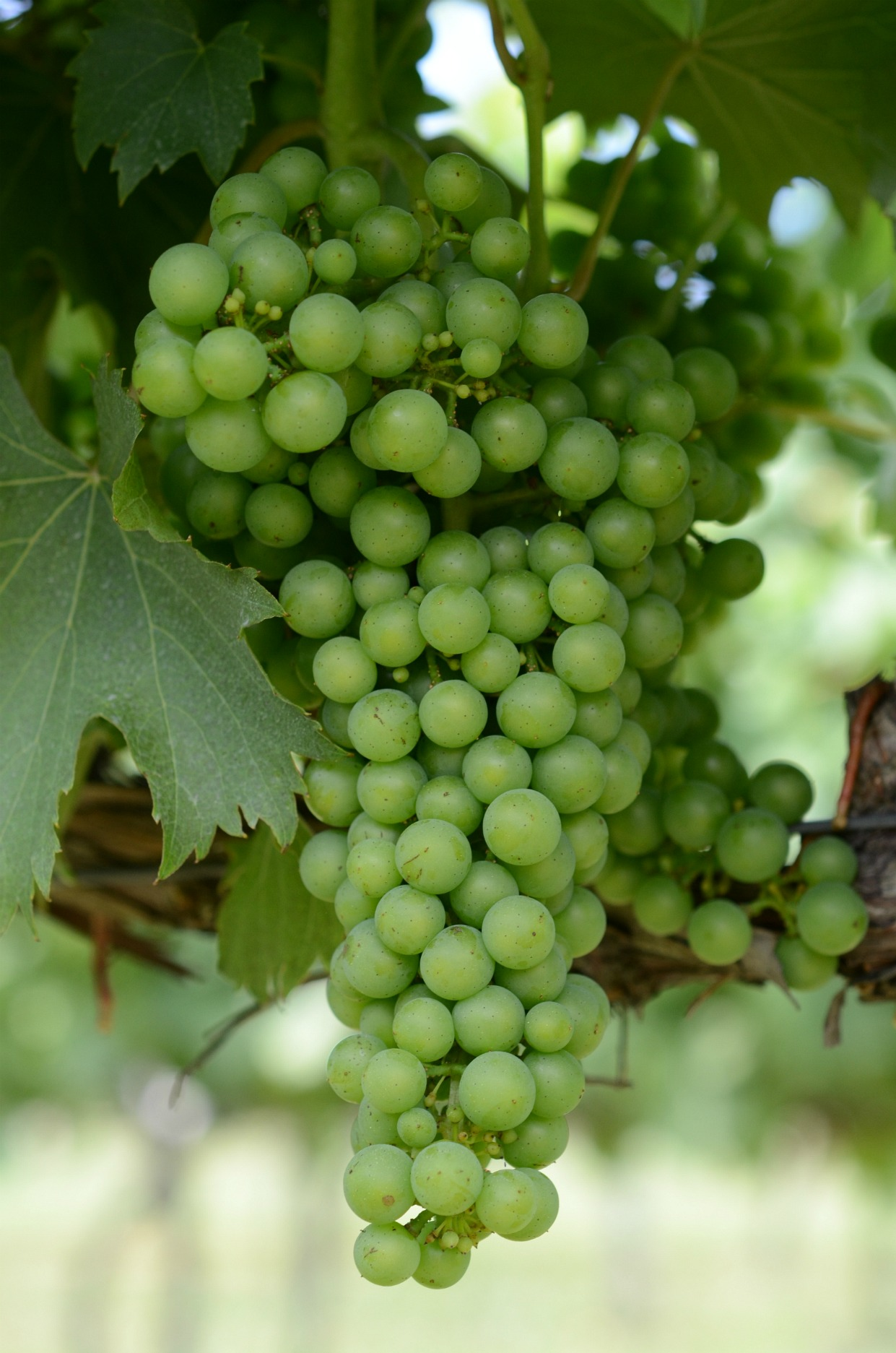
- Chambourcin grape before the color change of veraison.
- Color of berry skin: Red
- Species: Hybrid grape
- Origin: France, created by Joannes Seyve
- VIVC number: 2436

Chambourcin (French pronunciation: [ʃɑ̃buʁsɛ̃]) is a variety of grapevine belonging to the Vitis genus in the flowering plant family Vitaceae. It is a French-American interspecific hybrid grape variety used for making wine. Its parentage is uncertain, but genetic studies show it likely includes several North American Vitis species in its background including: V. berlandieri Planch., V. labrusca L., V. lincecumii Buckley, V. riparia Michx., V. rupestris Scheele, and V. vinifera. The hybrid was produced by Joannes Seyve who often used Seibel hybrids produced in the 1860s. The grape has only been available since 1963; it has a good resistance to fungal disease, and is one of the parents of the new disease resistant variety, Regent, which is increasing in popularity among German grape growers.

Chambourcin is considered a very productive grape with crop yields reported ranging from 11.1 tons per hectare to 17.3 tons per hectare in a study performed by Ohio State University.

== Chambourcin wine ==
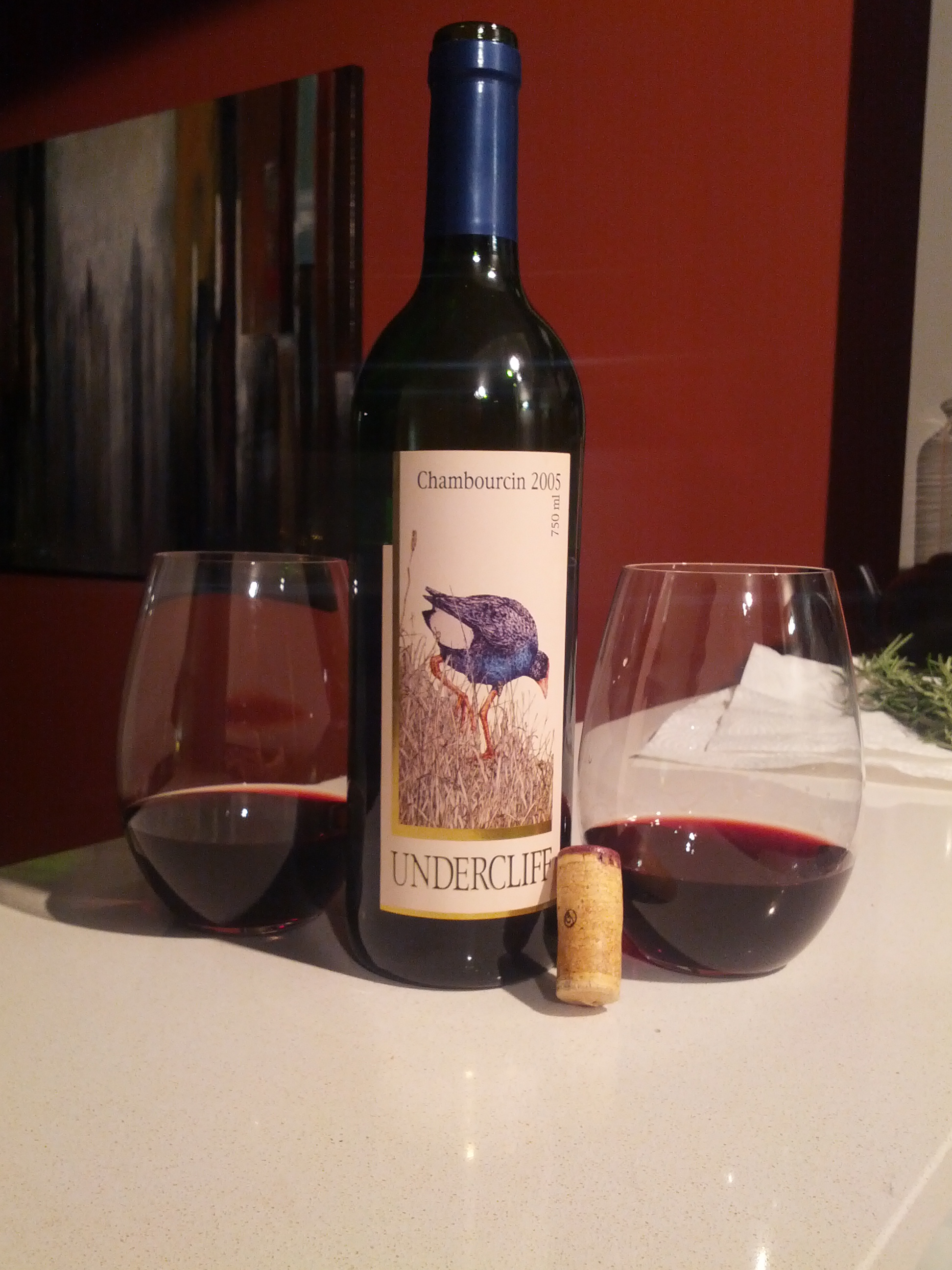
Chambourcin wine from the Hunter Valley wine region of Australia

The grape produces a deep-colored and aromatic wine. It can be made into a dry style or one with a moderate residual sugar level. Chambourcin is a teinturier, a grape whose juice is pink or red rather than clear like most red vitis vinifera cultivars.

The red juice fermented over the red skins can produce a very strongly flavoured wine. Most red wines are served at cellar temperature of 55 to 58 °F (13 to 14 °C) to bring out the flavour but some Chambourcin wines have such a strong flavour that it is recommended that they be served chilled.

=== Wine regions ===
Chambourcin has been planted widely in the mid-Atlantic region of North America, particularly in such states as New Jersey, New York, and Pennsylvania. It is also grown in Harrow and Ruthven, Ontario, and in Kelowna, B.C., Canada; several counties in Virginia; Frederick, Washington, Harford, Prince George's County, Maryland, Queen Anne's County, Calvert County, Maryland, and St. Mary's County, Maryland; Kent County, Delaware; Monroe County, Indiana; Daviess County, Kentucky; in the Ohio River Valley AVA Ohio; in the Lake Erie AVA of Ohio, New York, and Pennsylvania; Greenbrier, Calhoun, Roane, and Mineral counties in West Virginia; Allegan County, Michigan; the Shawnee Hills AVA of southern Illinois; the Yadkin Valley and Haw River Valley of North Carolina; Western Tennessee in the Mississippi Delta AVA; [[Missouri[Augusta AVA] Missouri]]; south-central Kansas; Norman Oklahoma; New Zealand's Northland Region; the Hunter Valley wine region of New South Wales and other warm, humid regions in Australia; also in France and Portugal.
