= New Jersey Farm Winery Act =

State legislation in 1981

The New Jersey Farm Winery Act was legislation passed by the New Jersey state legislature and signed by Governor Brendan Byrne in 1981. The Farm Winery Act was the first of several efforts by the New Jersey state legislature to relax Prohibition-era restrictions and craft new laws to facilitate the growth of the alcoholic beverage industry and provide new opportunities for winery licenses. Before it was enacted, New Jersey provided only one winery license for each million residents and licenses were practically impossible to obtain. By 1981, New Jersey boasted only seven wineries. By 1988, that number had doubled to 15. As of 2014, New Jersey currently has 48 licensed and operating wineries with several more prospective wineries in various stages of development. New Jersey wineries produce wine from more than 90 varieties of grapes, and from over 25 other fruits.

Assembly Bill A2240 was introduced by State Assemblywoman Barbara McConnell as proposed legislation in the New Jersey General Assembly on November 10, 1980. The bill would specifically address changes to two state statutes; the first a revision of state alcoholic beverage control and licensing laws to permit new wineries, and the second to reduce the per-gallon tax levy on wine produced. A2240 was passed by the General Assembly on March 2, 1981, and by the State Senate on June 25, 1981. Governor Brendan Byrne signed the bill into law, with its provisions effective immediately, on September 10, 1981.

According to Pinney, more than 450 new wineries in the United States opened between 1978 and 1985 with "much of the power behind that extraordinary growth certainly came from farm winery legislation. Several states enacted laws after the success of the California wine industry in the 1970s and buoyed by the results of the Judgment of Paris wine tasting in 1976 comparing French wines and wines produced in California.

== See also ==
- Alcohol laws of New Jersey
- Central Delaware Valley AVA
- Garden State Wine Growers Association
- Judgment of Princeton
- List of wineries, breweries, and distilleries in New Jersey
- New Jersey Division of Alcoholic Beverage Control
- New Jersey wine
- New Jersey Wine Industry Advisory Council
- Outer Coastal Plain AVA
- Warren Hills AVA
