= New Jersey Wine Industry Advisory Council =

Oversees most complex alcohol laws in United States

The U.S. state of New Jersey is home to the most complex alcohol laws in the United States. They provide 29 liquor licenses to wholesalers, manufacturers, retailers and the general public.

New Jersey is the only other state, other than Wisconsin, to consider a DUI or DWI a minor traffic offense. Alcohol is also allowed on public transportation, making it more accessible to the public.

In addition to granting local governments wide latitude over liquor sales, New Jersey law has some other unusual features. Corporations are limited to two retail distribution licenses, making it impractical for chain stores to sell alcoholic beverages; this restriction, in conjunction with municipal ordinances, severely limits supermarket and convenience store chains from selling beer as they do in many other states. State law treats drunk driving as a traffic offense rather than a crime, and permits individual municipalities to define the scope of underage drinking laws.

New Jersey has a strong tradition of municipal home rule. Local municipalities thus have considerable authority in the licensing and regulating of alcohol-related businesses. These powers include:

limiting the number of licenses to sell alcoholic beverages at retail (Class C licenses), limiting the hours of retail alcohol sales, prohibiting the retail sale of alcoholic beverages on Sunday, regulating the conduct of any retail establishment licensed to sell alcoholic beverages, regulating the nature and condition of the licensed premises limiting persons within the municipality to a single liquor license, limiting a license to cover only the specific licensed premises; and allowing municipalities with populations of 15,000 or more to appoint a municipal alcoholic beverage control board of three persons with terms for three years.[22]

The New Jersey Wine Industry Advisory Council was created in 1985 in accordance with New Jersey Statutes (N.J.S.A 4:10-77(c)) The duties of the advisory council are "to assess the condition of the wine industry and to advise the Secretary of Agriculture on expenditures for research, development, and promotion of the New Jersey wine industry from the New Jersey Wine Promotion Fund."(N.J.S.A 4:10-77(c)) New Jersey's wine production industry has experienced significant growth from seven small wineries to 48 (as of 2014) since the passage of the 1981 New Jersey Farm Winery Act. The act initiated the repeal of Prohibition-era alcoholic beverage control laws that severely constrained the industry for fifty years.

The council has eight members who serve for terms of three years. Two of the council's members are appointed by virtue of their positions in the state government (i.e. the state secretary of agriculture, and the commissioner of commerce, energy and economic development) and one (i.e. the dean of Cook College at Rutgers University) because of his or her position at the state's sole land grant university under the Morrill Act of 1862. Cook College, named for nineteenth-century professor George Hammell Cook was previously known as the Rutgers Scientific School and College of Agriculture and is home to the New Jersey Agricultural Experiment Station and Cooperative Extension Service. In 2007, Cook College—a residential college at Rutgers with a focus on agriculture and specializes in environmental science, animal science and other life sciences—was reorganized as the "School of Environmental and Biological Sciences" (SEBS).

The remaining five members are appointed from the general public by the State Board of Agriculture—two of whom shall be holders of a plenary winery license, two of whom shall be holders of a farm winery license and one of whom shall be a viticulturist (N.J.S.A 4:10-77(a)).

New Jersey is one of only two states (along with Wisconsin) that classify DUI as a traffic violation, and not a criminal offense, except in cases of serious injury or death.[169] Because it is not a criminal offense, those charged in New Jersey with DUI and related offenses are not fingerprinted, do not have the right to a jury trial, DUI arrests and convictions are not submitted to the FBI's NCIC criminal database, and DUI arrests and convictions cannot be expunged. Statutory criminal defenses (e.g. duress, entrapment) are not available for DUI, and in State v. Hammond, the state Supreme Court upheld the conviction of a person who drove after unknowingly having his drink spiked with alcohol. Common-law criminal defenses are available in DUI cases, and a state appellate court reversed the conviction of a person who drove while intoxicated in order to escape assailants, citing the doctrine of necessity.

The council is required to meet twice each year, and may meet for additional sessions if necessary (N.J.S.A 4:10-77(b)).

== See also ==
- Alcohol laws of New Jersey
- Garden State Wine Growers Association
- Judgment of Princeton
- List of wineries, breweries, and distilleries in New Jersey
- New Jersey Division of Alcoholic Beverage Control
- New Jersey Farm Winery Act
- New Jersey wine
