= Nu Mine, Pennsylvania =

Unincorporated community in Pennsylvania, US

- Unincorporated community
- Location within Pennsylvania
- Coordinates: 40°47′46″N 79°16′59″W
- Country: United States
- State: Pennsylvania
- County: Armstrong
- Township: Cowanshannock
- Elevation: 1,142 ft (348 m)
- Time zone: UTC-5 (Eastern (EST))
  - Summer (DST): UTC-4 (EDT)
- ZIP code: 16244
- Area code: 724
- GNIS feature ID: 1182708

Nu Mine (also known as NuMine) is an unincorporated community in Cowanshannock Township, Armstrong County, Pennsylvania, United States. The community is located along Pennsylvania Route 85, 1.6 miles (2.6 km) east of Rural Valley. Nu Mine has a post office, with ZIP code 16244.

== History ==
Nu Mine was one of 17 company towns sold in 1947: McIntyre, Coal Run, Iselin, Waterman, Lucernemines, Aultman, Ernest, Tidesdale, Coy, Luciusboro, Fulton Run, Nu Mine, Yatesboro, Margaret, Helvetia, Twin Rocks, and Yatesboro Lots.
