= Yatesboro, Pennsylvania =

Unincorporated community in Pennsylvania, US

- Unincorporated community
- Location within Pennsylvania
- Coordinates: 40°48′00″N 79°20′03″W
- Country: United States
- State: Pennsylvania
- County: Armstrong
- Township: Valley
- Elevation: 1,132 ft (345 m)
- Time zone: UTC-5 (Eastern (EST))
  - Summer (DST): UTC-4 (EDT)
- ZIP Code: 16263
- GNIS feature ID: 1191863

Yatesboro is an unincorporated community that is located in Cowanshannock Township, Pennsylvania. The community is situated 1.0 mile (1.6 km) west of Rural Valley.

Yatesboro has a post office with ZIP Code 16263.

== History ==
Yatesboro was founded as a company town c. 1900. It was built on farmland by the Rochester and Pittsburgh Coal and Iron Company.

It was one of seventeen company towns that were sold in 1947, including McIntyre, Coal Run, Iselin, Waterman, Lucernemines, Aultman, Ernest, Tidesdale, Coy, Luciusboro, Fulton Run, Nu Mines, Yatesboro, Margaret, Helvetia, Twin Rocks, and Yatesboro Lots.

== Geography ==
The elevation of Yatesboro is 1,132 feet (345 m). Yatesboro appears on the Rural Valley U.S. Geological Survey Map.

Armstrong County is located in the Eastern Time Zone (UTC–5).

== Demographics ==
Historical population
Census	Pop.	Note	%±

The United States Census Bureau defined Yatesboro as a census designated place (CDP) in 2023.
