= Alcohol laws of New Jersey =

The location of New Jersey within the United States

The state laws governing alcoholic beverages in New Jersey are among the most complex in the United States, with many peculiarities not found in other states' laws. They provide for 29 distinct liquor licenses granted to manufacturers, wholesalers, retailers, and for the public warehousing and transport of alcoholic drinks. General authority for the statutory and regulatory control of alcoholic drinks rests with the state government, particularly the Division of Alcoholic Beverage Control overseen by the state's Attorney General.

Under home rule, New Jersey law grants individual municipalities substantial discretion in passing ordinances regulating the sale and consumption of alcoholic drinks within their limits. The number of retail licenses available is determined by a municipality's population, and may be further limited by the town's governing body. As a result, the availability of alcohol and regulations governing it vary significantly from town to town. A small percentage of municipalities in the state are "dry towns" that do not allow alcoholic drinks to be sold, and do not issue retail licenses for bars or restaurants to serve alcohol to patrons. Other towns permit alcohol sales 24 hours a day. Retail licenses tend to be difficult to obtain, and when available are subject to exorbitant prices and fervent competition.

In addition to granting local governments wide latitude over liquor sales, New Jersey law has some other unusual features. Corporations are limited to two retail distribution licenses, making it impractical for chain stores to sell alcoholic drinks; this restriction, in conjunction with municipal ordinances, severely limits supermarket and convenience store chains from selling beer as they do in many other states. State law treats drunk driving as a traffic offense rather than a crime, and permits individual municipalities to define the scope of underage drinking laws.

== History ==
New Jersey's history of taverns and alcohol production dates to its early colonial period. Colonial winemakers received recognition by the Royal Society of Arts for producing high-quality wine, and a local distillery owner was asked by George Washington for his recipe for "cyder spirits" (applejack). Throughout the 19th and early 20th centuries, the industry developed with the influx of European immigrants, specifically Germans and Italians, who presented a sizable market for alcoholic drinks and brought with them old world winemaking, brewing, and distilling techniques. With the rise of the temperance movement culminating in Prohibition (1919–1933), New Jersey's alcohol industry suffered; many breweries, wineries, and distilleries either closed or relocated to other states. The legacy of Prohibition restricted and prevented the industry's recovery until the state legislature began loosening restrictions and repealing Prohibition-era laws starting in 1981. To this day, New Jersey's alcohol industry and regulations are still lagging behind other modern states despite recently enacted laws.

== Controlling authority ==
=== Statewide statutes and enforcement ===
New Jersey's laws and regulations regarding alcohol are overseen by the Department of Law and Public Safety's Division of Alcoholic Beverage Control (ABC), which is managed by the state's Attorney General. The current director of the Alcohol Beverage Control division is Dave Rible. State and municipal laws, including those that regulate alcoholic drinks, apply in all territorial waters which includes inland rivers, lakes, and bays, and tidal waters up to three nautical miles from the New Jersey shoreline.

Starting in 1738, towns in New Jersey began issuing liquor licenses to tavern keepers. Before federal Prohibition in 1919, despite many state liquor statutes, the regulation of alcoholic drinks in New Jersey was almost exclusively local, with wide variations among municipalities. In 1933, after the repeal of Prohibition, the states were again permitted to regulate alcoholic drinks. Immediately upon the end of Prohibition in 1933, New Jersey instituted the Alcoholic Beverage Control Law, which established and granted rulemaking powers to the Division of Alcoholic Beverage Control. The law also established a three-tier alcohol distribution system whereby, with minor exceptions, alcohol manufacturers may only sell to wholesalers, who may only sell to retailers, who may only sell to customers.

New Jersey's alcohol laws and regulations are codified in Title 33 of the New Jersey Statutes, and Title 13, Chapter 2 of the New Jersey Administrative Code respectively. After New Jersey's current state constitution was adopted in 1947 and some departments were consolidated, the department was incorporated into the Department of Law and Public Safety under the New Jersey Attorney General's office. The statutes define an alcoholic drink as "any fluid or solid capable of being converted into a fluid, suitable for human consumption, and having an alcohol content of more than one-half of one per centum (1/2 of 1%) by volume, including alcohol, beer, lager beer, ale, porter, naturally fermented wine, treated wine, blended wine, fortified wine, sparkling wine, distilled liquors, blended distilled liquors and any brewed, fermented or distilled liquors fit for use for drink purposes or any mixture of the same, and fruit juices."

=== Municipal control ===
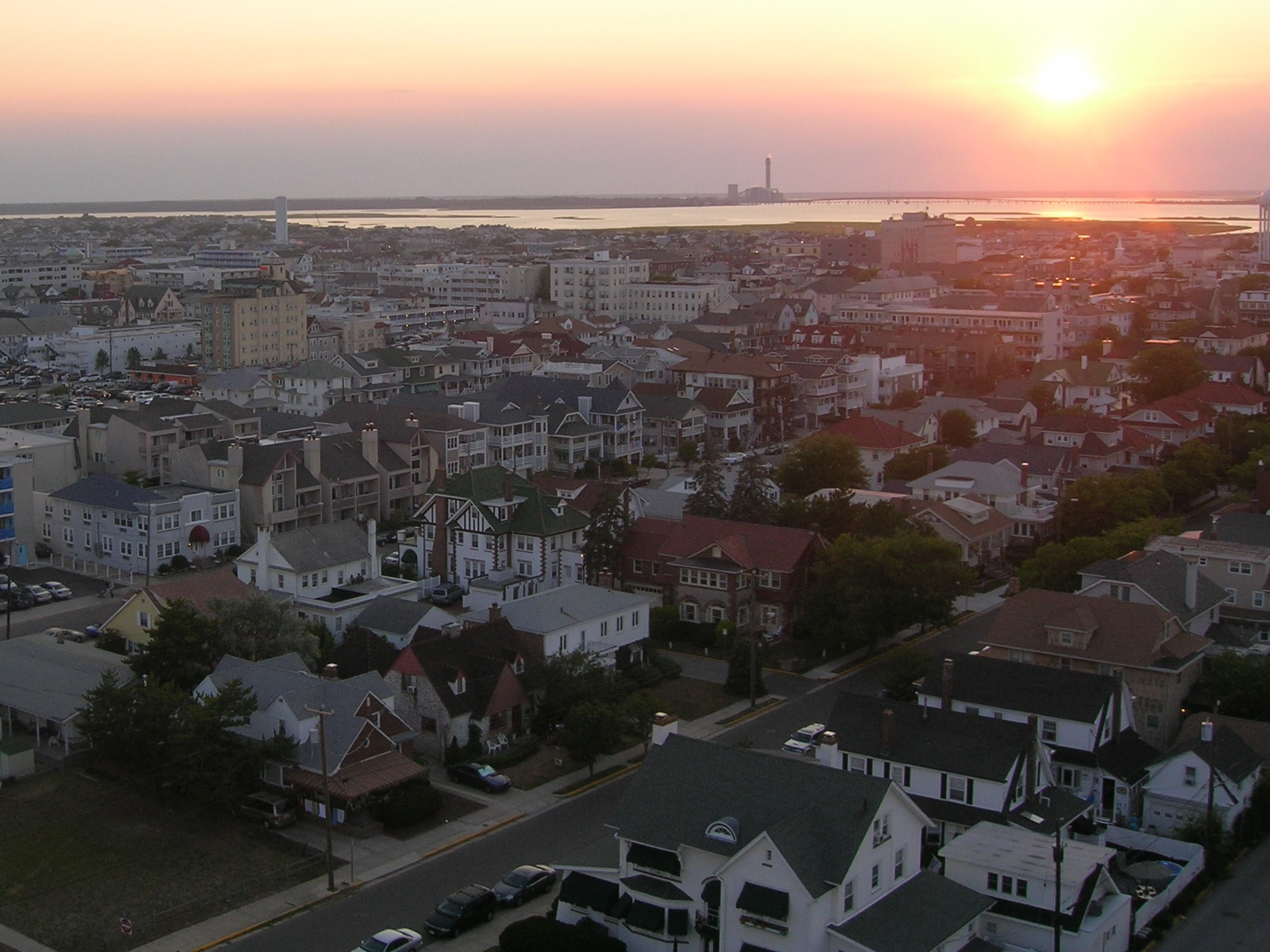
Ocean City was founded in 1879 as a dry town, and it never has issued a liquor license, forbids the sale of alcohol, and prohibits BYOB at restaurants.

New Jersey has a strong tradition of municipal home rule. Local municipalities thus have considerable authority in the licensing and regulating of alcohol-related businesses. These powers include:

- limiting the number of licenses to sell alcoholic beverages at retail (Class C licenses),
- limiting the hours of retail alcohol sales,
- prohibiting the retail sale of alcoholic beverages on Sunday,
- regulating the conduct of any retail establishment licensed to sell alcoholic beverages,
- regulating the nature and condition of the licensed premises
- limiting persons within the municipality to a single liquor license,
- limiting a license to cover only the specific licensed premises; and
- allowing municipalities with populations of 15,000 or more to appoint a municipal alcoholic beverage control board of three persons with terms for three years.

Retail licenses for consumption or distribution are allocated proportionally to a municipality's population. Licenses permitting on-premises retail sale and consumption of alcoholic beverages (i.e. bars and restaurants) are allocated at a ratio of one license for 3,000 residents. Distribution licenses are available at a ratio of one license per 7,500 residents. Small towns with populations less than 1,000 can issue at least one consumption and one distribution license. Given the regulatory latitude allowed municipalities, the actual number of licenses extant in a municipality may more or less depend on a variety of factors, including:

- whether the municipality's existing licenses were grandfathered by predating the 1948 imposition of statutory limits on the number of retail licenses per town,
- whether the town has decided to offer fewer licenses, and
- whether the municipality has decided by ordinance or referendum to become dry, and prohibit the sale of alcoholic beverages within its limits.

Because the law grants a municipality significant regulatory latitude, 35 of the state's 565 municipalities are currently dry. Conversely, because of the grandfathering of licenses, several municipalities have a substantially higher ratio of licenses. For instance, the resort town of Wildwood has a permanent population of 5,300, but 61 active liquor licenses.

=== Other authorities ===
Casinos in Atlantic City and federal enclaves (e.g. military bases, national parks) are not under the jurisdiction of either the Division of Alcoholic Beverage Control or municipal alcoholic beverage control boards. The New Jersey Division of Gaming Enforcement and the New Jersey Casino Control Commission are responsible for the regulation of alcoholic beverages at casinos. Per Article I, Section 8, Clause 17 of the United States Constitution, the federal government may "exercise like authority over all places purchased by the consent of the legislature of the state in which the same shall be, for the erection of forts, magazines, arsenals, dockyards, and other needful buildings." While some state laws do apply in federal enclaves, court decisions have exempted military bases and other federal lands from state and local alcohol laws.

== Liquor licenses and permits ==
New Jersey law provides for 29 distinct liquor licenses divided into the following five classes: Class A for manufacturers, Class B for wholesalers, Class C for retailers, Class D for transportation licenses, and Class E for public warehouses. State law allows the Division of Alcoholic Beverage Control to create temporary permits "to provide for contingencies where it would be appropriate and consonant with the spirit of this chapter to issue a license, but the contingency has not been expressly provided for." Special permits are allowed to range in price from $10 to $2000, are limited to 25 days per year for a given premises, and currently there are three types of permits for non-licensees. Excluding seasonal licenses and special permits, ABC licenses are issued for one year starting on July 1, and ending on June 30.

=== Class A manufacturer's licenses ===
Type of license	Activity permitted	Fee for license (As of 2019)
Plenary Brewery License (1a)	to brew any malt alcoholic beverage; to sell to wholesalers and at festivals in the state; to sell and distribute out of state; to maintain a warehouse	Base license: $10,625
Limited Brewery License (1b)	to brew any malt beverage, not in excess of 300,000 barrels (31-gallon barrels) per year; to sell to wholesalers and at festivals in the state; to sell and distribute out of state; as part of a tour, sell beer for on-site consumption; to offer samples to visitors; to sell up to 15.5 gallons of beer (i.e. a keg) for consumption off-premises; sale of food is absolutely prohibited; to maintain a warehouse	Base license: $1,250 for up to 50,000 barrels; $2,500 for 50,000–100,000 barrels; $5,000 for 100,000–200,000 barrels; $7,500 for 200,000–300,000 barrels
Restricted Brewery License (1c)	to brew any malt beverage, not in excess of 10,000 barrels per year; only for businesses with a Plenary Retail Consumption License and a dining facility; limit of 10 licenses to be held by a person; to offer samples at off-premises charitable or civic events; to sell on-premises, to wholesalers, and at festivals in the state	Base license: $1,000 for first 1,000 barrels; $250 for each additional 1,000 barrels
Plenary Winery License (2a)	3 acres minimum required; to produce any fermented wines, blend, fortify or treat wines; to sell to wholesalers, directly to retailers, at festivals, or to churches (for religious purposes) in the state; to sell and distribute outside the state; to offer samples to visitors; to sell to consumers on the winery premises; to operate 15 off-premises sales rooms; to direct ship up to 12 cases per year to consumers in or out of state; to maintain a warehouse	Base license: $938; Each offsite salesroom: $250; To sell to retailers: $100 for up to 50,000 gallons per year; $250 for 50,000–100,000 gallons; $500 for 100,000–150,000 gallons; $1,000 for 150,000–250,000 gallons
Farm Winery License (2b)	3 acres minimum required; to produce up to 50,000 gallons of wine per year; requires that a minimum of 51% of grapes or fruit used in production be grown in New Jersey for the first 5 years, and a minimum of 75% thereafter; to sell to wholesalers, directly to retailers, at festivals, or to churches (for religious purposes) in the state; to sell and distribute outside the state; to offer samples to visitors; to sell to consumers on the winery premises; to operate 15 off-premises sales rooms; to direct ship up to 12 cases per year to consumers in or out of state; to maintain a warehouse	Base license: $63 for less than 1,000 gallons per year; $125 for 1,000–2,500 gallons; $250 for 2,500–30,000 gallons; $375 for 30,000–50,000 gallons; Each offsite salesroom: $250; To sell to retailers: $100
Wine Blending License (2c)	to blend, treat, mix, or bottle wines; to sell to wholesalers in the state; to sell and distribute outside the state; to maintain a warehouse	Base license: $625
Instructional Winemaking Facility License (2d)	to instruct consumers in winemaking with the opportunity to participate directly in winemaking; to maintain a warehouse	Base license: $1,000
Out-of-State Winery License (2e)	requires a valid winery license in another U.S. state; requires that winery no more than 250,000 gallons produced per year; right to sell and distribute in New Jersey; to operate up to 16 off-site salesrooms; right to ship up to 12 cases per year to consumers in or out of state; right to sell directly to New Jersey retailers	Base license: $938; Each salesroom: $250; To sell to retailers: $100 for up to 50,000 gallons per year; $250 for 50,000–100,000 gallons; $500 for 100,000–150,000 gallons; $1,000 for 150,000–250,000 gallons
Cidery and Meadery License (2f)	to produce up to 50,000 barrels of cider per year; to produce up to 250,000 gallons of mead per year; to sell to wholesalers, directly to retailers, and at festivals in the state; to sell and distribute outside the state; to offer samples to visitors; to offer or sell snacks to visitors, but not to operate a restaurant; to sell to consumers on the premises; to direct ship up to 12 cases of mead per year to consumers in or out of state; cider, like beer, may not be directly shipped to consumers in or out of state; to maintain a warehouse	Base license: $938
Plenary Distillery License (3a)	to manufacture any distilled alcoholic beverages; to rectify, blend, treat, or mix distilled alcoholic beverages; to sell to wholesalers in the state; to sell and distribute outside the state; to maintain a warehouse	Base license: $12,500
Limited Distillery License (3b)	manufacture alcoholic beverages made from fruit juices; to blend, treat, mix, compound with wine, and add sweetenings and flavors to make cordials and liqueurs; to sell to wholesalers in the state; to sell and distribute outside the state; to maintain a warehouse	Base license: $3,750
Supplementary Limited Distillery License (3c)	to bottle and rebottle alcoholic beverages distilled from fruit juices; to sell to wholesalers in the state; to sell and distribute outside the state; to maintain a warehouse	Base license: $313 per year for up to 5,000 gallons; $625 per year for 5,000–10,000 gallons; $1,250 without capacity limit
Craft Distillery License (3e)	to manufacture up to 20,000 gallons per year of any distilled alcoholic beverages; requires that a minimum of 51% of raw materials be grown or produced in New Jersey; to rectify, blend, treat, or mix distilled alcoholic beverages; to sell to wholesalers in the state; to sell and distribute outside the state; to maintain a warehouse; as part of a tour, sell distilled alcoholic beverages for on-site consumption; to offer samples to visitors; sell up to 5 liters of distilled alcoholic beverages for consumption off-premises; sale of food is absolutely prohibited	Base license: $938
Rectifier and Blender License (4)	to rectify, blend, treat, and mix distilled alcoholic beverages; to fortify, blend, and treat fermented alcoholic beverages; to sell to wholesalers in the state; to sell and distribute outside the state; to maintain a warehouse	Base license: $7,500
Bonded Warehouse Bottling License (5)	to maintain a bonded warehouse pursuant to the Internal Revenue Code	Base license: $625

=== Class B wholesaler's licenses ===
Type of license	Activity permitted	Fee for license (As of 2019)
Plenary Wholesale License (1)	to sell and distribute alcoholic beverages to retailers and wholesalers in the state; to sell and distribute out of state; to maintain a warehouse and salesroom	$8,750
Limited Wholesale License (2a)	to sell and distribute brewed malt alcoholic beverages and naturally fermented wines to retailers and wholesalers in the state; to sell and distribute out of state; to maintain a warehouse and salesroom	$1,875
Wine Wholesale License (2b)	to sell and distribute any naturally fermented, treated, blended, fortified and sparkling wines to retailers and wholesalers in the state; to sell and distribute out of state; to maintain a warehouse and salesroom	$3,750
State Beverage Distributor's License (2c)	to sell and distribute unchilled, brewed malt alcoholic beverages in original containers only, in quantities of at least 144 fluid ounces, to retailers or directly to customers; to sell and distribute chilled draught malt alcoholic beverages in kegs, barrels or other similar containers of at least one fluid gallon, to retailers or directly to customers; to sell and distribute out of State; to maintain a warehouse and salesroom; maximum of 72 may be issued in the state	$1,031

=== Class C retailer's licenses ===
Type of license	Activity permitted	Fee for license (as of 2013)
Plenary Retail Consumption License	to sell alcoholic beverages in open containers, and sell package goods on a limited basis; package goods may only be displayed for sale on the premises' perimeter walls or behind the bar; premises cannot be a grocery, delicatessen, drug store or mercantile business; permitted to hold tastings and tasting dinners; licensee can obtain up to two Restricted Brewery Licenses; may sell at off-premises events in open containers with Catering Permit (up to 25 times per year); number of licenses per municipality is restricted	fee set by municipality: $250–$2500 $100 per day for Catering Permit
Plenary Retail Consumption License with Broad Package Privilege (Broad C License)	same rights and limitations as a Plenary Retail Consumption License, except the sale of package goods is not restricted; license is no longer being issued but an existing one may be renewed or transferred; number of licenses per municipality is restricted	fee set by municipality: $250–$2500 $100 per day for Catering Permit
Hotel/Motel License	for hotels or motels containing at least 100 guest sleeping rooms; same rights and limitations as a Plenary Retail Consumption License; number of licenses per municipality is not restricted	fee set by municipality: $250–$2500 $100 per day for Catering Permit
Plenary Retail Consumption License (Theater Exception)	for non-profit musical or theatrical performances; must have seating capacity of 1,000 persons or more; alcoholic beverages must be sold in open containers; consumption of alcoholic beverages only during performance, and 2 hours before and after; number of licenses per municipality is not restricted	fee set by municipality: $250–$2500
Seasonal Retail Consumption License	to sell alcoholic beverages from either May 1 to November 14 or from November 15 to April 30; same rights and limitations as a Plenary Retail Consumption License, but only for 6 months per year; number of licenses per municipality is restricted	fee set by municipality: 75% of the fees for a Plenary Retail Consumption License $100 per day for Catering Permit
Plenary Retail Distribution License	to sell alcoholic beverages in sealed containers for consumption off-premises; permitted to hold tastings; number of licenses per municipality is restricted	fee set by municipality: $125–$2,500
Limited Retail Distribution License	to sell any unchilled, brewed malt alcoholic beverages in sealed containers for consumption off-premises; for use in a grocery store, meat market, or delicatessen; license is no longer being issued but an existing one may be renewed or transferred; number of licenses per municipality is not restricted	fees set by municipality: $31–$63
Plenary Retail Transit License	to sell any alcoholic beverage for consumption only on trains, airplanes, limousines and boats while in transit; number of licenses per municipality is not restricted	$375 for train or air transport $31 for vehicle for limousines $63 for boats up to 65 feet in length $125 for boats 65–110 feet in length $375 on boats more than 110 feet in length
Club License	issued only to non-profit organizations; group must have at least 60 voting members and have possessed a clubhouse for at least 3 years, or be a chapter of a state or national organization; only for sale of alcoholic beverages to be consumed on premises to bona fide club members and their guests; prohibited from selling package goods; prohibited from selling alcohol beverages to groups which rent their facilities; number of licenses per municipality is not restricted	fee set by municipality: $63–$188

=== Class D transportation licenses ===
Type of license	Activity permitted	Fee for license (as of 2013)
Transportation License	to transport alcoholic beverages into, out of, through and within the state of New Jersey; to maintain a warehouse	$625.

=== Class E public warehouse licenses ===
Type of license	Activity permitted	Fee for license (as of 2013)
Public Warehouse License	to receive, store and warehouse, alcoholic beverages in a licensed public warehouse; does not authorize any transportation of said beverages	$500.
Broker's License	to act as a broker (for a fee or commission) in the purchase and sale of alcoholic beverages, on behalf of manufacturers and wholesalers in the state or out of the state.; cannot warehouse or purchase alcohol beverages in his or her own name; cannot sell to wholesalers or retailers in the state	$500

=== Special permits ===
Type of permit	Activity permitted	Fee for permit (as of 2013)
Social Affair Permit	only for events run by non-profit organizations; alcoholic beverages must be sold in open containers; permitted to hold tastings and tasting dinners; limit of 12 one-day permits per year per organization; limit of 25 one-day permits per year per location; must have approval of the municipal police chief, and the clerk of the municipal alcoholic beverage control board	$100 per day for civic, religious, and educational organizations $150 per day for other non-profit organizations
Special Permit for a Golf Facility	designed for golf courses which are neither country clubs nor government-owned; golf course must have 18 holes, and be at least 5000 linear yards (i.e. not a driving range or miniature golf course); alcoholic beverages must be sold in open containers; alcohol may only be served during golf-related events	$2000
Special Concessionaire Permit	for the sale of alcoholic beverages in facilities owned by the state, a county, or a municipality; alcoholic beverages must be consumed on-site; permitted to hold tastings and tasting dinners; may sell at off-premises events in open containers with Special Event Permit (up to 25 times per year)	$2000 $100 per day for Special Event Permit

== Municipal issues ==
=== Availability of retail liquor licenses ===
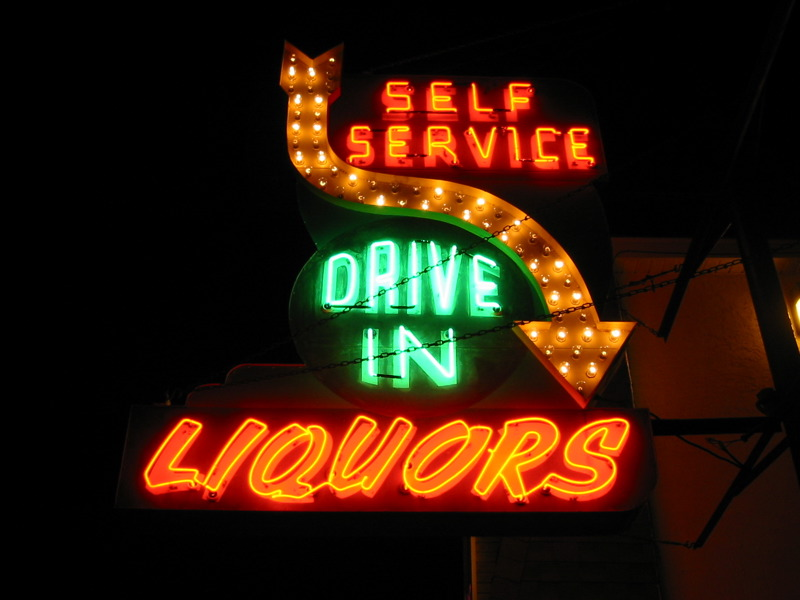
A sign lights up a liquor store in Wildwood, which has more than 60 active liquor licenses.

The number of Class C retail licenses for bars, restaurants, and liquor stores is limited by population and often by municipal ordinances. Licenses are typically obtained from existing licensees who choose to sell, or when a new license is offered as a town's population grows. As a result, the price for a retail license is often prohibitively expensive. The sale of a new license is usually conducted by public auction. The intense competition can benefit a town by generating several hundred thousand dollars of revenue from the highest bidder. A 2006 license auction in Cherry Hill, New Jersey set the state record at $1.5 million.

Supermarkets, convenience stores, and gas stations in New Jersey rarely sell alcoholic beverages because state law prohibits any person or corporation from possessing more than two retail distribution licenses. While licenses for bars, restaurants and liquor stores are limited, other retail licenses are not. Class C licenses can be granted without limit for common carriers (such as limousines and boats), private clubs with a minimum of 60 members, hotels with at least 100 rooms, and theatres with at least 1,000 seats.

Special permits exist to allow for the sale of alcoholic beverages at golf courses, government-owned facilities, and at social events run by non-profit organizations (for example, church carnivals). A restaurant in New Jersey without a liquor license can sell wine from a New Jersey winery by becoming an offsite retail sales outlet of the winery. Since the early 1990s, there have been a handful of unsuccessful proposals to create a separate restaurant license allowing eating establishments to sell beer and wine. Such proposals have been strongly opposed by current retail license holders who believe that it would decrease their income, and thus the value of their liquor license.

=== Dry towns ===
Some municipalities, particularly in South Jersey, are dry towns where no alcohol can be legally served or sold. Some of them are dry because of their origins as Quaker, Methodist, or other Protestant religious communities. For example, the seaside resort town of Ocean City has been dry since it was founded in 1879 by four Methodist clergymen. In recent years, several municipalities have questioned whether they ought to remain dry. Dry towns frequently have public referendums on whether they should remain dry or allow liquor sales in order to attract new businesses and increase property tax revenue.

Dry towns in New Jersey cannot forbid the possession, consumption, or transportation of alcohol, but have the option to permit or prohibit BYOB at restaurants and social affair permits for non-profit organizations. In 2012, Ocean City residents rejected a proposal to allow restaurant patrons to bring their own wine or beer to unlicensed establishments. It is possible for a dry town to have a winery or brewery that offers tastings, since alcohol manufacturing licenses in New Jersey are issued by the state, and are not regulated by municipalities. As of 2013, there are 35 dry municipalities in New Jersey, down from 44 in 2002.

Some dry towns permit the sale of alcohol if it is produced on site.

=== Hours of operation and other licensing regulations ===
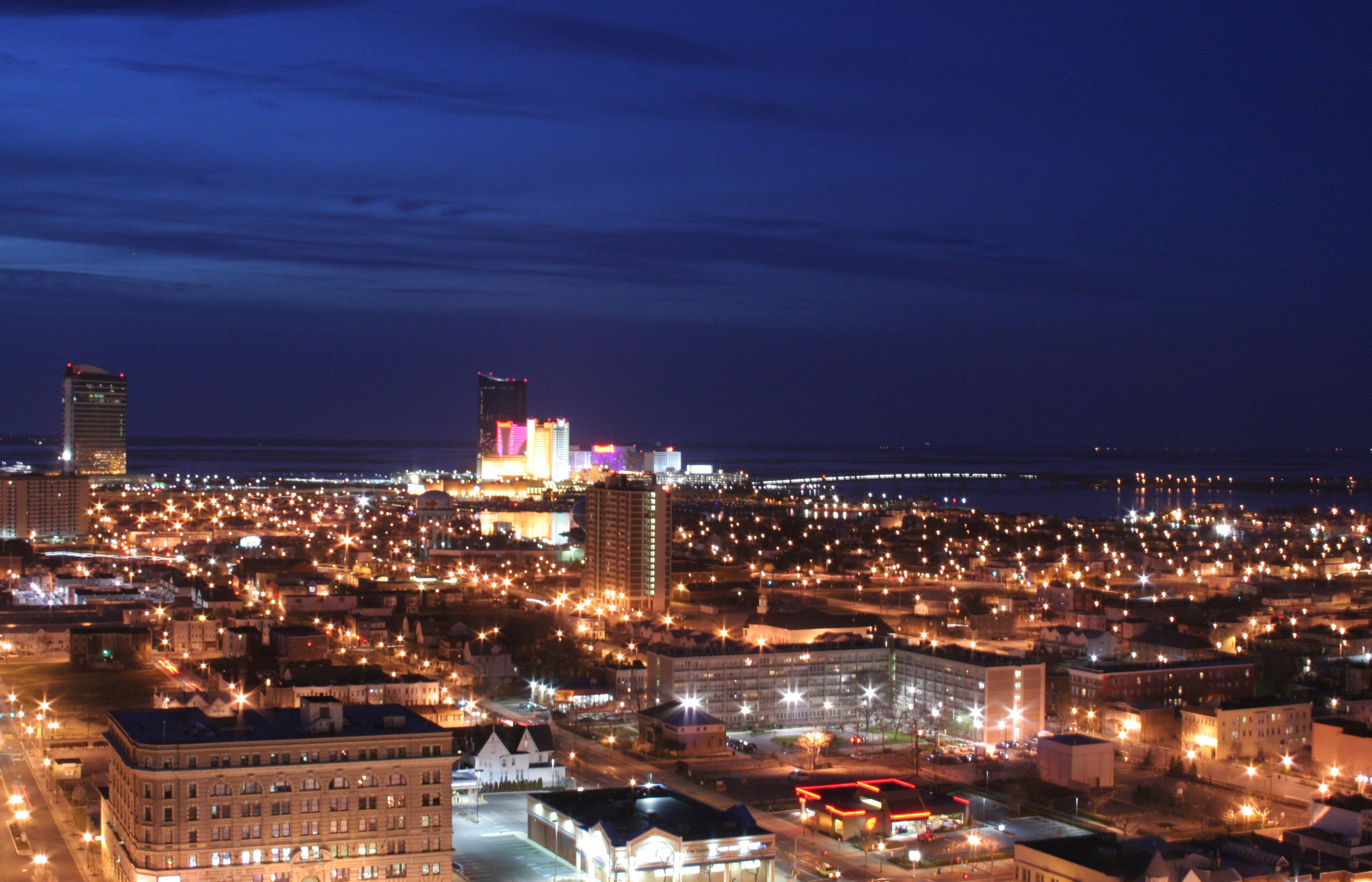
Atlantic City is one of the few municipalities in New Jersey that allow the sale of alcohol 24 hours per day.

The hours of sale for on-premises consumption are regulated by local ordinance, and closing times vary by town. Atlantic City does not have closing hours, and alcohol can be purchased at its casinos and local bars 24 hours a day. With the exception of Newark and Jersey City, the law forbids hard liquor packaged goods sales before 9 am and after 10 pm any day of the week. This can be restricted further by local ordinance. Liquor stores may sell beer and wine during any hours that on-premises sales are allowed.

New Jersey regulations for liquor stores and bars are extensive. Licensed establishments may not offer nudity. It is illegal to sell liquor below cost, charge a flat fee for unlimited drinks (except for private parties and on New Year's Eve), offer any promotion that is contingent on drinking a certain amount of alcohol, allow patrons to remain after closing time, or sell liquor at a drive-through window. Bars and clubs are prohibited from having a 'ladies' night' or any pricing which is regarded as discriminatory. Police officers are prohibited from working for licensed businesses in the same town where they are employed, and some municipalities require fingerprinting for all liquor store and bar employees.

Gambling and related paraphernalia, broadly defined by ABC to include claw and crane machines, casino-themed video games, football pools, and door prizes, irrespective of whether any profit is being made by the business, are prohibited at licensed establishments. The only exceptions are for those bars licensed by the state to sell lottery tickets, have off-track betting on horse racing, or offer sports betting on land within the oval of a former horse racetrack. Charity bingo games or raffles are also allowed. Card games, darts, billiards and other games are permitted as long as no money is exchanged, and no prizes are given.

ABC regulations permit a bar owner or employee to give away a free drink as long as it is not advertised. Businesses may issue free or complimentary drink coupons (up to one per day per patron). Hotel and motel licensees may also give guests complimentary bottles of wine on special occasions. Licensed establishments are permitted to institute dress codes, cover charges, and minimum age restrictions. Liquor stores are allowed to conduct tastings of beer, wine, and spirits. Bars, restaurants, state concessionaires (e.g. PNC Bank Arts Center), and non-profit organizations with a special permit can host both tastings and tasting dinners, the latter of which permits larger sample sizes.

=== BYOB: bring your own bottle ===
Because some restaurants are unable or choose not to get a retail consumption license, the practice of "bring your own bottle" (BYOB) is prevalent in establishments statewide. Patrons are permitted to bring their own beer or wine to a restaurant that does not possess a liquor license, as long as there is no municipal prohibition against it. By law, a BYOB restaurant may not allow consumption of hard liquor or mixed drinks, nor may it allow consumption of beer or wine by those under 21, visibly intoxicated, or during hours in which the sale of these products is prohibited by licensees in that municipality (i.e. after closing time). Establishments offering BYOB are not allowed to assess a cover charge, charge a corkage fee, nor advertise that patrons may bring beer or wine. A recent federal court ruling found the prohibition against BYOB advertising by unlicensed establishments to be an unconstitutional violation of free speech. A restaurant or other business with a retail consumption license may allow consumers to bring their own beer or wine, though many do not.

New Jersey law prohibits strip clubs and "sexually oriented business", where stripteases and erotic dances are regularly performed, from offering both full nudity and alcohol sales. Establishments that possess a retail license and serve alcohol can only offer partially clothed services such as go-go dancing (typically in bikinis or lingerie). Clubs that are not licensed to serve alcohol will work around the restriction by implementing a bring your own bottle (BYOB) policy and operating as a "juice bar". Juice bars have the appointments of full bars but only serve non-alcoholic beverages such as water, fruit juice, and flavored carbonated beverages. Such a bar could double as a service counter for the storage of BYOB material and offer ice and mixing services to create mixed drinks using the customer-purchased ingredients. Recent court decisions have held that municipalities that allow BYOB policies for restaurants must allow the same practices for strip clubs.

== Alcohol production and distribution ==
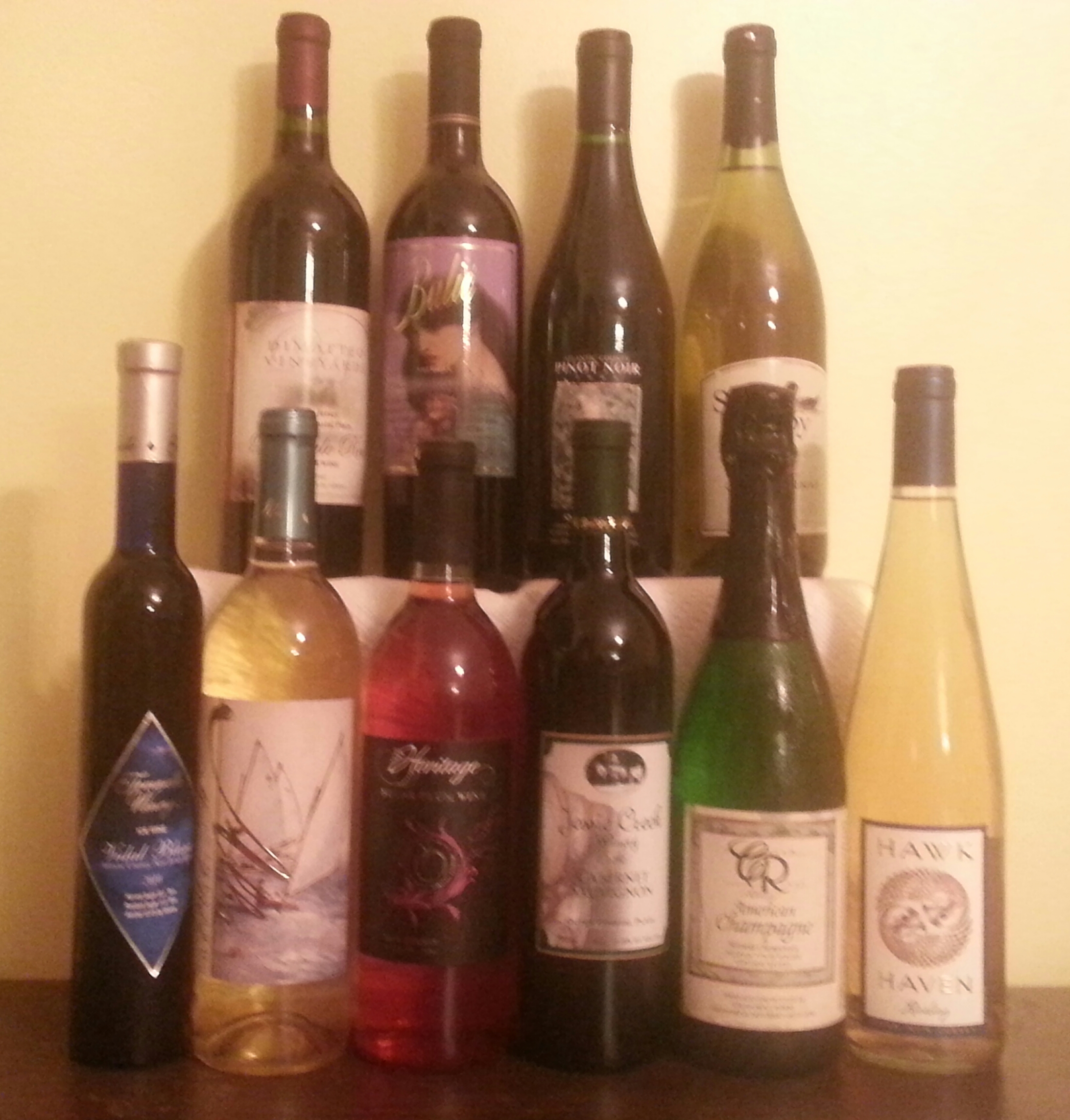
This is an assortment of New Jersey wines. New Jersey's 48 wineries produce wine from more than 90 varieties of grapes, and from over 25 other fruits.

In 1981, the state legislature began to reform the laws that governed the production of alcoholic beverages. With the passing of the New Jersey Farm Winery Act in 1981, and laws providing for licenses for brewpubs and microbreweries in the 1990s, these two industries have grown significantly and the number of wineries and breweries have steadily increased. In February 2013, New Jersey issued the first new distillery license since before Prohibition, and legislation has been proposed to make it easier to establish craft distilleries in New Jersey. As of 2014, New Jersey currently has 48 wineries, 28 breweries, and 2 distilleries.

=== Wineries ===
New Jersey winemaking dates to the colonial period. In 1767, two landowners, Edward Antill and William Alexander, Lord Stirling, were recognized by the Royal Society of Arts in London, which had challenged colonists in British North America to cultivate vinifera grapes and produce "those Sorts of Wines now consumed in Great Britain." Shortly after, Antill wrote an 80-page instructional essay on grape cultivation and winemaking that was published in the Transactions of the American Philosophical Society.

While the cultivation of grapes and fruit trees supported a flourishing wine industry in the late 19th and early 20th centuries, the effects of Prohibition and a legacy of restrictive laws after its repeal devastated the industry. For 50 years, New Jersey was limited by law to one winery license for every 1,000,000 state residents, which by 1980 effectively allowed for only seven wineries. The growth of the state's winery industry has been bolstered by the 1981 New Jersey Farm Winery Act, which repealed many Prohibition-era laws and allowed many small growers to open new wineries.

As of 2014, New Jersey has 48 licensed and operating wineries which produce wine from more than 90 varieties of grapes, and from over 25 other fruits. Many New Jersey wineries sell their products at festivals that are held annually throughout the state. In 2012, 1.56 million gallons (approximately 656,000 cases) of wine were produced by New Jersey wineries, making it the ninth-largest wine-producing state. A considerable portion of those are non-grape fruit wine, particularly apple, blueberry, raspberry, and cranberry wines; fruits produced by many farms in the state. The state's wineries generate between $30–40 million of revenue annually. New Jersey law treats hard cider as a type of wine because it is made from fermented fruits. There are currently three licensed hard cider producers in New Jersey. Cider can be produced with a plenary or farm winery license, or with the cidery and meadery license introduced in 2017.

=== Breweries ===
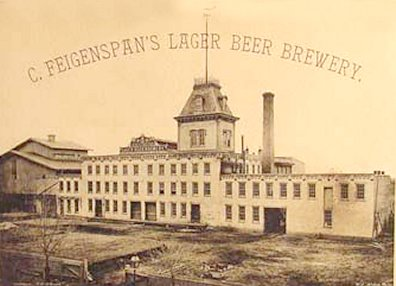
The C. Feigenspan Brewery in Newark, New Jersey, c. 1890–1900

The first brewery in New Jersey was established in a fledgling Dutch settlement in what is now Hoboken when the state was part of the New Netherland colony. It was soon destroyed by a band of Lenape in 1643 during Governor Kieft's War (1643–1645). Large German immigrant populations in Newark and Jersey City led to the establishment of a healthy brewing industry in the 19th and early 20th centuries. Brewing beer became the fourth-largest industry in Newark, with names like Kruger, Hensler, and Feigenspan among the leading industrial families in Newark.

Later, regional (and later national) brands Ballantine, and Rheingold, and Pabst, among others, operated large breweries in Newark and surrounding towns. With accusations of German propaganda and persecution of German-Americans during World War I, many of the state's brewers relocated to the Midwestern United States Prohibition closed many of the remaining breweries in the state. For instance, of Newark's 27 breweries before Prohibition, none exist today. As the industry reorganized and consolidated in the 1970s and 1980s to compete nationally, the larger producers like Ballantine (in the 1960s) Rheingold (1977), and Pabst (1985) closed their doors.

Anheuser-Busch still operate a large-production brewery in Newark, originally opened in 1951, which is used for brewing Budweiser and Rolling Rock. New Jersey offers a limited brewery license for microbreweries and a restricted brewery license for brewpubs. In 1995, the Ship Inn Restaurant and Brewery in Milford became the first brewpub in New Jersey. Within ten years, the industry expanded to 28 breweries, most of them microbreweries or brewpubs. In 2010, New Jersey craft brewers produced 32,000 barrels (992,000 gallons) of craft brew. In 2012, New Jersey liberalized its licensing laws to allow microbreweries to sell beer by the glass as part of a tour, and sell up to 15.5 gallons (i.e. a keg) for off-premises consumption. The same legislation permits brewpubs to brew up to 10,000 barrels of beer per year, and sell to wholesalers and at festivals.

=== Distilleries ===
New Jersey has had a long distilling history dating to the colonial era when large landowners converted surplus fruit into brandy, sugar into rum, and grain into whiskey. Until recently, New Jersey had only one licensed distillery, Laird & Company in Scobeyville (Colts Neck). Founded by Robert Laird, it is the oldest licensed distillery in the United States and received License No. 1 from the U.S. Department of the Treasury in 1780. George Washington, who was acquainted with the distillery's owner, once asked him for his recipe for "cyder spirits." By 1834, New Jersey boasted 388 distilleries.

Laird & Company, the oldest licensed applejack distillery in the nation ceased distilling at its New Jersey facilities in 1972, however the bottling operation remained in the state. In February 2013, the state issued the first distillery license since Prohibition to Jersey Artisan Distilling of Fairfield, which currently produces and sells rum. Other prospective distillers followed suit soon after. In August 2013, the state passed a law creating a craft distillery license. The license costs substantially less than the plenary distillery license ($938 versus $12,500), but limits production to 20,000 gallons per year. Distillers who certify that at least 51 percent of raw materials used in the distillation are grown or bought from providers in the state can label their product "New Jersey distilled."

=== Direct shipping to consumers ===
Until 2004, New Jersey permitted in-state wineries to directly ship products to in-state customers. The state did not allow out-of-state producers to ship to New Jersey residents or permit New Jersey wineries to ship to out-of-state customers. This practice was declared unconstitutional by the U.S. Supreme Court in 2005 in a case from Michigan. New Jersey's statute was subsequently struck down by the Third Circuit Court of Appeals in 2010 because such limitations were held to violate the Interstate Commerce Clause of the U.S. Constitution.

On 17 January 2012, New Jersey Governor Chris Christie signed into law a bill that legalized direct shipping from wineries to consumers, and permits New Jersey wineries to open as many as 15 offsite retail sales outlets in the state. The law allows wineries that make less than 250,000 gallons of wine annually, which includes all of New Jersey's wineries, to ship up to 12 cases of wine per year to any person over 21 in New Jersey or any other state that allows wine shipments. Because this prohibits 90% of wine made in the United States, but does not affect New Jersey's small wineries, proponents of the law fear that this section of the law will be struck down as unconstitutional. The U.S. Court of Appeals for the First Circuit had struck down a similar limit in Massachusetts in 2008 in light of the United States Supreme Court decision addressing direct shipping laws a few years earlier.

Federal law prohibits alcoholic beverages from being shipped through the mail. New Jersey effectively prohibits the shipment of beer and spirits to customers by requiring a liquor license to transport alcohol, but not having any class of liquor license that grants permission to ship beer or spirits. United Parcel Service (UPS) and Federal Express will ship wine to a person's home, but will only deliver beer or hard liquor to a licensed business. Although uncommon, it is legal for a liquor store to deliver alcoholic beverages by car or van to a person's home. ABC regulations mandate that the alcoholic beverages being delivered are paid for in advance, that they are received by someone 21 or older, and that they take place when the licensed establishment is permitted to be open.

== Legal drinking age ==
=== Underage drinking laws ===
Exceptions to New Jersey's Underage Drinking Laws

- Religious service – minors can be served alcohol, and may possess and consume alcohol at a religious observance, ceremony or rite.
- Employment – People 18 or older who own or work for a licensed establishment or BYOB restaurant can possess, sell, serve, and transport alcohol, and purchase alcohol from a manufacturer or wholesaler. They cannot consume alcohol or purchase alcohol from a retailer (e.g. liquor store, bar).
- Private location (with adult relative) – minors may be served alcohol, and may possess and consume alcohol when in a house, backyard, hotel room, private room at an unlicensed restaurant, or other area without public access, and in the presence of a relative who is at least 21.
- Private location (without adult relative) – minors may possess and consume alcohol when in a house, backyard, hotel room, private room at an unlicensed restaurant, or other area without public access, and in a town without an ordinance prohibiting it (approximately 1/4 of municipalities). It is not legal to serve a minor or knowingly allow a property to be used for underage drinking, but it is legal for the person to consume alcohol.

A person must be at least 21 years old in New Jersey to purchase alcoholic beverages in a retail establishment, or to possess or consume alcoholic beverages in a public (for example, a park or on the street) or semi-public area (e.g. restaurant, automobile). A person only needs to be 18 to own a liquor license, or to sell or serve alcohol (for example, a waiter). State law also prohibits an underage person from misrepresenting their age in a licensed establishment.

It is illegal to serve alcohol to anyone under 21, encourage an underage person to drink, knowingly allow underage drinking on property that one owns or leases, or possess alcoholic beverages on public school property without written consent of the school board or school principal. State law grants an exemption for religious services, and for parents and guardians over 21 who serve alcohol to their own children in a private location (such as a private home).

New Jersey and all other U.S. states comport with the requirement of the National Minimum Drinking Age Act of 1984, which sought to set a national standard of 21 as the minimum age for purchasing and publicly possessing alcoholic beverages. To make states comply, Congress tied a state's failure to enact a drinking age at 21 to a punitive decrease in a state's apportionment of federal highway funding. Federal law requires colleges and universities that accept federal financial aid institute policies to sanction students who violate underage drinking and other alcohol laws, and to track the number of liquor laws violations. The Chronicle of Higher Education has reported that many colleges fail to comply with these laws, and federal enforcement is virtually nonexistent.

There is no state law prohibiting consumption of alcohol by minors while on private property, but many municipalities prohibit underage consumption unless parents or adult relatives are present. Public schools are not permitted to have "24/7" conduct policies which sanction students for alcohol consumption outside of school. Minors are allowed to enter licensed establishments, and while state law does not prohibit bars and nightclubs from having events such as "teen nights," or "18 to party, 21 to drink," some municipalities impose restrictions. It is legal for a person under 21 to be in a location where underage drinking is occurring, and New Jersey does not have an "internal possession" statute criminalizing underage drinking after the fact.

=== Penalties for underage drinking ===
The state underage drinking statute has been changed and the offense is now decriminalized as of 2020. It is no longer a disorderly persons offense (misdemeanor), which upon conviction was punishable by up to 6 months in jail (rarely imposed), a $500–$1000 fine, and a mandatory 6-month suspension of the person's driver's license. The penalties are the same for using fake identification. Those who unlawfully serve alcohol to an underage person, entice an underage person to drink, knowingly permit underage drinking on their property, or bring alcohol onto a public school property face similar sanctions, except that their driver's license will not be suspended. A licensed business which serves alcohol to a person under age 21, even unintentionally, may be fined or have their liquor license suspended or revoked.

Violation of a municipal underage drinking statutes was a non-criminal offense, which had a fine of $250 for the first offense, and $350 for subsequent offenses. A person's driver's license could have been suspended for a municipal underage drinking conviction, but usually it was just a fine without a court appearance being required. There is a "good samaritan" defense to an underage drinking charge – if an underage drinker calls for medical help for another underage drinker who is ill, and cooperates with law enforcement and medical responders, neither may be prosecuted. It used to be common for a state underage drinking charge to be downgraded to a municipal ordinance violation in order for the defendant to avoid a criminal record and a suspended license. The statute of limitations for both state and municipal underage drinking charges is one year.

=== History of New Jersey's drinking age ===
The first drinking age law in New Jersey was passed in 1846. It allowed the parents of a student under 21 to sue for up to $10 ($360 in modern dollars) in damages against a tavern keeper or shopkeeper who supplied alcoholic beverages to their children. In 1880, a criminal statute was enacted, fining businesses that sold liquor to people under 18 if their parents had told the establishment not to sell to their child. The law was amended in 1888 to eliminate the parental consent provision, thus making it illegal in all cases for a tavern or liquor store to sell alcohol to person under 18. In 1908, the penalties were increased so that a tavern keeper who served a minor could be jailed. Upon the start of Prohibition, New Jersey repealed its laws regarding the sale of alcohol to minors since the Eighteenth Amendment to the United States Constitution prohibited almost all liquor sales.

Upon repeal of Prohibition and the passage of the Alcoholic Beverage Control Law, the ABC issued regulations that prohibited bars and liquor stores from selling alcohol to a person under 21, which was considered the age of majority at that time. In 1939, it became a criminal offense to sell alcohol to a person under 21, and for a person under 21 to purchase or consume alcohol in a licensed establishment. The state criminalized the underage possession of alcohol in motor vehicles and other public areas in 1957, possibly in response to young New Jerseyans traveling to New York, where the drinking age was 18, and returning home with liquor. For many years laws against underage drinking and the serving of alcohol to minors did not apply on private property, though an adult who supplied a substantial amount of liquor to an underage person could possibly be prosecuted for contributing to the delinquency of a minor Furthermore, arrests and criminal prosecutions for underage drinking in bars or public areas were very uncommon before the 1980s.

New Jersey's drinking age was lowered to 18 in 1973 as part of a broader legal change which reduced New Jersey's age of majority from 21 to 18. Much of the impetus for lowering the drinking age to 18 was to grant returning Vietnam veterans the right to purchase alcohol. Possibly because of concerns about 18-year-old high school students being able to legally purchase liquor, and then illegally consume it school, the state raised the drinking age to 19 in 1980. Citing statistics that indicated an increase in car deaths among drivers under 21, the drinking age was raised back to 21 in 1983. At the same time, the penalties for underage drinking were increased to include a mandatory driver's license suspension. In 1985, the state made it illegal for an adult to give alcohol to a person under 21, with exception for religious services and parents serving alcohol to their own children at home or in a private area.

Historically, a few municipalities had ordinances against underage drinking on private property, but a class action lawsuit in 1998 against the town of Avalon nullified these laws. In 2000, the New Jersey Legislature passed a bill criminalizing underage consumption of alcoholic beverages on private property New Jersey Governor Christine Whitman pocket vetoed the bill over privacy concerns: "While I completely support the intent of the bill, I am concerned that the bill's prohibitions could be construed to apply to situations in which an underage person consumes even a small amount of alcohol under the watchful eye of an adult family member." Later that year, Whitman signed a revised bill that allowed municipalities to pass ordinance prohibiting underage drinking on private property. Besides giving municipalities a choice on whether to implement such a policy, the revised bill imposed substantially lighter penalties on underage drinkers, and the new law made an exception for alcohol provided by any relative, not just a parent or guardian.

== Drunk driving ==
=== DUI laws ===
Like all other US states, New Jersey sets a 0.08 percent weight by volume blood alcohol content (BAC) as the threshold for intoxication when operating a motor vehicle (e.g. automobile, boat). It is possible to be charged with driving under the influence (DUI) with a BAC level below 0.08%, but there is a presumption in that situation that the driver is not intoxicated. State law prohibits those under 21 from driving if their BAC is 0.01% or more, prohibits the operation of a commercial vehicle with a BAC of 0.04% or more, and mandates that drivers submit a breath sample if requested by a police officer. To be convicted of DUI in New Jersey, a person must be operating or attempting to operate a motorized vehicle; thus activities such as sleeping in a car while intoxicated or bicycling while drunk are not illegal.

Drivers are not legally required to take field sobriety tests, although the results are admissible in court. The Alcotest has replaced the Breathalyzer as the standard device for determining blood alcohol level. When a driver is arrested for DUI, the police are prohibited from using force to obtain a breath, blood, or urine sample, and must warn the driver of the consequences of refusing a breath sample. In 2010, the New Jersey Supreme Court overturned the breath sample refusal conviction of a non-English speaking driver, ruling that drivers must be notified of the law in a language that they understand. A person can be charged with DUI or breath refusal up to 90 days after the incident, except in cases of serious injury or death, in which case the statute of limitations is 5 years.

New Jersey is one of only two states (along with Wisconsin) that classify DUI as a traffic violation, and not a criminal offense, except in cases of serious injury or death. Because it is not a criminal offense, those charged in New Jersey with DUI and related offenses are not fingerprinted, do not have the right to a jury trial, DUI arrests and convictions are not submitted to the FBI's NCIC criminal database, and DUI arrests and convictions cannot be expunged. Statutory criminal defenses (e.g. duress, entrapment) are not available for DUI, and in State v. Hammond, the state Supreme Court upheld the conviction of a person who drove after unknowingly having his drink spiked with alcohol. Common-law criminal defenses are available in DUI cases, and a state appellate court reversed the conviction of a person who drove while intoxicated in order to escape assailants, citing the doctrine of necessity.

=== Penalties for DUI ===
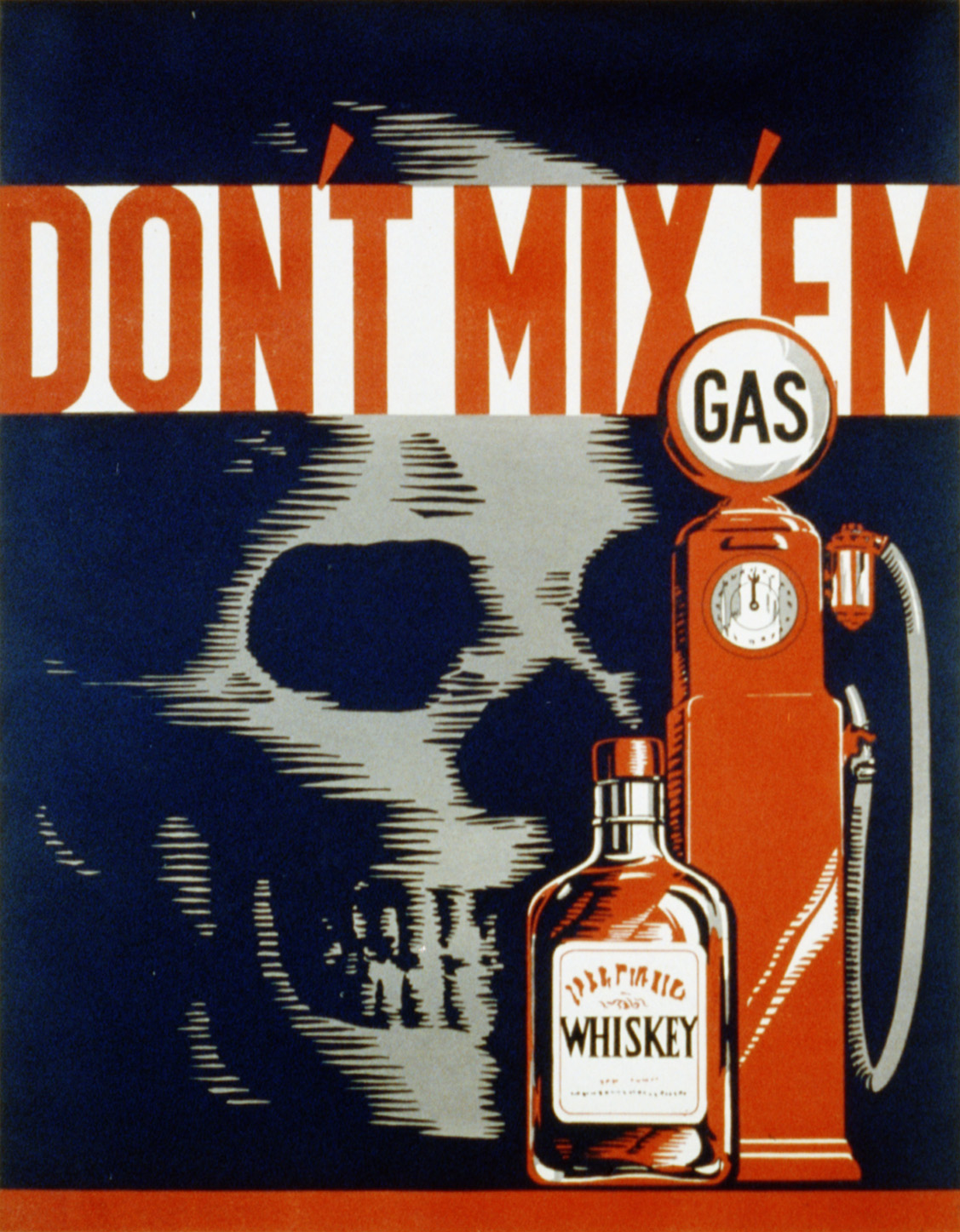
A poster from 1937 warning about the dangers of drunk driving. New Jersey instituted its first DUI law in 1909.

Penalties for DUI vary by level of intoxication and number of previous convictions. A first offense DUI with a BAC level of less than 0.10% faces a fine of $250 to $400, an automobile insurance surcharge of $1000 per year for 3 years, 12 hours of alcohol education, a 3-month license suspension, and imprisonment for up to 30 days (rarely imposed). If the driver's BAC level is 0.10% or greater, the fine increases to $300 to $500, and the license suspension increase to 7 to 12 months. If the driver's BAC level is 0.15% or greater, the driver will be required to have an ignition interlock device installed in their car for 6 to 12 months after they have their license restored. New Jersey does not have administrative license revocation, and thus a suspected drunk driver's license is not suspended until they are convicted.

A person under 21 who is convicted of driving with a BAC level of at least 0.01%, but less than 0.08% will have their driver's license suspended for 1 to 3 months, be required to perform 15–30 hours of community service, and take part in an alcohol education program. Penalties for refusal to submit a breath sample are the same as driving with a BAC over 0.15%. The holder of a commercial driver's license (CDL) is subject to a one-year suspension of their CDL for the first offense, and a lifetime CDL suspension for repeat offenses if they drive a commercial vehicle with a BAC of 0.04% or greater, drive an automobile with a BAC of 0.08% or greater, or refuse to submit a breath sample. More severe penalties may be imposed if the DUI took place within 1000 feet of a school, or if there was a juvenile in the vehicle. DUI crashes resulting in serious injury or death are considered indictable crimes.

New Jersey prohibits plea bargaining in DUI cases unless the prosecutor believes there is insufficient evidence to prove the case, and New Jersey does not offer hardship (work) licenses for people convicted of DUI. Because DUI is not a criminal offense in New Jersey, defendants are ineligible for pretrial intervention (PTI) and other diversion programs. A previous DUI conviction, in New Jersey or another state, cannot be used to disqualify a person from such programs, and those charged with an indictable offense stemming from drunk driving (e.g. cases involving serious injuries or eluding arrest) are eligible for PTI. A person convicted of DUI is barred from recovering crash-related damages from other drivers, but may be able to sue the business or person who served them alcoholic beverages.

For a second DUI conviction in a 10-year period, irrespective of BAC, there is a fine of $500–$1,000, 2–90 days imprisonment, a 2-year license suspension, an automobile insurance surcharge of $1,000 a year for 3 years, and installation of an ignition interlock device for 1 to 3 years after license restoration. A person who has 3 or more DUI convictions and a gap of less than 10 years since the last conviction incurs a fine of $1,000, 6 months imprisonment, a 10-year license suspension, an automobile insurance surcharge of $1,500 a year for 3 years, and installation of an ignition interlock device for 1 to 3 years after license restoration. Jail sentences issued in New Jersey for DUI are often served through work release programs (e.g. weekends in jail).

=== History of New Jersey's drunk driving laws ===
New Jersey first established drunk driving laws in 1909, making it a disorderly persons offense (misdemeanor). In 1921, DUI was converted to a traffic violation with a 1-year license suspension for the first violation, and a 5-year suspension for repeat violations. Penalties were increased in 1926 to a 2-year suspension, and a lifetime suspension and a mandatory 3 months in jail for repeat offenses. In 1951, out of concerns regarding the evidence needed to prove "intoxication", the New Jersey Legislature amended the DUI statute to state that a driver with a BAC of 0.15% or greater was presumed to be intoxicated. A driver with a BAC of 0.15% or greater could be acquitted if they could show that they were not physically intoxicated.

Because of new ideas about the treatment of alcoholism, the lifetime suspension was downgraded to a 10-year suspension in 1952. DUI prosecutions remained difficult in cases when drivers refused to take a Breathalyzer test, and so in 1966, the state authorized the suspension of a person's driver's license for refusing to submit a breath sample. In 1977, the BAC limit was reduced to 0.10%, but the law was modified to differentiate between the second and third offenses, with lesser penalties for first and second convictions. In 1983, the state established a per se rule wherein a person over the limit was considered drunk in all cases (that is, not merely a presumption). Nine years later, the 0.01% BAC limit for drivers under 21 was instituted, and in 2003, the 0.10% BAC limit was reduced to 0.08% to comply with federal highway funding requirements.

== Other alcohol-related legal issues ==
=== Open container and public consumption laws ===
It is illegal in New Jersey to have an open container of alcohol in the passenger portion of a private automobile, but open bottles of alcohol may be transported in the trunk of a car, and consumption of alcohol on a bus, train, taxi, limousine, or boat is permitted. The penalty for having an open container of alcohol in a car is $200 fine for the first offense, and a $250 fine or 10 days of community service for repeat violations. The state Motor Vehicle Commission does not impose license points for open container convictions, but some automobile insurance companies impose a surcharge. New Jersey's law on open containers in motor vehicles is compliant with the Transportation Equity Act for the 21st Century (TEA-21), a federal act passed in 1998 which reduces the highway funding of states that do not prohibit open containers in passenger areas of automobiles.

New Jersey's state parks and forests prohibit the possession or consumption of alcoholic beverages except at pre-approved events. There is no state law against public consumption of alcohol in other locations, but most municipalities have open container laws prohibiting or restricting public consumption. The fine for alcohol possession in a state park is $71, whereas municipal fines for public consumption violations can be as high as $2000, although they are generally much lower. Per the Alcoholism Treatment and Rehabilitation Act (ATRA), public intoxication without accompanying disorderly behavior is not a criminal offense, and municipalities are prohibited from making ordinances against public intoxication. New Jersey law allows a police officer to take people found to be intoxicated in public to their residence or to a medical facility.

=== Purchasing and home production restrictions ===
Unlike many other states, New Jersey imposes no restrictions on the types or quantities of alcoholic beverages that a person of legal age may purchase. Grain alcohol, caffeinated alcoholic beverages, and absinthe can be legally sold, and state law imposes no limitations on the alcohol content of beer or wine. New Jersey does not require kegs to be registered, and state ABC regulations prohibit municipal keg registration laws. A resident can import any amount of alcohol into the state for personal use, but a $50 permit is required if more than three gallons of beer, one gallon of wine, or one half-gallon of spirits are imported within a 24-hour period. Any person who is 21 years or older may produce up to 200 gallons of beer or wine per year. No permit is required, but any brewing or winemaking must take place at a private home or non-commercial property, and any beer and wine produced cannot be sold. It is a criminal offense to possess an unregistered still, or distill any amount of hard liquor.

=== Dram shop liability and social host liability ===
Bars and restaurants are considered strictly liable for their patrons' behavior, and liquor licenses can be suspended or revoked if a customer engages in illegal activity (e.g. fighting, public urination) after drinking. New Jersey law recognizes both dram shop liability and social host liability, wherein the server of alcohol to visibly intoxicated persons or minors is liable if that person then causes death or injury to a third party in an alcohol-related automobile collision or other incident. In order to mitigate liability, the Division of Alcoholic Beverage Control (ABC) grants licensed establishments the right to exclude any patron for any reason, but warns business against violating civil rights laws.

While the courts in New Jersey allow actions based on dram shop liability or social host liability, they will instruct a jury to consider the intoxicated person's negligence under the doctrine of comparative negligence. Licensed establishments and social hosts may be liable for drunk driving incidents, assaults, falls, and other injuries and property damage caused by a customer, but are not liable for behavior which is unforeseeable (e.g. falling out of a tree), nor are they liable if they only served food or non-alcoholic beverages to a drunk patron. Dram shop and social host litigation may involve both compensatory and punitive damages. There is a two-year statute of limitations for such lawsuits, but the time limit may be extended if the victim is a juvenile.

Social hosts are given more liability protection than licensed businesses in that a private person is generally only liable for the actions of guests over 21 if their blood alcohol content is above 0.15%, and the lawsuit involves drunk driving injuries. As long as a guest is not underage, a social host has no liability for assaults, falls, and other non-DUI injuries. Although most alcohol-related lawsuits involve parties injured by drunk drivers, there have been cases in New Jersey where drunk drivers were able to successfully sue the establishment that served them. Recently, in Voss v. Tranquillino the New Jersey courts held that a drunk driver can sue a bar or restaurant under the "Dram Shop Act" and prevail under the theory that:

[a] person who sustains personal injury or property damage as a result of the negligent service of alcoholic beverages by a licensed alcoholic beverage server may recover damages from a licensed alcoholic beverage server if the server was negligent (i.e. served a visibly intoxicated person), the injury was proximately caused by the negligent service of alcoholic beverages, and the injury was a foreseeable consequence of the negligent service.

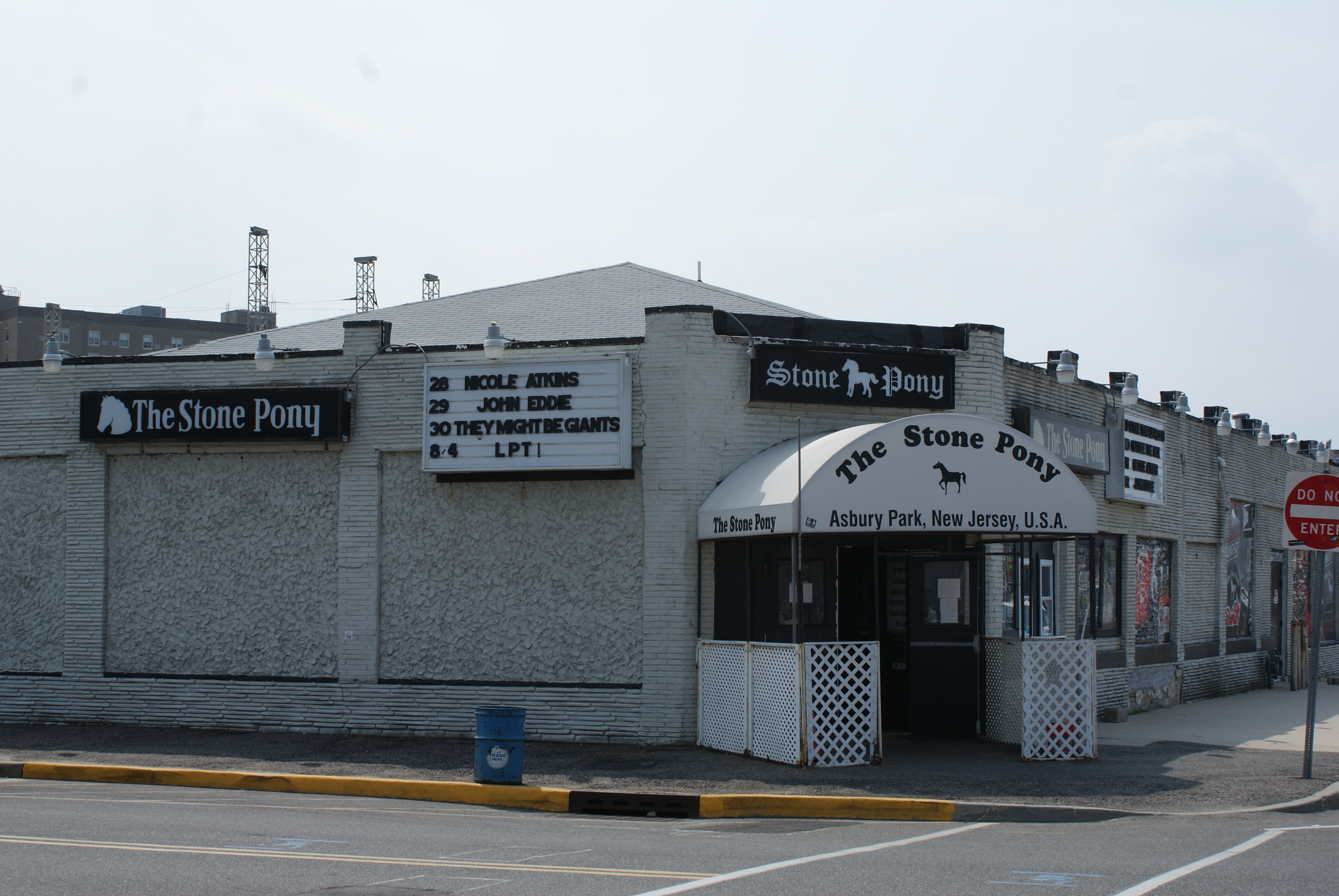
The Stone Pony nightclub in Asbury Park filed for bankruptcy in 1991 because of a series of drunk driving lawsuits.

In 1959, the New Jersey Supreme Court permitted a lawsuit against several taverns that had served alcohol to an underage person, who then caused a fatal automobile crash. The court stated that its decision was based on the fact that this conduct was already illegal under ABC regulations, stating that, "We are convinced that recognition of the plaintiff's claim will afford a fairer measure of justice to innocent third parties whose injuries are brought about by the unlawful and negligent sale of alcoholic beverages to minors and intoxicated persons." New Jersey courts have expanded the dram shop doctrine to include social hosts who serve alcoholic beverages to guests, and automobile owners who allow drunk drivers to operate their cars.

Because of complaints from bar owners about their inability to obtain liability insurance, the state passed legislation in 1987 to limit liability to cases where the server could have realistically known that the patron was underage or intoxicated, and to limit lawsuits to types of injuries that are foreseeable. The act also instituted the legal standard of comparative negligence in these cases, wherein the monetary damages against a licensed establishment can be reduced if there are others who are also negligent (e.g. the patron, other bars). Additional legislation passed in 1987 substantially limited the liability of social hosts for adult guests.

=== Intoxication defense, diversion, and treatment ===
New Jersey's criminal code prohibits voluntary intoxication from being used directly as a defense to a crime, though if a crime requires that the conduct was committed intentionally, intoxication may prevent the person from having the necessary mens rea to be guilty. For example, a person accused of killing a person during a fight while drunk may not be guilty of murder because New Jersey law requires that the actor purposely or knowingly "causes death or serious bodily injury resulting in death." In such a case, an accused killer could be found guilty of manslaughter, which only requires reckless conduct, including acts committed while intoxicated.

Involuntary and pathological intoxication are affirmative defenses to all criminal offenses in New Jersey, but are not defenses to regulatory law and traffic law offenses that are considered strict liability violations (e.g. environmental regulations, DUI). Involuntary intoxication relates to cases where someone did not know that they had consumed alcohol (e.g. a spiked drink). Pathological intoxication is applicable where, for medical reasons, a person had an exaggerated response to alcohol. To be used as a defense, the person being charged must show that "at the time of his conduct did not know the nature and quality of the act he was doing, or if he did know it, that he did not know what he was doing was wrong." Contracts made with an intoxicated person may be voided by courts if "the defendant was so intoxicated" that he or she "could not realize and appreciate the nature and consequences of what defendant was doing."

In 1976, the New Jersey legislature passed the Alcoholism Treatment and Rehabilitation Act (ATRA), which declared that the public policy of New Jersey was that "alcoholics and intoxicated persons may not be subjected to criminal prosecution because of their consumption of alcoholic beverages, but rather should be afforded a continuum of treatment in order that they may lead normal lives as productive members of society." Since the implementation of ATRA, it has been the general policy of New Jersey to treat alcoholism as a disease. Under ATRA, an intoxicated person arrested for a non-indictable criminal offense may be taken to a medical facility, instead of jail, and will be released as soon as they are sober, or at most 48 hours.

Likewise a person charged with a non-indictable criminal offense, including those being adjudicated in juvenile court, may request alcohol treatment in lieu of criminal prosecution. If a physician attests that the defendant is an alcoholic, the court may impose inpatient treatment for up to 30 days, outpatient treatment for up to 60 days, or both. If the person successfully completes the treatment program, the criminal charges will be dismissed. A person with alcohol dependency who has been charged with an indictable crime may apply for "special probation" (also known as drug court). Those charged with severe violent crimes (e.g. murder, kidnapping) are not eligible, but people charged with offenses with mandatory sentences, or who have extensive non-violent criminal records may be eligible. If admitted to special probation, the defendant will be subject to 18 months to 5 years of intense probation and residential treatment as an alternative to prison.

An employer who dismisses an employee for being an alcoholic is in violation of the state's anti-discrimination laws unless they can show that person's condition affected their job performance or created a substantial safety risk. No general hospitals may refuse a patient treatment for intoxication or alcoholism, and all individual and group health insurance plans which are regulated by the state of New Jersey are required to offer both inpatient and outpatient treatment for alcoholism. Under federal law, all group health insurances plans for private companies with more than 50 employees must offer insurance coverage for alcoholism that is equal to their insurance coverage for other medical conditions.

== Areas outside state ABC jurisdiction ==
=== Casinos ===
In a 1976 referendum, New Jersey voters approved casino gambling in Atlantic City. Because of concerns about organized crime connections to gambling, New Jersey enacted strict regulations that included licensing of all casino employees and contractors, and a separation of powers between the Division of Gaming Enforcement (DGE) and the Casino Control Commission (CCC). The Division of Gaming Enforcement is part of the New Jersey Department of Law and Public Safety, and is responsible for investigating casino license applications, monitoring casino operations, and enforcing New Jersey's casino laws and regulations as defined in Title 5, Chapter 12 of New Jersey's statutes, and Title 13, Chapter 69I of New Jersey's Administrative Code. The Casino Control Commission is an independent agency in the state Treasury Department with both quasi-legislative and quasi-judicial powers, and is responsible for creating casino regulations, hearing appeals of DGE penalties, and make decisions on casino licensing. In light of such regulation and the uniqueness of casino gambling, New Jersey's twelve casinos are not under the jurisdiction of the Division of Alcoholic Beverage Control (ABC) or Atlantic City's alcoholic beverage control board.

Casinos, and vendors serving, selling or storing alcoholic beverages for a casino, are required to obtain a casino hotel alcoholic beverage (CHAB) license from the Division of Gaming Enforcement. CHAB licenses must be renewed every five years. New Jersey's casino alcohol regulations are divided into five different regions of activity: (a) the casino floor (includes simulcasting facilities); (b) the hotel (includes restaurants and meeting rooms); (c) package goods; (d) room service; and (e) storage. Alcohol sold or given away on the casino floor and in hotel areas must be in an open container for immediate consumption, whereas alcohol sold in a package goods area must be sealed. Alcoholic beverages brought to a patron as a room service may be open or closed, whereas storage areas must not be accessible to the public.

Although casinos are not under the jurisdiction of the ABC, many of the regulations for casinos and casino vendors are similar to those for ABC class C retailer licensees. Casinos may generally only purchase alcoholic beverages from licensed wholesalers (i.e. ABC Class B licensees). A casino may have a brewpub on site, but production is limited to 3,000 barrels of beer per year, and the beer may only be distributed in open containers on casino floor and in hotel areas of the casino. Casinos may obtain a permit to have tastings, and tasting dinners. Non-profit organizations may obtain a permit to have a social event at a casino where they charge for alcoholic beverages. Organizations are limited to 12 casino social event permits per year, and a given casino may only host 25 such events per year.

Casinos are not allowed to serve alcohol to people who are under 21 or intoxicated, are strictly liable for patron's behavior, and are subject to dram shop lawsuits for injuries stemming from negligence in serving alcohol. Casinos are permitted to give away "comp" drinks, and many do to reward and encourage gambling. Except on New Year's Eve, a casino cannot sell an unlimited amount of alcoholic beverages at a set price, nor may they require patrons to purchase alcoholic beverages in order to access an event or service. In 1983, because of difficulties in preventing underage drinking in casinos, the legal age to gamble at a casino was raised to 21. In Hakimoglu v. Trump Taj Mahal Associates, a federal appeals court decided that casinos are not legally responsible for gambling losses and debts incurred by intoxicated gamblers, but it is not clear if the decision applies if the intoxicated gambler is also underage.

Because they serve alcoholic beverages, casino nightclubs are prohibited from offering full nudity. In 2013, Trump Taj Mahal opened the nation's first casino strip club, featuring scantily clad dancers. New Jersey's casinos initially had closing times like most ABC-licensed establishments, but were allowed to stay open 24 hours per day, 7 days a week starting in 1992 It is legal for a minor to go to a casino, insofar as they do not gamble, consume alcoholic beverages in public areas of the casino, or remain on the gambling floor. Because Atlantic City has ordinances prohibiting underage drinking on private property, it is illegal for a person underage 21 to drink in a casino hotel room unless a family member is present.

=== Federal lands ===
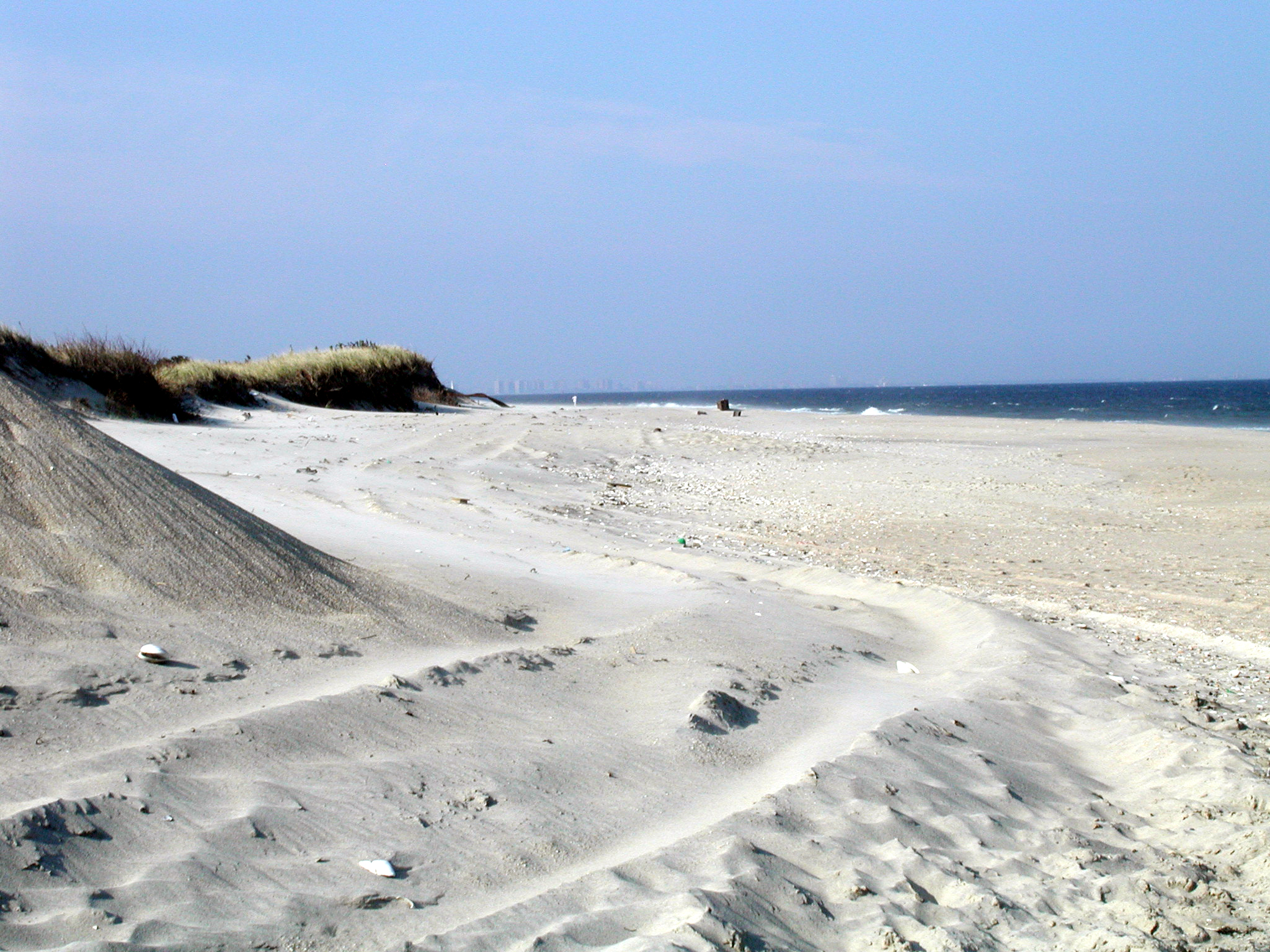
Sandy Hook is one of the few places in New Jersey where alcohol may be consumed on a beach without a permit.

The applicability of state and municipal alcohol laws on federal lands is a complex and partially unresolved legal issue that depends on whether the federal property is considered a federal enclave, what rights the state reserved when it granted the property to the federal government, and whether the law is criminal or civil. If the federal property is not an enclave, the federal government either has concurrent jurisdiction (shared authority with the state) or proprietary jurisdiction (only the rights of a landowner), and the state can enforce alcohol laws.

If the federal property is an enclave, then the federal government has exclusive jurisdiction, unless the state reserved rights when it ceded the land to the federal government. The Assimilative Crimes Act makes it a federal crime to violate a state law while at a federal enclave in that state. The Assimilative Crimes Act only applies to criminal laws (not regulatory laws), and is not applicable if the conduct is already regulated by federal law. Under federal law, military facilities are required to adopt state traffic laws, but the base commander is permitted to institute additional traffic laws.

In New Jersey, older Department of Defense and Department of Interior properties such as Fort Dix and parts of Sandy Hook are federal enclaves, but most other federal properties are not enclaves. Because New Jersey generally did not reserve any right to regulate federal enclaves, state liquor licensing rules and alcohol taxes cannot be enforced. There is no universal policy regarding the sale of alcoholic beverages on federal lands, but almost all military bases, and some national parks allow for alcohol concessions, both for on-premises or off-premises consumption.

Unlike the state, federal agencies which allow alcohol sales do not have a system of liquor licenses or alcoholic beverage control boards, but instead simply award contracts to business per federal procurement laws. New Jersey does not consider municipal ordinances to be criminal offenses, and so open container laws cannot be enforced in federal enclaves under the Assimilative Crimes Act. Public consumption of alcohol is allowed on federal lands, except when in an automobile, or when the park superintendent has prohibited open containers in an area. For example, it is legal to consume alcoholic beverages on the beach at Sandy Hook.

Because DUI in New Jersey is a non-criminal traffic violation, state DUI laws are not subject to the Assimilative Crimes Act. Members of the Armed Forces can be court martialed for drunk driving, military bases can enforce New Jersey traffic law on civilians, and it is a misdemeanor under federal law to drive while intoxicated on land administered by the National Park Service, the Department of Veterans Affairs, or the Postal Service. Similar to New Jersey, federal DUI statutes prohibit the operation of a motor vehicle while having a BAC of 0.08% or greater, and require a driver to give a breath sample if requested by a law enforcement authority.

Federal DUI law differs from New Jersey law in that there are no mandatory minimum jail sentences, irrespective of the number of previous DUI convictions, and plea bargaining is allowed. A federal DUI conviction will result in unexpungeable criminal record. Federal courts cannot suspend a driver's license, but may notify the New Jersey Motor Vehicle Commission of a DUI conviction. In federal enclaves that are under the jurisdiction of other federal departments (e.g. Fish and Wildlife Service), it is unclear if drunk driving could be prosecuted since the Assimilative Crimes Act is inapplicable, and there is no federal law defining DUI on those properties.

Under federal law, the drinking age for the Armed Forces is the same as the state or nation where the military base is located, or the drinking age of a state or nation within 50 miles of the base. Effectively, that restricts the purchase of alcohol at New Jersey military bases to those over 21. Irrespective of state laws on underage consumption, the Army, Navy, Air Force, and Coast Guard prohibit the consumption of alcohol by underage personnel when stationed in the United States. Marines under 21 are permitted to drink alcohol at U.S. bases on special occasions.

Federal law states that national parks will have the same underage laws as the state that they are located in, and the Assimilative Crimes Act is applicable to New Jersey's underage drinking statute. Thus, in a private location, such as a cabin in a federal enclave in New Jersey, a parent can serve alcohol to their child, and an underage person can possess and consume alcohol. Outside of these exceptions, underage drinking and serving alcohol to a minor are federal misdemeanors, punishable by a fine and up to 6 months in jail. There is a five-year statute of limitations for DUI, underage drinking, and other alcohol violations that take place in federal enclaves.

== See also ==
- Law of New Jersey
- Alcohol laws of the United States
- List of wineries, breweries, and distilleries in New Jersey
- New Jersey Farm Winery Act
- New Jersey Wine Industry Advisory Council
