= Pennsylvania House of Representatives, District 62 =

American legislative district

Pennsylvania's 62nd State House of Representatives district
Representative
James Struzzi; R–White Township, Indiana County
- Population (2022): 64,920

The 62nd Pennsylvania House of Representatives District is located in west central Pennsylvania and has been represented by James Struzzi since 2019.

== District Profile ==
The 62nd District is located in Indiana County and includes the following areas:

- Armagh
- Armstrong Township
- Black Lick Township
- Blairsville
- Brush Valley Township
- Buffington Township
- Burrell Township
- Center Township
- Cherryhill Township
- Clymer
- Conemaugh Township
- Creekside
- East Wheatfield Township
- Homer City
- Indiana
- Saltsburg
- Shelocta
- White Township
- Young Township

== Representatives ==
Representative	Party	Years	District home	Note
Prior to 1969, seats were apportioned by county.
Frank E. Moore	Republican	1969 – 1970		
William Rodger Shane	Democrat	1971 – 1976		
Paul Wass	Republican	1977 – 1990	Indiana	Unsuccessful candidate for reelection
Sara Steelman	Democrat	1991 – 2002	Indiana	Unsuccessful candidate for reelection
Dave L. Reed	Republican	2003 – 2019	Indiana	
James Struzzi	Republican	2019 – present	White Township	Incumbent

== Recent election results ==
PA House election, 2024: Pennsylvania House, District 62
Party	Candidate	Votes	%
Republican	Jim Struzzi (incumbent)	Unopposed	
Total votes		28,152	100.00
Republican hold			

PA House election, 2022: Pennsylvania House, District 62
Party	Candidate	Votes	%
Republican	Jim Struzzi (incumbent)	18,147	70.47
Democratic	Brian Doyle	7,604	29.53
Total votes		25,751	100.00
Republican hold			

PA House election, 2020: Pennsylvania House, District 62
Party	Candidate	Votes	%
Republican	Jim Struzzi (incumbent)	19,943	68.41
Democratic	Dennis Semsick	9,211	31.59
Total votes		29,154	100.00
Republican hold			

PA House election, 2018: Pennsylvania House, District 62
Party	Candidate	Votes	%
Republican	Jim Struzzi	12,321	58.18
Democratic	Logan Dellafiora	8,858	41.82
Total votes		21,179	100.00
Republican hold			

PA House election, 2016: Pennsylvania House, District 62
Party	Candidate	Votes	%
Republican	Dave Reed (incumbent)	18,909	68.88
Democratic	Patrick Edwards	8,544	31.12
Total votes		27,453	100.00
Republican hold			
