= Paul Wass =

American politician (1925–2020)

Member of the Pennsylvania House of Representatives from the 62nd district
- In office 1977–1990
- Preceded by: William Rodger Shane
- Succeeded by: Sara Steelman

Personal details
- Born: July 7, 1925 Iselin, Young Township, Indiana County, Pennsylvania
- Died: December 13, 2020 (aged 95) Indiana, Pennsylvania
- Party: Republican

Paul Wass (July 7, 1925 – December 13, 2020) was a Republican member of the Pennsylvania House of Representatives.

Wass was born in Iselin, Young Township, Indiana County, Pennsylvania and graduated from Elders Ridge Vocational High School. He worked on a farm, at a tire and rubber factory, and was manager of a cemetery. Wass went to the University of Pennsylvania. Wass and his wife owned a food stand business at the Indiana County Fair and at other fairs and festivals. Wass served as auditor of Indiana County from 1965 to 1968 and as treasurer of Indiana County from 1968 to 1976. He then served in the Pennsylvania House from 1976 until 1990.
