= Sara Steelman =

American politician (born 1946)

Sara G. Steelman

Member of the Pennsylvania House of Representatives from the 62nd district
- In office January 1, 1991 – November 30, 2002
- Preceded by: Paul Wass
- Succeeded by: Dave L. Reed

Personal details
- Born: April 24, 1946 (age 80) Wichita, Kansas
- Party: Democratic
- Spouse: John Henry Steelman
- Children: 1 child
- Occupation: Biologist

Sara G. Steelman (born 1946 in Wichita, Kansas) of Indiana, Pennsylvania, American biologist and politician, served six terms as a Democratic member of the Pennsylvania House of Representatives from 1991 until 2002. Steelman is married to John Henry Steelman, a mathematics professor at Indiana University of Pennsylvania. She is a 1963 graduate of Southeast High School in Wichita, Kansas. She graduated with a degree in Zoology from the University of Chicago in 1967 and earned a Ph.D. in behavioural genetics from Stanford University in 1976. She moved to Indiana in 1986 when her husband joined the faculty at Indiana University of Pennsylvania.

She was first elected to represent the 62nd legislative district in 1990, defeating Republican Paul Wass. She was also a supporter of reform of house rules to provide more openness and more participation by rank and file legislators. She proposed a keg registration law to combat underage drinking.

She was defeated for re-election in 2002 by 24-year-old Republican Dave L. Reed. Both candidates made improving the local economic climate part of their platforms. As a challenger, Reed raised $120,000 for the campaign and knocked on 11,000 doors in the district. During the campaign, Steelman "erupted" on the district's airwaves with taxpayer-funded "public service announcements" for the first time in a decade.

She then worked as director of the Indiana Arts Council.
