= Young Township, Pennsylvania =

Young Township, Pennsylvania, may refer to:

- Young Township, Indiana County, Pennsylvania
- Young Township, Jefferson County, Pennsylvania
