= Steve Souchock =

American baseball player (1919–2002)

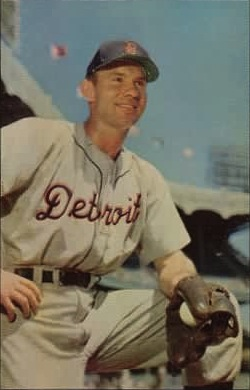
- Souchock in about 1953.
- Outfielder / First baseman
- Born: March 3, 1919; Yatesboro, Pennsylvania, U.S.
- Died: July 28, 2002 (aged 83); Westland, Michigan, U.S.
- Batted: Right Threw: Right

MLB debut
- May 25, 1946, for the New York Yankees

Last MLB appearance
- April 15, 1955, for the Detroit Tigers

MLB statistics
- Batting average: .255
- Home runs: 50
- Runs batted in: 186
- Stats at Baseball Reference

Teams
- New York Yankees (1946, 1948); Chicago White Sox (1949); Detroit Tigers (1951–1955)

Stephen Souchock (March 3, 1919 – July 28, 2002), nicknamed "Bud", was an American Major League Baseball outfielder and first baseman and a former veteran who served in the military during World War II. His Major League Baseball career lasted a total of eight years, after he served in the military for three years. Born in Yatesboro, Pennsylvania, Souchock worked on the assembly line at a Ford Motor Company factory during his early life. He also played semi-pro American football for the Dearborn Club in 1938. During his baseball career, he batted and threw right-handed.

== Career ==
=== Minor League Baseball ===
New York Yankees' scout Bill Skiff had scouted Souchock and eventually he signed with the New York Yankees in June 1939. From 1939 to 1942, Souchock played baseball in the New York Yankees organization. In 1942, Souchock was the Eastern League Most Valuable Player and won the league batting title with a batting average of .315.

=== Military service ===
In 1943, the Yankees were possibly going to call-up and use Souchock as a replacement for Buddy Hassett as first baseman in Major League Baseball, but he instead entered military service that January. He served in the 691st Tank Destroyer Battalion of the 87th Infantry Division, US Army. He served in the European Theater of Operations. Serving in the military for three years, he eventually earned the rank of First Sergeant. He fought in the Battle of the Bulge. His unit was attached to Patton's 3rd Army. Toward the end of his military service, Souchock earned a Bronze Star in Europe as commander of a five-man gun crew. He returned home with five battle stars in late 1945, Souchock said, "The war cost me three important years, as it did many ballplayers." On December 6, 1945, at Indiantown Gap, Pennsylvania, Souchock was discharged from military service.

=== Major League Baseball ===
The following year on May 25, 1946, Souchock made his major league debut with the New York Yankees. That year, he played 47 games and batted .302 with two home runs. He had been listed at 6-02½ in height, and 203 lb. in weight. He played two baseball seasons with the New York Yankees, until being traded on December 14, 1948, by the New York Yankees to the Chicago White Sox for outfielder Jim Delsing. He played in 84 games with the Chicago White Sox, hitting seven home runs. On November 16, 1950, Souchock was drafted by the Detroit Tigers from the Chicago White Sox in the 1950 rule 5 draft. For the last five years of his Major League Baseball career, Souchock played with the Detroit Tigers. He broke his wrist in 1954, which ended his effectiveness. His last game was played on April 15, 1955. He later managed in the Yankee farm system (1956–1960) and scouted for them and the Tigers.

Souchock died on July 28, 2002, in Dearborn, Michigan.
