= Dave L. Reed =

American politician (born 1978)

Dave Reed
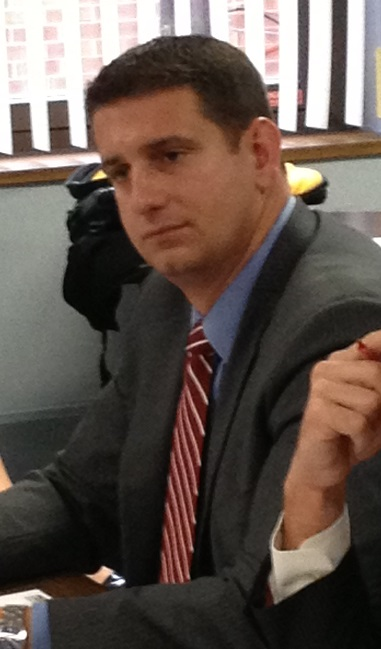

Majority Leader of the Pennsylvania House of Representatives
- In office January 6, 2015 – November 30, 2018
- Preceded by: Mike Turzai
- Succeeded by: Bryan Cutler

Member of the Pennsylvania House of Representatives from the 62nd district
- In office January 7, 2003 – November 30, 2018
- Preceded by: Sara Steelman
- Succeeded by: James Struzzi

Personal details
- Born: March 6, 1978 (age 48) Blairsville, Pennsylvania, U.S.
- Party: Republican
- Spouse: Heather Camp
- Education: Indiana University of Pennsylvania (BA, MA)

Dave L. Reed (born March 6, 1978) is a Republican former member, and former Majority Leader, of the Pennsylvania House of Representatives. He represented the 62nd District, made up of parts of Indiana County. In November 2014, Reed was elected House Majority Leader and assumed those duties on December 1. He was sworn into his seventh term on January 6, 2015.

== Biography ==
=== Early life ===
Reed was born David Leroy Reed in Blairsville, Pennsylvania. He attended and graduated from Homer-Center High School, where he played football and baseball. After high school, Reed attended Indiana University of Pennsylvania, receiving a bachelor's degree in mathematics/economics. He later earned a master's degree in government administration from the University of Pennsylvania. Reed completed an internship in the Governor's Policy Office for Community and Economic Development in Harrisburg, Pennsylvania. He also coordinated special projects for the Indiana County Chamber of Commerce and worked as a director of a business-development group for Blairsville, Pennsylvania.

=== Pennsylvania House of Representatives ===
In 2002, the 24-year-old Reed challenged Representative Sara Steelman for the 62nd legislative district, winning an upset. Both candidates made improving the local economic climate part of their platforms. Reed was inspired to challenge Steelman after seeing fellow 20-something Jeff Coleman defeat another long-term Democrat in the adjacent 60th legislative district. As a challenger, Reed followed the campaign blueprint established in 2000 by when young Jeff Coleman defeated Tim Pesci in nearby Armstrong County. Coleman personally assisted Reed in his campaign, from recruiting campaign help to advising him on his campaign statements.

The political news site PoliticsPA named Reed's campaign website the "sixth best website" in Pennsylvania during the election season. During the campaign, Steelman "erupted" on the district's airwaves with taxpayer-funded "public service announcements" for the first time in a decade. His website was praised by PoliticsPA as being among the best in that election cycle. With the 57-43 victory, Reed became the youngest member of the House. Coleman had previously held that distinction.

In 2003, the political website PoliticsPA named him to "The Best of the Freshman Class" list, saying that "What he lacks in practical experience, Reed more than makes up for with hard work."

=== U.S. congressional campaign ===
In January 2018, Reed announced he would campaign for the United States Congress in Pennsylvania's 9th congressional district after Bill Shuster announced he would not run for re-election in 2018. However, he ended his campaign several months later when the Supreme Court of Pennsylvania ruled the current district maps illegal and established new district maps. The new maps placed Reed's residence in Indiana, Pennsylvania in a new 15th congressional district alongside current Representative Glenn Thompson.

=== Personal life ===
Reed is married to the former Heather Camp, whom he met during his first election campaign. They have a son and two daughters, and reside in White Township, Pennsylvania.

Pennsylvania House of Representatives
Preceded by Mike Turzai	Majority Leader of the Pennsylvania House of Representatives; 2015–2018	Succeeded by Bryan Cutler
