= West Lebanon, Pennsylvania =

Unincorporated community in Pennsylvania, U.S.

Coordinates: 40°36′08″N 79°21′14″W

West Lebanon is an unincorporated community, founded in 1839, in northern Young Township, Indiana County, Pennsylvania, United States. Its altitude is 1,309 feet (399 m). It has a post office with the ZIP code 15783.

Old State Rt. 56 passes through West Lebanon. West Lebanon is situated between Elder's Ridge and Shelocta.

West Lebanon was formerly an independent school district. It then merged with the Elder's Ridge school district, which then merged to form the Apollo-Ridge school district. West Lebanon remains in the Apollo-Ridge school district today.

West Lebanon is surrounded by towns such as Iselin, McIntire, Harttown, and Whiskey Run, all of which were founded as coal mining towns. Whiskey Run, now a ghost town, is especially famous for its many unsolved murders in the early 20th century.

West Lebanon has its own baseball team, which plays at Bertolino Park. The team has won the most championships in the ICL, recently winning 11 championships in a row.

West Lebanon also has a historic cemetery, with graves dating back to the early 19th century.

West Lebanon contains two churches and a fire station. Many methane wells are beginning operation in the West Lebanon, as well as in the surrounding area.
