= Coral, Pennsylvania =

Unincorporated community in Pennsylvania, US

- Census-designated place
- Location within Pennsylvania Location within the United States
- Coordinates: 40°30′08″N 79°10′28″W
- Country: United States
- State: Pennsylvania
- County: Indiana
- Township: Center

Area
  - Total: 0.18 sq mi (0.46 km^{2})
  - Land: 0.18 sq mi (0.46 km^{2})
  - Water: 0.0039 sq mi (0.01 km^{2})
- Elevation: 1,066 ft (325 m)

Population (2020)
  - Total: 288
  - Density: 1,631.1/sq mi (629.77/km^{2})
- Time zone: UTC-5 (Eastern (EST))
  - Summer (DST): UTC-4 (EDT)
- ZIP code: 15731
- FIPS code: 42-16136
- GNIS feature ID: 2634210

Coral is a census-designated place located in Center Township, Indiana County, Pennsylvania, United States. The community is located between the borough of Homer City and the community of Black Lick on U.S. Route 119. It is bordered to the north by Graceton. As of the 2010 census the population of Coral was 325.

== Demographics ==
Historical population
Census	Pop.	Note	%±
2020	288		—
U.S. Decennial Census
