= Frank E. Moore =

American politician (1933–2019)

Member of the Pennsylvania House of Representatives from the 62nd district
- In office 1969–1970
- Preceded by: District created
- Succeeded by: William Rodger Shane

Personal details
- Born: December 18, 1933 Rochester Mills, Pennsylvania
- Died: April 1, 2019 (aged 85) Indiana, Pennsylvania
- Party: Republican
- Spouse: Peggy Moore
- Education: Marion Center High School

Frank E. Moore (December 18, 1933 – April 1, 2019) was an American politician.

Moore was born on December 19, 1933, in Rochester Mills, Pennsylvania, and attended Marion Center High School. He was a justice of the peace between 1957 and 1961. Moore then served as treasurer of Indiana County from 1966 to 1970. He was a member of the Pennsylvania House of Representatives from District 62 between 1968 and 1970. Moore died on April 1, 2019, aged 85.
