= Sig Broskie =

American baseball player

- Catcher
- Born: March 23, 1911; Iselin, Pennsylvania, U.S.
- Died: May 17, 1975 (aged 64); Canton, Ohio, U.S.
- Batted: Right Threw: Right

MLB debut
- September 11, 1940, for the Boston Bees

Last MLB appearance
- September 29, 1940, for the Boston Bees

MLB statistics
- Batting average: .273
- Home runs: 0
- Runs batted in: 4
- Stats at Baseball Reference

Teams
- Boston Bees (1940)

Sigmund Theodore "Chops" Broskie (March 23, 1911 – May 17, 1975) was an American Major League Baseball (MLB) catcher. He played one season with the Boston Bees for the month of September in 1940.

Broskie was a batterymate of Warren Spahn on the 1941 Evansville Bees. Broskie's veteran leadership was influential on the young pitcher who would go on to become a Hall of Famer.

Broskie's playing career ended in 1942 when he enlisted in the United States Navy.

In 1949, he and his wife, then living in Canton, Ohio, adopted a boy.
