= Graceton, Pennsylvania =

Unincorporated community in Pennsylvania, US

- Census-designated place
- Location within Pennsylvania Location within the United States
- Coordinates: 40°30′25″N 79°10′07″W
- Country: United States
- State: Pennsylvania
- County: Indiana
- Township: Center

Area
  - Total: 0.12 sq mi (0.31 km^{2})
  - Land: 0.12 sq mi (0.31 km^{2})
  - Water: 0 sq mi (0.00 km^{2})
- Elevation: 1,096 ft (334 m)

Population (2020)
  - Total: 211
  - Density: 1,737.4/sq mi (670.82/km^{2})
- Time zone: UTC-5 (Eastern (EST))
  - Summer (DST): UTC-4 (EDT)
- FIPS code: 42-30224
- GNIS feature ID: 2634231

Graceton is a census-designated place located in Center Township, Indiana County in the state of Pennsylvania, United States. The community is located between the borough of Homer City and the community of Black Lick on U.S. Route 119. It is also located less than a mile from the other CDP of Coral. As of the 2010 census, the population was 257 residents.

== Demographics ==
Historical population
Census	Pop.	Note	%±
2020	211		—
U.S. Decennial Census
