= Red Tramback =

American baseball player (1915-1979)

- Outfielder
- Born: October 1, 1915; Iselin, Pennsylvania
- Died: December 28, 1979 (aged 64); Albany, New York
- Batted: Left Threw: Left

MLB debut
- September 15, 1940, for the New York Giants

Last MLB appearance
- September 16, 1940, for the New York Giants

MLB statistics
- Games played: 2
- At bats: 4
- Hits: 1
- Stats at Baseball Reference

Teams
- New York Giants (1940)

Stephen Joseph "Red" Tramback (October 1, 1915 – December 28, 1979) was an outfielder in Major League Baseball. He played for the New York Giants.
