= William Rodger Shane =

American politician

Member of the Pennsylvania House of Representatives from the 62nd district
- In office 1971–1976
- Preceded by: Frank E. Moore
- Succeeded by: Paul Wass

Personal details
- Born: October 1, 1935 Indiana, Pennsylvania
- Died: October 4, 2012 (aged 77) Bedford, Pennsylvania, United States
- Party: Democratic

William Rodger Shane (October 1, 1935 – October 4, 2012) was a Democratic member of the Pennsylvania House of Representatives.

== Early life and career ==
Shane was born and raised in Indiana, Pennsylvania; the son of Joseph and Jean (née Bell) Shane. He and his wife Esther would go on to have three children, Susan, Mark, and Joseph.

Shane graduated from Indiana Area High School in 1953, where he was a standout on the high school football squad and named to the all-county football team. He earned a degree in economics from Harvard and received a law degree in 1961 from the University of Pennsylvania Law School.

Shane was a criminology professor at Indiana University of Pennsylvania in 1968 when he got involved in the Citizens for Gene McCarthy presidential campaign.

=== State representative ===
In 1970, Shane's friends convinced him to run for state representative. He and his supporters began an extensive campaign, working on Saturdays and weekdays after working at IUP. He defeated Frank Moore in the November election.

=== Public Utility Commission ===
After serving three terms in the 62nd District of the House, Shane served on the Public Utility Commission from 1984 to 1990 and was its chairman during his final three years.

=== Public image ===
Shane, who was known for his tireless efforts towards public service, was often confrontational with colleagues. This became public in 2003 after Shane was sworn into a seat on the Indiana County Board of Commissioners to fill a vacancy created by the departure of commissioner Jim McQuown. Shane was criticized publicly by fellow commissioner Randy Degenkolb for his aggressive demeanor towards county workers who he felt were not giving the county full taxpayer value on their services as employees. Shane admitted to this hard-line approach, and both men made amends, but Degenkolb later resigned his seat.

A tall, physically imposing figure who competed 14 marathons, Shane also was known for his dry wit, especially during campaign ads. He often described himself as 'the big bald guy with the bowtie,' with the tie frequently appearing under his name on campaign signs. Shane wore a bowtie and flat cap during much of his professional life.

== Death ==
Shane died October 4, 2012, while traveling east along the Pennsylvania Turnpike near the town of Breezewood, Pennsylvania. His vehicle traveled off the roadway, struck an embankment and overturned. His wife Esther, who was in the vehicle with him, was treated for non-life-threatening injuries, including a broken wrist, at UPMC Memorial Hospital in Bedford. Shane died of blunt force trauma injuries.
