= James Struzzi =

American politician

James B. Struzzi II

Member of the Pennsylvania House of Representatives from the 62nd district
- Incumbent
- Assumed office December 1, 2018
- Preceded by: Dave L. Reed

Personal details
- Born: September 23, 1967 (age 59) Jeannette, Pennsylvania, U.S.
- Party: Republican
- Spouse: Christina
- Children: 4, Aviana, Talan, Zarek, and Vaughn.
- Education: Indiana University of Pennsylvania and University of Pittsburgh at Greensburg
- Website: www.repstruzzi.com

James B. Struzzi II (born 1967) is an American politician. He has served as a Republican member of the Pennsylvania House of Representatives, representing the 62nd district since December 1, 2018.

== Personal life and education ==
James Struzzi II is a son of James Struzzi I and Anna Mae Struzzi. He had a brother, Michael, and a sister, Melissa. Struzzi graduated from Penn-Trafford High School in 1985, and attended the University of Pittsburgh where he earned a degree in English writing and communication. James Struzzi II is married to Christina, with whom he has four children, Aviana, Talan, Zarek, and Vaughn.

== Political career ==
Struzzi began working for the Pennsylvania Department of Transportation in 1999, as the community relations coordinator in District 10. He later became assistant press secretary for the Pittsburgh region of District 11. In 2013, Struzzi resigned from the PennDOT to succeed Dana Henry as the president of the Indiana County chamber of commerce. Struzzi announced in February 2018 that he was seeking the Republican Party nomination to succeed Dave L. Reed as member of the Pennsylvania House of Representatives in District 62. Struzzi faced Democratic Party nominee Logan Dellafiora as well as write-in candidate Daniel Wilson in the general election. Struzzi sought reelection in 2020, and will face Democratic candidate Dennis Semsick and independent Laura Thomas in the general election.

=== Committee assignments ===
- Appropriations
- Children & Youth
- Human Services
- Insurance
