= Quasi-legislative capacity =

Non-legislative governmental bodies making rules and regulations

A quasi-legislative capacity is that in which a public administrative agency or body acts when it makes rules and regulations. When an administrative agency exercises its rule-making authority, it is said to act in a quasi-legislative manner. Administrative agencies acquire this authority to make rules and regulations that affect legal rights through statutes. This authority is an exception to the general principle that laws affecting rights should be passed only by elected lawmakers.

== Overview ==
Administrative agency rules are made only with the permission of elected lawmakers, and elected lawmakers may strike down an administrative rule or even eliminate an agency. In this sense quasi-legislative activity occurs at the discretion of elected officials. Nevertheless, administrative agencies create and enforce many legal rules on their own, often without the advice of lawmakers, and the rules have the force of law. This means they have a binding effect on the general public.

Examples of quasi-legislative actions abound. Dozens of administrative agencies exist on the federal level, and dozens more exist on the state and local levels, and most of them have the authority to make rules that affect substantive rights. Agencies with authority over environmental matters may pass rules that restrict the rights of property owners to alter or build on their land; departments of revenue may pass rules that affect how much tax a person pays; and local housing agencies may set and enforce standards on health and safety in housing. These are just a few of the myriad rules passed by administrative agencies.

The United Nations General Assembly has been described as a quasi-legislative body, seen through the adoption of Security Council Resolution 1540.

Except where prohibited by statute or judicial precedent, quasi-legislative activity may be challenged in a court of law. Generally, a person challenging quasi-legislative activity must wait until the rule-making process is complete and the rule or regulation is set before challenging it. Moreover, a challenge to an agency's rule or regulation usually must be made first to the agency itself. If no satisfaction is received from the agency, the complainant can then challenge the rule or regulation in a court of law.

Another distinctive feature of quasi-legislative activity is the provision of notice and a hearing. When an administrative agency intends to pass or change a rule that affects substantive legal rights, it usually must provide notice of this intent and hold a public hearing. This gives members of the public a voice in the quasi-legislative activity.

== See also ==
- Administrative law
- Bureaucracy
