= Door prize =

Award item

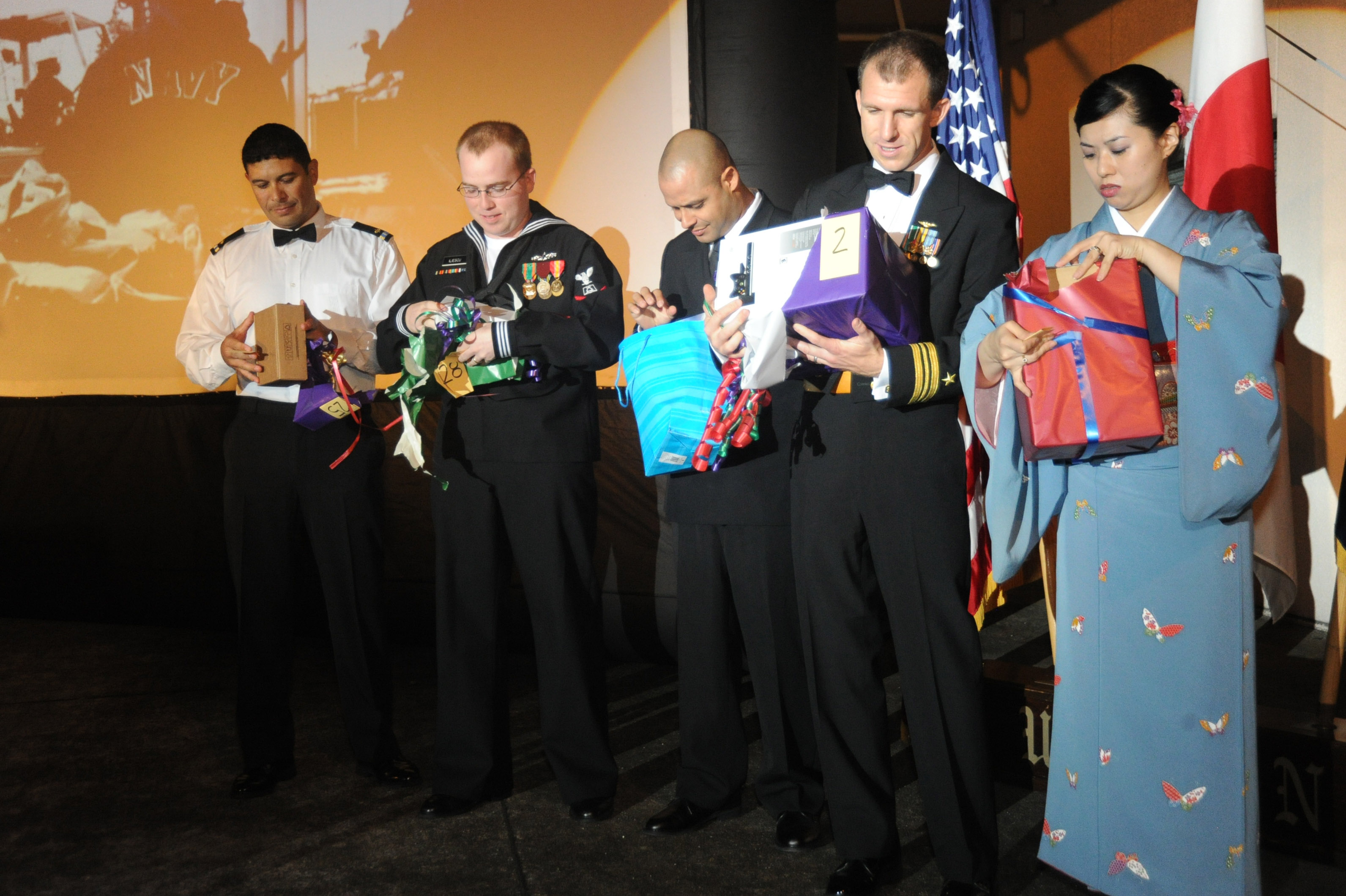
Door prize winners open their gifts during the Navy Ball at the Officer's Club at Naval Air Facility Atsugi.

A door prize refers to a prize or gift given to people who attend a meeting, party, event, etc., especially one which is given on a random basis to one or some of the attendees.

== History and etymology ==
The phrase "door prize" refers to a type of prize where the entering of the contest is accomplished by walking through the door. In most of these situations, participants will pay a small amount of money to come into a dance or convention, and then participants are given tickets. At some point the organizer will pick a matching ticket from a pot. If no one claims the prize, they will pick another ticket. While it is unclear when this practice was first implemented, the first documentation of the practice is found in The Carpet Trade in 1867. This practice became popular in the United States of America in the 1950s, during the growth of the American consumer society following World War II.
