= Center Township, Indiana County, Pennsylvania =

Township in Pennsylvania, US

- Township
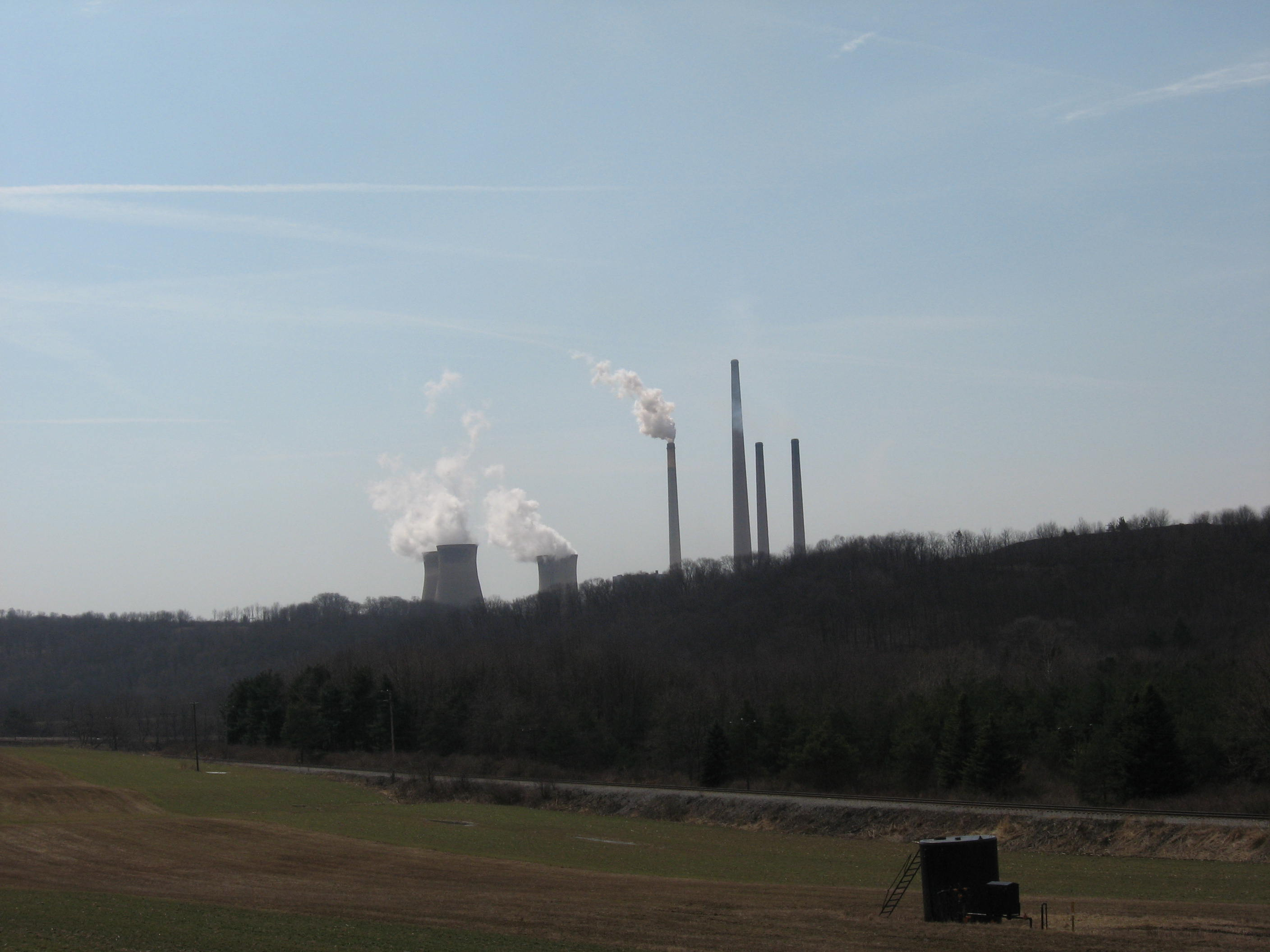
- View of the Homer City Generating Station from Cherry Run Road in Center Township

- Seal

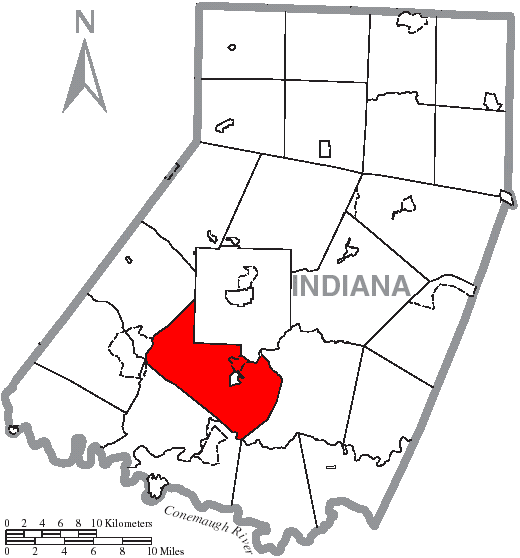
- Map of Indiana County, Pennsylvania, highlighting Center Township

- Map of Pennsylvania highlighting Indiana County
- Coordinates: 40°32′36″N 79°11′6″W
- Country: United States
- State: Pennsylvania
- County: Indiana
- Established: 1807

Area
  - Total: 40.61 sq mi (105.19 km^{2})
  - Land: 40.17 sq mi (104.04 km^{2})
  - Water: 0.45 sq mi (1.16 km^{2})
- Elevation: 348 ft (106 m)

Population (2020)
  - Total: 4,443 ▼
  - Estimate (2021): 4,424
  - Density: 113/sq mi (43.7/km^{2})
- Time zone: UTC-5 (EST)
  - Summer (DST): UTC-4 (EDT)
- Area code: 724
- FIPS code: 42-063-12040
- Website: center-twp.com

Center Township is a township in Indiana County, Pennsylvania, United States. The population was 4,443 at the 2020 census. It includes the communities of Aultman, Coral, Coy, Coy Junction, Edgewood, Graceton, Lucerne Mines, Luciusboro, Roberts Addition, Red Barn, Tearing Run, Tide, Two Licks, and Waterman. The borough surrounds, but does not include, the borough of Homer City.

== Geography ==
According to the United States Census Bureau, the township has a total area of 40.5 square miles (105 km^{2}), of which 40.4 square miles (105 km^{2}) is land and 0.1 square miles (0.26 km^{2}) (0.25%) is water.

== History ==
Center Township was created in 1807 from parts of Armstrong Township, Indiana County. It was named for its position within the county. The first election was held at Peter Sutton's house in Indiana.

The Homer City Generating Station, owned by Edison Mission Energy, is located within Center Township. The township is also home to the oldest church in Indiana County, Bethel Presbyterian Church.

== Demographics ==
Historical population
Census	Pop.	Note	%±
1850	1,193		—
1860	1,397		17.1%
1870	1,555		11.3%
1880	1,265		−18.6%
1890	1,387		9.6%
1900	1,500		8.1%
1910	3,124		108.3%
1920	7,521		140.7%
1930	6,898		−8.3%
1940	6,898		0.0%
1950	6,215		−9.9%
1960	5,595		−10.0%
1970	5,255		−6.1%
1980	5,475		4.2%
1990	5,257		−4.0%
2000	4,876		−7.2%
2010	4,764		−2.3%
2020	4,443		−6.7%
2021 (est.)	4,424		−0.4%
U.S. Decennial Census

As of the census of 2000, there were 4,876 people, 2,024 households, and 1,455 families residing in the township. The population density was 120.8 inhabitants per square mile (46.6/km^{2}). There were 2,132 housing units at an average density of 52.8 per square mile (20.4/km^{2}). The racial makeup of the township was 98.95% White, 0.51% African American, 0.10% Native American, 0.12% Asian, 0.08% from other races, and 0.23% from two or more races. Hispanic or Latino of any race were 0.45% of the population.

There were 2,024 households, out of which 25.9% had children under the age of 18 living with them, 58.4% were married couples living together, 9.8% had a female householder with no husband present, and 28.1% were non-families. 24.7% of all households were made up of individuals, and 12.5% had someone living alone who was 65 years of age or older. The average household size was 2.41 and the average family size was 2.86.

In the township the population was spread out, with 20.7% under the age of 18, 7.5% from 18 to 24, 27.2% from 25 to 44, 26.6% from 45 to 64, and 18.0% who were 65 years of age or older. The median age was 42 years. For every 100 females, there were 98.3 males. For every 100 females age 18 and over, there were 94.5 males.

The median income for a household in the township was $32,311, and the median income for a family was $36,563. Males had a median income of $30,997 versus $20,472 for females. The per capita income for the township was $16,891. About 7.3% of families and 9.0% of the population were below the poverty line, including 13.6% of those under age 18 and 3.9% of those age 65 or over.
