= Keg registration =

Beer keg registration requirements by states

Beer keg registration is a legal requirement in some U.S. states and localities that identification tags or labels be affixed to beer kegs upon retail sale. They often consist of requirements that tags and records retained by the retailer list the name and address of the purchaser, the date and location where the beer will be served, and other information. These laws vary widely in their specifics and enforcement. There appears to have been little academic study of the efficacy of beer keg registration laws.

== List of American states with beer keg registration laws ==
- Arkansas
- California – seven US gallons (26 L) or more
- Connecticut
- District of Columbia
- Georgia
- Idaho
- Indiana
- Iowa
- Kansas
- Kentucky
- Maryland
- Massachusetts
- Minnesota
- Missouri
- Montana
- Nebraska
- New Hampshire
- New Mexico
- New York – four US gallons (15 L) or more
- North Carolina
- North Dakota
- Ohio
- Oregon – six US gallons (23 L) or more
- Rhode Island
- South Carolina
- Vermont
- Virginia
- Washington – four US gallons (15 L) or more

The state of Utah does not have a keg registration law, but requires keg users to buy a temporary beer permit, and limits kegs to low-alcohol beer only.
