= McIntyre, Pennsylvania =

Unincorporated community in Pennsylvania, US

- Unincorporated community
- Location within Pennsylvania Location within the United States
- Coordinates: 40°34′11″N 79°17′44″W
- Country: United States
- State: Pennsylvania
- County: Indiana
- Township: Young
- Elevation: 1,168 ft (356 m)
- Time zone: UTC-5 (Eastern (EST))
  - Summer (DST): UTC-4 (EDT)
- ZIP code: 15756
- Area code: 724
- GNIS feature ID: 1180730

McIntyre is an unincorporated community in Young Township, Indiana County, Pennsylvania, United States. The community is 8.3 miles (13.4 km) west-southwest of Indiana. McIntyre has a post office, with ZIP code 15756.
