= Lucerne Mines, Pennsylvania =

Unincorporated community in Pennsylvania, US

- Census-designated place
- Lucernemines
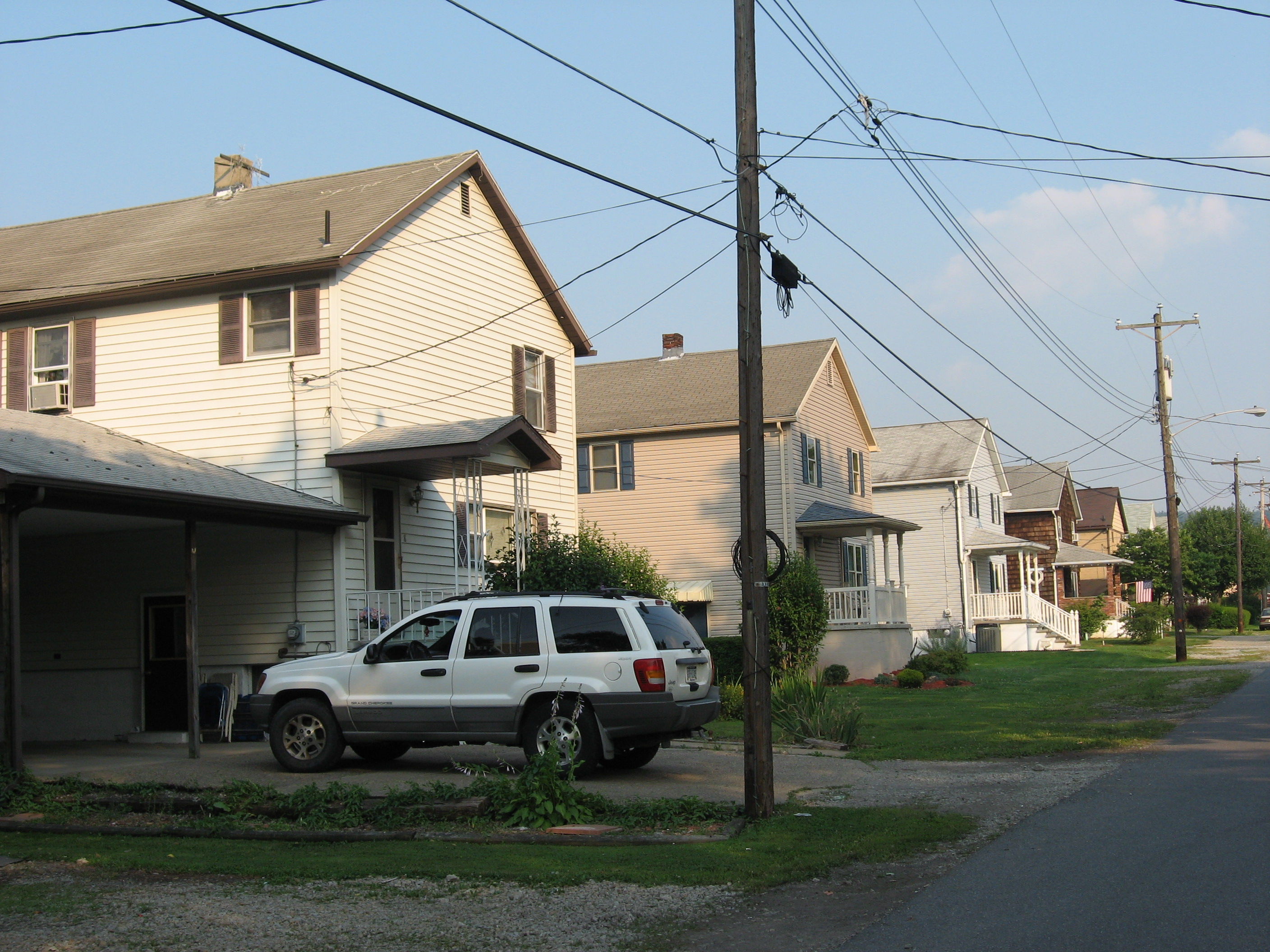
- Neighborhood in Lucerne Mines, 2008

- Location within Pennsylvania Location within the United States
- Coordinates: 40°33′16″N 79°9′20″W
- Country: United States
- State: Pennsylvania
- County: Indiana
- Township: Center

Area
  - Total: 0.84 sq mi (2.18 km^{2})
  - Land: 0.84 sq mi (2.17 km^{2})
  - Water: 0.0039 sq mi (0.01 km^{2})

Population (2020)
  - Total: 892
  - Density: 1,062.6/sq mi (410.26/km^{2})
- Time zone: UTC-5 (Eastern (EST))
  - Summer (DST): UTC-4 (EDT)
- ZIP code: 15754
- FIPS code: 42-45312

Lucernemines, usually written as Lucerne Mines, is a census-designated place (CDP) in Indiana County, Pennsylvania, United States. The population was 937 at the 2010 census.

== Geography ==
Lucerne Mines is located at 40°33′16″N 79°9′20″W (40.554447, -79.155584).

According to the United States Census Bureau, the CDP has a total area of 0.9 square miles (2.3 km^{2}), all land.

== Demographics ==
Historical population
Census	Pop.	Note	%±
2020	892		—
U.S. Decennial Census

As of the census of 2000, there were 951 people, 407 households, and 293 families residing in the CDP. The population density was 1,105.8 inhabitants per square mile (427.0/km^{2}). There were 427 housing units at an average density of 496.5 per square mile (191.7/km^{2}). The racial makeup of the CDP was 98.63% White, 1.05% African American, 0.11% Asian, and 0.21% from two or more races. Hispanic or Latino of any race were 0.84% of the population.

There were 407 households, out of which 23.1% had children under the age of 18 living with them, 57.2% were married couples living together, 10.8% had a female householder with no husband present, and 27.8% were non-families. 25.3% of all households were made up of individuals, and 15.5% had someone living alone who was 65 years of age or older. The average household size was 2.33 and the average family size was 2.76.

In the CDP the population was spread out, with 19.1% under the age of 18, 6.1% from 18 to 24, 27.8% from 25 to 44, 23.4% from 45 to 64, and 23.6% who were 65 years of age or older. The median age was 43 years. For every 100 females there were 94.9 males. For every 100 females age 18 and over, there were 93.2 males.

The median income for a household in the CDP was $28,427, and the median income for a family was $33,580. Males had a median income of $26,719 versus $18,036 for females. The per capita income for the CDP was $13,976. About 10.4% of families and 10.4% of the population were below the poverty line, including 14.5% of those under age 18 and 4.1% of those age 65 or over.
