= Iselin, Pennsylvania =

Unincorporated community in Pennsylvania, US

- Unincorporated community
- Location within Pennsylvania Location within the United States
- Coordinates: 40°33′34″N 79°23′11″W
- Country: United States
- State: Pennsylvania
- County: Indiana
- Township: Young
- Elevation: 1,217 ft (371 m)
- Time zone: UTC-5 (Eastern (EST))
  - Summer (DST): UTC-4 (EDT)
- Area codes: 724, 878
- GNIS feature ID: 1177876

Iselin, Pennsylvania Iselin is an unincorporated community and census-designated place located in Young Township, Indiana County, Pennsylvania, United States. Situated in the bituminous coal region of western Pennsylvania, it originated during the early 20th century industrial expansion as a planned patch town.History and CreationAt the turn of the 20th century, the rapid expansion of American steel, manufacturing, and rail transport created an unprecedented demand for bituminous coal. In response to this economic boom, Indiana County became a prime target for resource development. In November 1902, Lucius Robinson, president of the Rochester & Pittsburgh Coal and Iron Company (R&PC&I), established a subsidiary called the Pittsburgh Gas Coal Company. The corporation acquired roughly 6,000 acres of coal-rich land in Young Township.The site was strategically selected to become a massive, self-contained company-owned mining camp. By August 1903, the company opened its first two drift mines. To lodge the massive influx of workers required for production, the company contracted the Hyde-Murphy Company to build a planned residential patch town. The community was officially named Iselin to honor Adrian Georg Iselin, a prominent New York banker who served as the primary financier and chief stockholder for the R&PC&I coal operations.

Iselin is an unincorporated community in Young Township, Indiana County, Pennsylvania, United States.

== Notable people ==
- Sig Broskie (1911–1975), Catcher for the Boston Bees.
- Red Tramback (1915–1979), Outfielder for the New York Giants.
- Metro Persoskie (1921–1944), Minor league baseball player. Died in service during World War II.
- Paul Wass (1925–2020), Pennsylvania state legislator and businessman, was born in Iselin.
