= Helvetia, Pennsylvania =

Former community in Pennsylvania, US

Coordinates: 41°02′52″N 78°46′26″W

Helvetia, located in Brady Township in Clearfield County, Pennsylvania, United States, was a company mining town that was purchased by the R&P in 1896. The Helvetia Mine quickly became one of the largest producers in the region, dominating the Reynoldsville coalfield for many years. The company town lasted from 1891 to 1947. Schools, churches and stores were built for the families of the miners, and to this day a small population still live in Helvetia. The town had three periods of ownership; Adrian Iselin built the town and started commercial operations at the mine c. 1890–1891; during the second period of ownership, from 1896 to 1947, management and operations at Helvetia were under the direct control of the R&P; in 1947, the R&P sold all of its company towns, including Helvetia, to the Kovalchick Salvage Company. The mine was permanently closed in 1954.

Helvetia is an ancient name for Switzerland.

== Early Helvetia ==
What drew investors to this portion of Brady Township was a vast, six-foot coal seam lying just beneath the surface of cultivated fields and timber stands. Lands and mineral rights in this portion of Brady Township—some 7,000 to 8,000 acres (2,800 to 3,200 ha)—were secretly purchased and consolidated in the late 1880s and early 1890s by Adrian Iselin, a New York investment banker. The Helvetia Mine was owned exclusively by Iselin and operated independently of the R&P until 1896, when it was joined to other R&P holdings. Thus it was Adrian Iselin who first put his stamp on the company town, not the R&P. After Helvetia opened, Iselin and the R&P seem to have acted cooperatively in a number of matters regarding wages, transportation rates, and mining and coking operations at Helvetia between 1891 and 1896.

The mine was serviced via the Mahoning Valley Railroad, a one-and-three-quarter-mile-long spur built by Adrian Iselin to connect with the BR&P rail network at Stanley. The R&P often used the BR&P line to run special cars for company officials traveling to Helvetia, but it is not likely that the BR&P transported miners, except for newly recruited hands who were conveyed to the mine by rail from cities on the eastern seaboard. Travel to Helvetia was difficult for the common miner until first Stanley then Helvetia were linked to the streetcar system connecting DuBois and Sykesville around 1906. The advent of the motorcar made little difference to Helvetia families until the 1920s, when automobiles became more affordable. Helvetia's residents, then, were largely dependent on their employers for services during the mine's earliest years of operations.

The surviving Helvetia ledger, local tax records, and several pieces of correspondence make it clear that Adrian Iselin began construction of the coal plant, offices, worker housing, the company store, and other town facilities in late 1890. Iselin was eager to begin production, and his correspondence shows that the mine was operating by early 1891, while tonnage records indicate the mine was producing well by 1892. Construction of the power plant began in March 1891 and the town waterworks in September of that year. By 1892, the industrial plant for the mine had grown considerably to include a blacksmith shop, a general office building, a steam saw and shingle mill, the powerhouse and its related machinery, and the tipple. A weigh office and scale were added in 1895.

Coke ovens were apparently built as part of the coal plant in 1892, though no mention of the ovens can be found in the tax records until 1895 when the assessor noted that 28 ovens were located on site. The local DuBois paper stated, however, that construction was scheduled to begin in the late spring or summer of 1892. In June of that same year, the newspaper noted that work on the coke ovens was progressing and that "Helvetia will soon be sending her light heavenward to mark her location as well as her sister mining towns."

Iselin did not neglect provisions for his employees, as the coal mining operation got under way at Helvetia. Construction of the company town seems to have begun almost immediately. Iselin's ledger book shows rental income for the first time on February 28, 1891, for a modest $52.07 for the month, while Helvetia Supply Co. stocks sale reached $351.64 for the same period. Indeed, records indicate that the bulk of Helvetia's housing and many of the town's facilities were built between 1890 and 1896 under Iselin's direction. Sixty-two miners' double houses and 10 single houses, or 134 total units, were built for the company town under Iselin's tenure, beginning in November 1890. Assessment records show that 41 double-block houses and 10 single houses were complete by May 1892. Listed separately from all of these structures in 1892 and in subsequent tax rolls are two dwelling houses, one for the engineer and one for the superintendent of the mine. Finally, Iselin's correspondence indicates that a brick house, known as the Haskal Mansion, was built for the manager of the mines. Fifteen new double houses were assessed in 1893, bringing the number of miner's dwellings to 56.
