= Young Township, Indiana County, Pennsylvania =

Township in Pennsylvania, US

Coordinates: 40°35′52″N 79°19′09″W

- Township
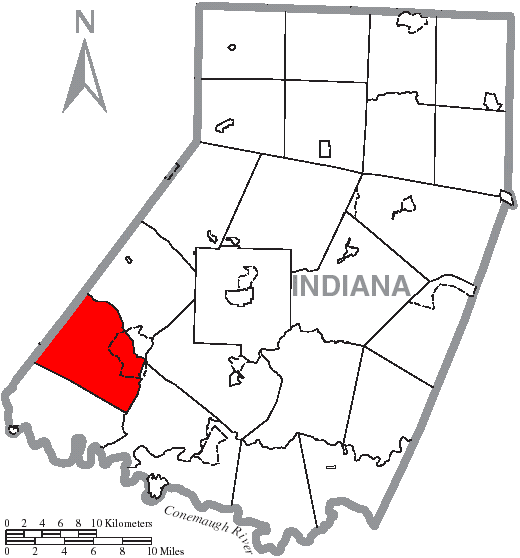
- Map of Indiana County, Pennsylvania Highlighting Young Township

- Map of Pennsylvania highlighting Indiana County
- Country: United States
- State: Pennsylvania
- County: Indiana

Area
  - Total: 34.84 sq mi (90.23 km^{2})
  - Land: 34.78 sq mi (90.07 km^{2})
  - Water: 0.062 sq mi (0.16 km^{2})

Population (2020)
  - Total: 1,709 ▼
  - Estimate (2021): 1,701
  - Density: 48/sq mi (18.7/km^{2})
- Time zone: UTC-5 (Eastern (EST))
  - Summer (DST): UTC-4 (EDT)
- FIPS code: 42-063-87160
- Website: https://youngtownship.com/

Young Township is a township that is located in Indiana County, Pennsylvania, United States. It was named after John Young, the first president judge of Indiana county.

The population was 1,709 at the time of the 2020 census. It includes the communities of Clarksburg, Coal Run (or Clune), Elders Ridge, Iselin, McIntyre, Scotland, Watson's Ridge, and West Lebanon, along with the "ghost towns" of Hart Town, Whiskey Run and Nesbitt Run.

== Geography ==
According to the United States Census Bureau, the township has a total area of 34.8 square miles (90.3 km^{2}), of which 34.8 square miles (90.2 km^{2}) is land and 0.03% is water. It contains part of the census-designated place of Jacksonville.

== Demographics ==
Historical population
Census	Pop.	Note	%±
1850	1,513		—
1860	1,630		7.7%
1870	1,650		1.2%
1880	1,376		−16.6%
1890	1,238		−10.0%
1900	1,089		−12.0%
1910	3,751		244.4%
1920	4,298		14.6%
1930	3,872		−9.9%
1940	3,795		−2.0%
1950	2,984		−21.4%
1960	2,272		−23.9%
1970	1,809		−20.4%
1980	2,043		12.9%
1990	1,805		−11.6%
2000	1,744		−3.4%
2010	1,775		1.8%
2020	1,709		−3.7%
2021 (est.)	1,701		−0.5%
U.S. Decennial Census

As of the census of 2000, there were 1,744 people, 741 households, and 489 families residing in the township.

The population density was 50.1 inhabitants per square mile (19.3/km^{2}). There were 805 housing units at an average density of 23.1/sq mi (8.9/km^{2}).

The racial makeup of the township was 98.85% White, 0.46% African American, 0.17% Native American, 0.06% Asian, and 0.46% from two or more races.

There were 741 households, out of which 27.9% had children under the age of eighteen living with them; 53.3% were married couples living together, 7.7% had a female householder with no husband present, and 33.9% were non-families. 30.4% of all households were made up of individuals, and 16.6% had someone living alone who was sixty-five years of age or older.

The average household size was 2.35 and the average family size was 2.94.

Within the township, the population was spread out, with 22.7% of residents who were under the age of eighteen, 8.0% who were aged eighteen to twenty-four, 28.2% who were aged twenty-five to forty-four, 24.1% who were aged forty-five to sixty-four, and 17.1% who were sixty-five years of age or older. The median age was forty years.

For every one hundred females, there were 94.0 males. For every one hundred females who were aged eighteen or older, there were 91.7 males.

The median income for a household in the township was $29,871, and the median income for a family was $38,750. Males had a median income of $31,250 compared with that of $20,625 for females.

The per capita income for the township was $15,367.

Approximately 10.2% of families and 13.6% of the population were living below the poverty line, including 23.0% of those who were under the age of eighteen and 6.9% of those aged sixty-five or older.
