= Joseph Ware House =

- U.S. National Register of Historic Places
- New Jersey Register of Historic Places
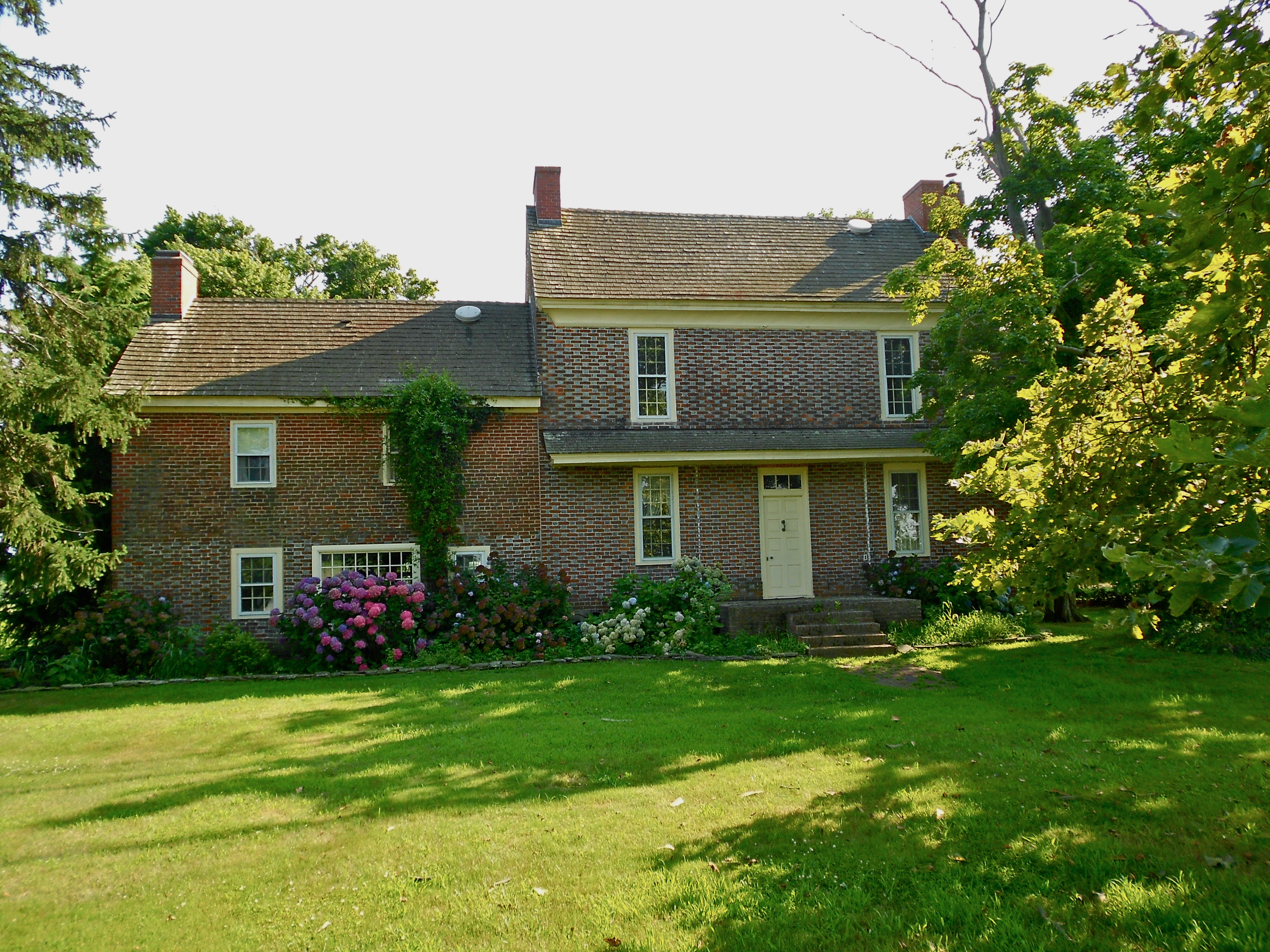

- Location within Salem County, New Jersey Location within New Jersey Location within the United States
- Location: 134 Poplar Street; Hancock's Bridge, New Jersey
- Coordinates: 39°30′21″N 75°29′09″W
- Area: 5.4 acres (2.2 ha)
- Built: c. 1730, 1758
- Architectural style: Georgian
- NRHP reference No.: 89002418
- NJRHP No.: 2434

Significant dates
- Added to NRHP: January 26, 1990
- Designated NJRHP: December 15, 1989

The Joseph Ware House, also known as the Joshua Thompson House and the Ware–Shourds House, is a historic house located at 134 Poplar Street in the Hancock's Bridge section of Lower Alloways Creek Township in Salem County, New Jersey. It was added to the National Register of Historic Places on January 26, 1990, for its significance in architecture, exploration/settlement, literature, military history, and politics/government.

== History and description ==
In 1711, Joseph Ware Jr. (1684–1754) inherited the land and property from his father. According to local historian Thomas Shourds (1805–1891), he built a house here c. 1730. His second son, Solomon Ware, inherited the house in 1754 and built a one-story brick addition in 1758. His daughter Sarah Ware inherited it in 1765. She married Joshua Thompson in 1773. On March 21, 1778, Judge William Hancock Jr. was mortally wounded at nearby Hancock House and later died here. The judge married Sarah Thompson, Joshua's sister. Next, Joshua's oldest son, Joseph Thompson bought the house from him. Joseph's daughter Sarah Thompson inherited the property and later married Shourds in 1828.

== See also ==
- National Register of Historic Places listings in Salem County, New Jersey
- List of the oldest buildings in New Jersey
