= Buckley's Serenaders =

Blackface minstrel troupe

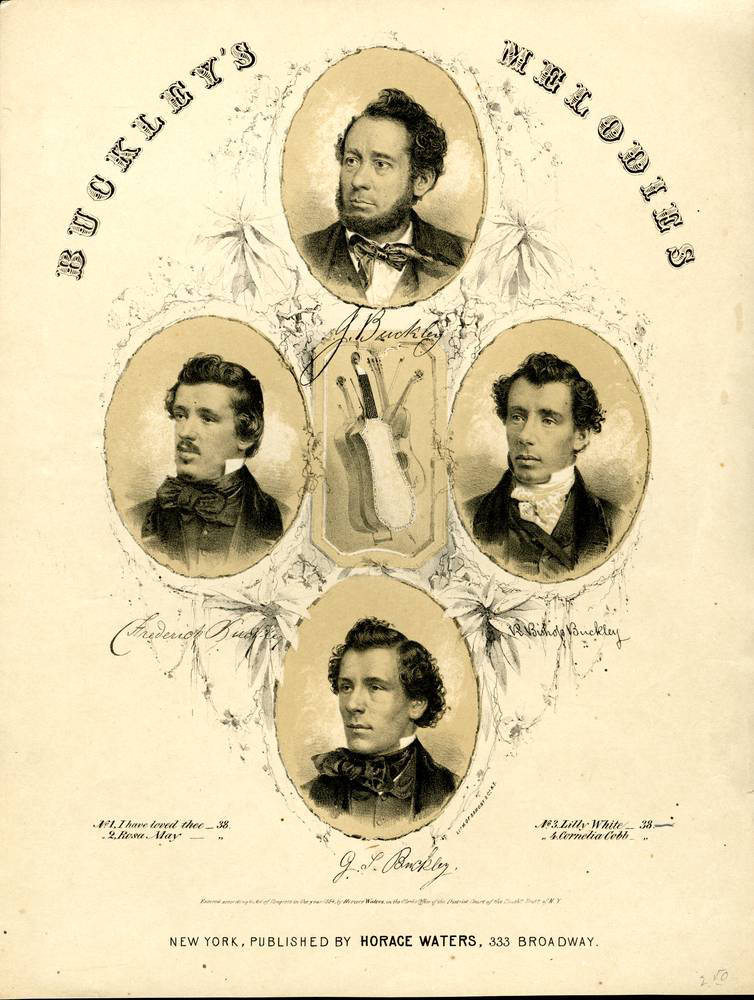
1854 lithograph with the original members of Buckley's Serenaders. Top: James Buckley (1803–1872); Bottom: George Swayne Buckley (1829–1879); Left: Frederick Buckley (1833–1864); Right: R. Bishop Buckley (1826–1867)

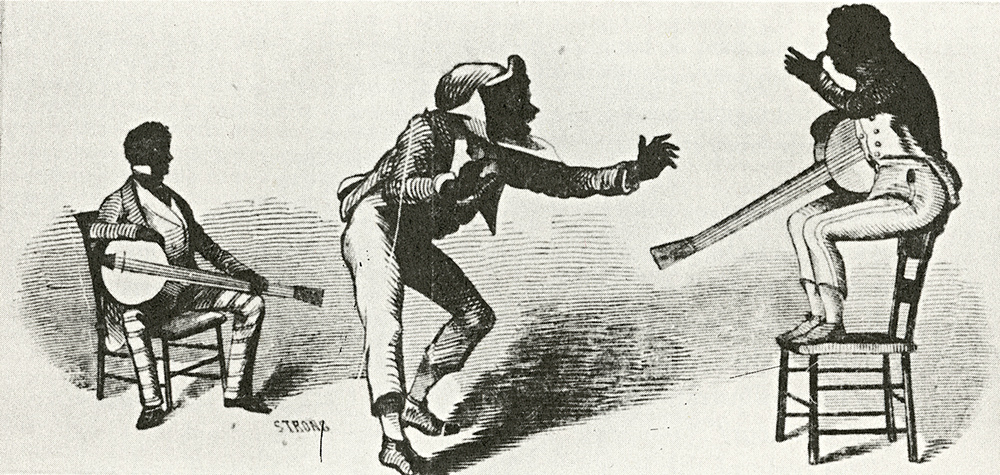
Detail from a playbill for Buckley's Serenaders, 16 December 1853.

Buckley's Serenaders, also known as Buckley's Melodies, was a family troupe of English-born American blackface minstrels, established under that name in 1853 by James Buckley. They became one of the two most popular companies in the U.S. from the mid-1850s to the 1860s, the other being the Christy and Wood Minstrels.

== Career ==
James Buckley was born in Manchester, England, in 1803, and emigrated with his family to the U.S. in the 1830s. By 1843, he organized a troupe of minstrels, the Congo Melodists, in Boston, Massachusetts. They performed in New Orleans, and in 1845 in New York City, when they were known as the New Orleans Serenaders. From 1846 to 1848, James Buckley and his three sons, Bishop, Swayne, and Fred, toured in England. Though they were an influential troupe in the United States, their absence allowed Edwin Christy's troupe to gain popularity and influence the development of the minstrel genre.

James Buckley - who was known as "Master Ole Bull" - and his sons returned to the U.S. at the end of 1848. They appeared regularly in New York and Boston, and in 1852 became the first recognized company to play in California. By the 1853–4 season, the Buckleys began to burlesque popular operas and boasted of their ability to reproduce such works. Some of these were Cinderella, La Sonnambula, and Don(e) Juan; or, A Ghost on a High horse (Don Giovanni). Another popular act involved Bishop Buckley's trained horse, Mazeppa.

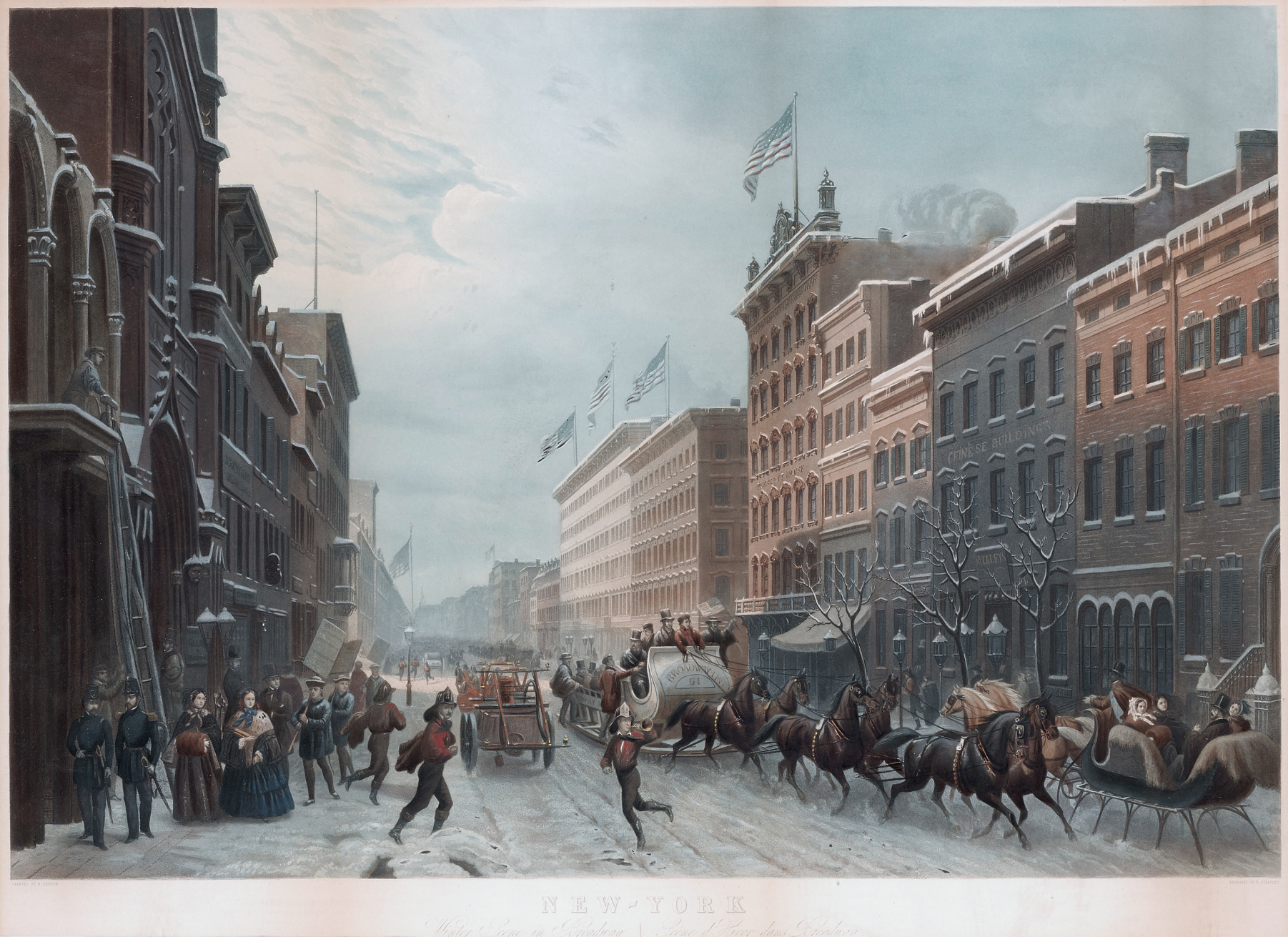
Broadway, 1857. The third building from the right is Buckley's

In 1853, they leased a New York City theatre at 539 Broadway, a hall they called Buckley's Opera House, the Ethiopian Opera House, and the American Opera House. The troupe roster stayed relatively consistent until 1855, with only non-members of the Buckley family coming or going. In 1856, they moved to 585 Broadway. By 1857, they were spending as much as six months there between tours. They also gave regular Sunday-evening concerts in whiteface at this location. However, like other minstrel companies, the Buckleys toured extensively. Upon their return to New York after a late 1857 tour, they published this advertisement:

Although we look ragged and black are our faces.

As free and as fair as the best we are found;

And our hearts are as white as those in fine places,

Although we're poor niggers dat travel around.

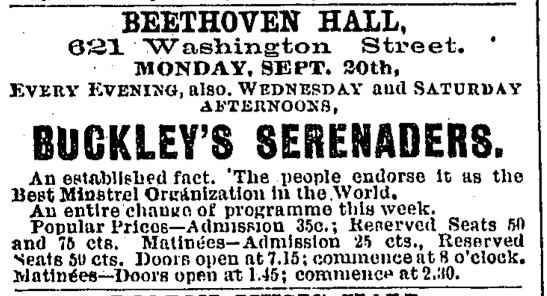
Advertisement for performance by Buckley's Serenaders at Boston's Beethoven Hall, 1875

They toured England again in 1860. Charles Dickens wrote of the Buckleys during an 1861 trip to the United States:

Wilkie and I . . . went to the Buckley's last night. They do the most preposterous things, in the way of Violin Solos, Deeply Sentimental Songs, and Lucrezia Borgia music, sung by a majestic female in black velvet and jewels with a blackened face! All that part of it, is intolerably bad. But the real Nigger things are very good; and there is one man—the tambourine—who attempts to do things with chairs, in remembrance of an acrobat he has seen, which is the most genuinely ludicrous thing of its kind, I ever beheld. Nor have I ever seen so good a presentation as his, of the real Negro.

The Buckleys closed the Opera House when the Concert Saloon Bill of 1862 forbade the combination of stage entertainment, female waitresses and sale of alcohol in New York theaters and saloons. After the death of his son Fred in 1864, James Buckley retired in 1866, and his son Bishop, a tenor singer and performer on the "Chinese fiddle", died the following year. George Swayne Buckley, described as the most versatile of the family as a singer and multi-instrumentalist, kept the company going until about 1876. He was noted for performing on a wide range of different instruments, sometimes playing several at the same time.

=== Family members ===
- James Buckley (1803, Manchester, England – April 27, 1882, Quincy, Massachusetts, U.S.)

His sons:

- R. Bishop Buckley (1826, England – June 6, 1867, Quincy, Massachusetts, U.S.)
- George Swayne Buckley (August 1829, Bolton, Lancashire, England – June 25, 1879, Quincy, Massachusetts, U.S.)
- Frederick Buckley (October 12, 1833, Bolton, Lancashire, England – September 12, 1864, Boston, Massachusetts, U.S.)
