= Alloways Creek Friends Meetinghouse =

Historic meetinghouse in New Jersey, United States

- U.S. National Register of Historic Places
- New Jersey Register of Historic Places
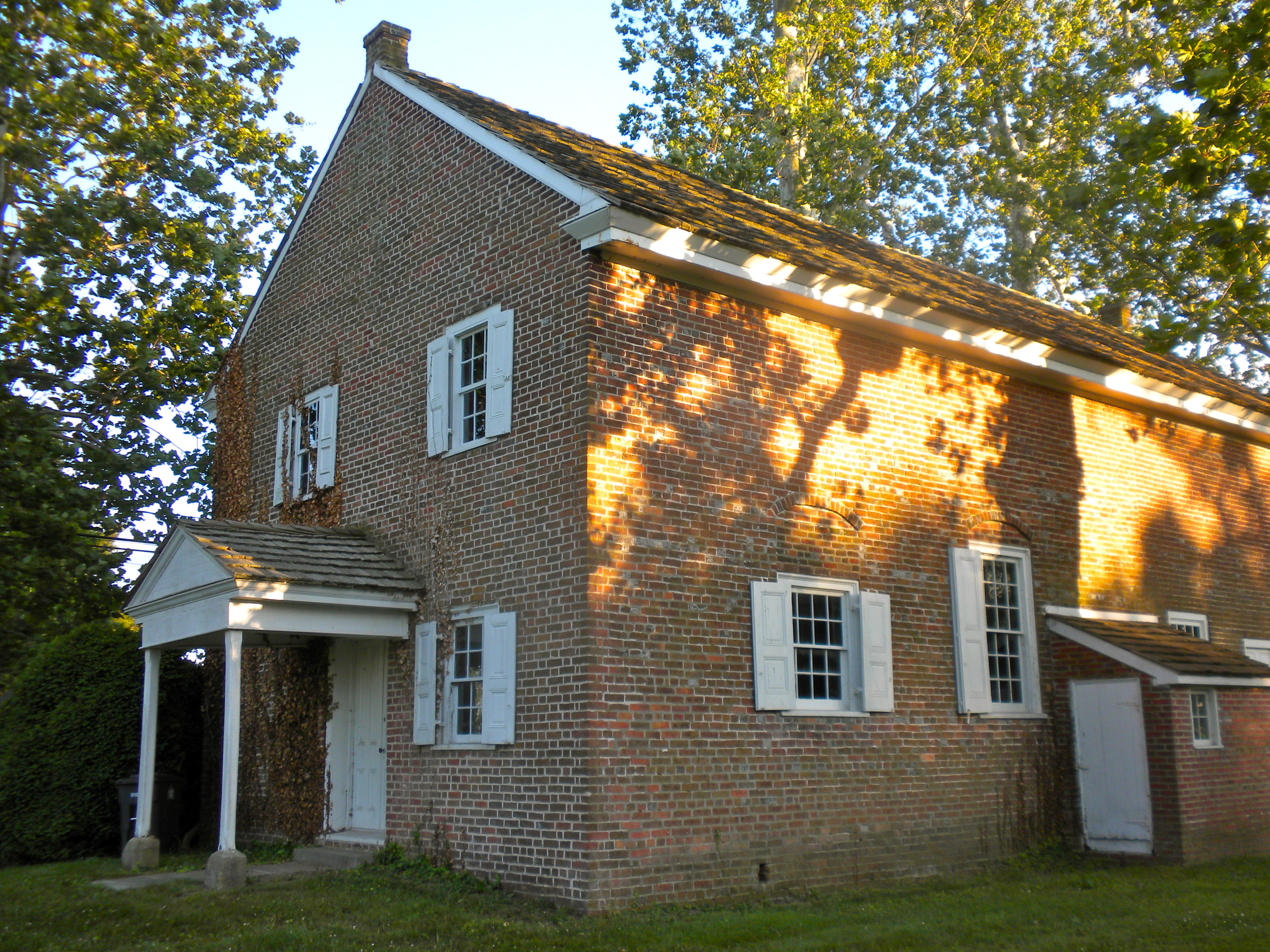

- Location within Salem County, New Jersey Location within New Jersey Location within the United States
- Location: Buttonwood Avenue, 150 feet west of Main Street; Hancock's Bridge, New Jersey
- Coordinates: 39°30′8″N 75°27′33″W
- Built: 1756
- Architectural style: Colonial
- NRHP reference No.: 03001306
- NJRHP No.: 4208

Significant dates
- Added to NRHP: December 18, 2003
- Designated NJRHP: October 28, 2003

Alloways Creek Friends Meetinghouse (also called Hancock's Bridge Friends Meetinghouse and Lower Alloways Creek Friends Meetinghouse) is a historic Quaker meeting house on Buttonwood Avenue, 150 feet west of Main Street in the Hancock's Bridge section of Lower Alloways Creek Township in Salem County, New Jersey, United States. It was built in 1756 and documented by the Historic American Buildings Survey. It was later added to the National Register of Historic Places on December 18, 2003, for its significance in architecture.

== History ==
The first meeting house for the Alloways Creek Meeting was built on the bank of Alloway Creek in 1685. The second was built in 1718. The third was built here in 1756 on land donated by William Hancock. An addition was constructed in 1784, adding a second story. The building is constructed of brick featuring Flemish bond.

== See also ==
- National Register of Historic Places listings in Salem County, New Jersey
- List of the oldest buildings in New Jersey
