= John Griscom =

American educator (1774-1852)

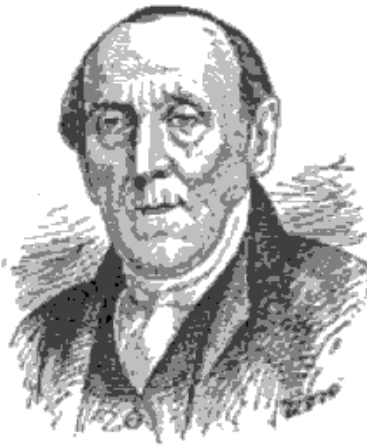
- Born: September 27, 1774; Hancock's Bridge, New Jersey
- Died: February 26, 1852 (aged 77); Burlington, New Jersey
- Occupation: Educator
- Employers: Queens College; Columbia College
- Children: John H. Griscom

John Griscom (September 27, 1774 – February 26, 1852) was an early American lecturer and educator, and one of the first American educators to teach chemistry.

He was the father of John H. Griscom, (1809–1874), a leading physician.

== Biography ==
John Griscom was born on September 27, 1774, in the Hancock's Bridge section of Lower Alloways Creek Township, New Jersey.

He was active as an Evangelical Quaker, which led to his leadership of the movement to reform penitentiaries.

He taught at Queens College (now Rutgers University) from 1812 to 1828, and at Columbia College. He founded New York's first anti-poverty organization, the New York Society for the Prevention of Pauperism. He also opened the New York High School in 1825, the first monitorial system school in New York. In 1836, he was elected as a member to the American Philosophical Society.

He died in Burlington, New Jersey, on February 26, 1852.
