= Mechanics' Hall (New York City) =

19th-century theatre in Manhattan, New York

Coordinates: 40.721°N 74.000°W

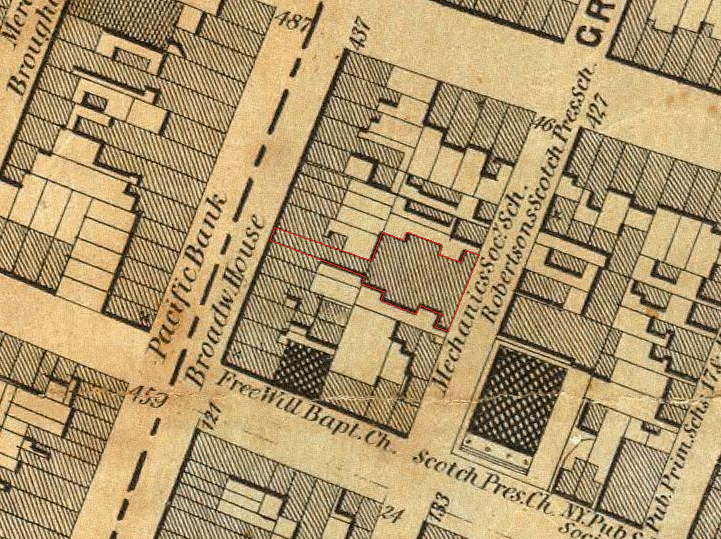
Detail of 1852 New York City map showing the location of Mechanic's Hall. A narrow corridor provided frontage on Broadway to lot formerly occupied by New York High School.

Mechanics' Hall was a meeting hall and theatre seating 2,500 people located at 472 Broadway in New York City, New York, U.S. It had a brown façade. Built by the Mechanics' Society for their monthly meetings in 1847, it was also used for banquets, luncheons, and speeches held by other groups.

The building eventually became a playhouse. During this time, it was variously known as the Abbey Theatre, Butler's American Theatre, and other names. The blackface minstrel troupe Buckley's Serenaders saw great success there until 1846. Christy's Minstrels became the resident minstrel company in February 1847 and bought the building later that year. They remained until July 1854, when the troupe disbanded. Bryants Minstrels played at Mechanics' Hall for the first time in 1857, leaving after May 1866, when the house was taken over for a season by minstrel showman Charles "Charlie" White.

In 1867, showman Robert Butler took over management of Mechanics' Hall following a fire that destroyed his former theater at 444 Broadway. Butler's luck was no better in the new venue as Mechanics' Hall was also destroyed by fire later that year.
