= E. P. Christy =

American entertainer

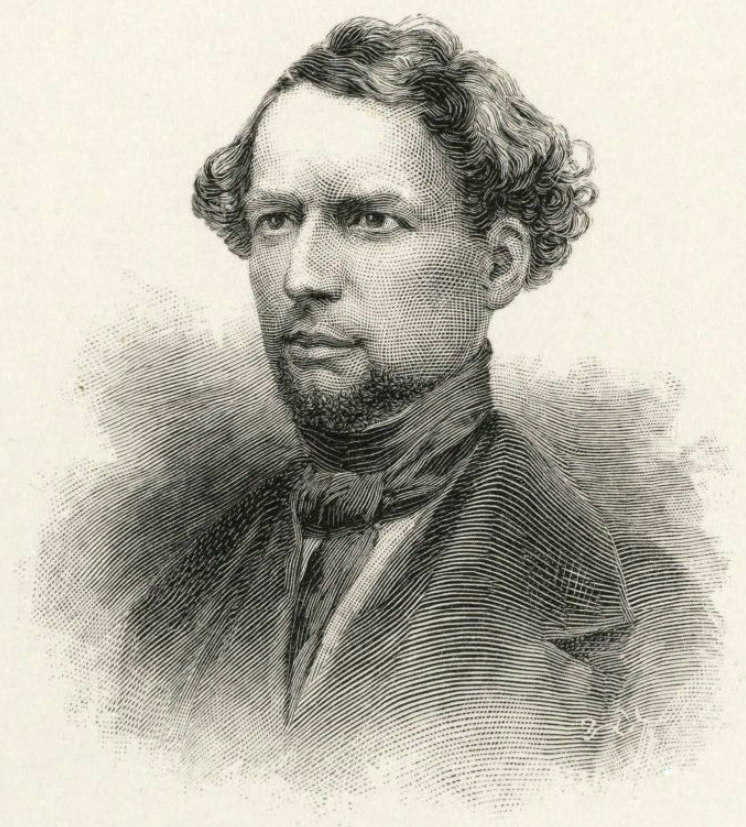
- Born: Edwin Pearce Christy; November 28, 1815; Philadelphia, Pennsylvania, US
- Died: May 21, 1862 (aged 46); Manhattan, New York City, US
- Other names: E. P. Christy, Edwin Pearce
- Occupations: composer, singer, actor, stage producer
- Known for: Blackface minstrel performer

Edwin Pearce Christy (November 28, 1815 – May 21, 1862) was an American composer, singer, actor and stage producer. He was the founder of the blackface minstrel group Christy's Minstrels. He toured England performing.

== Biography ==
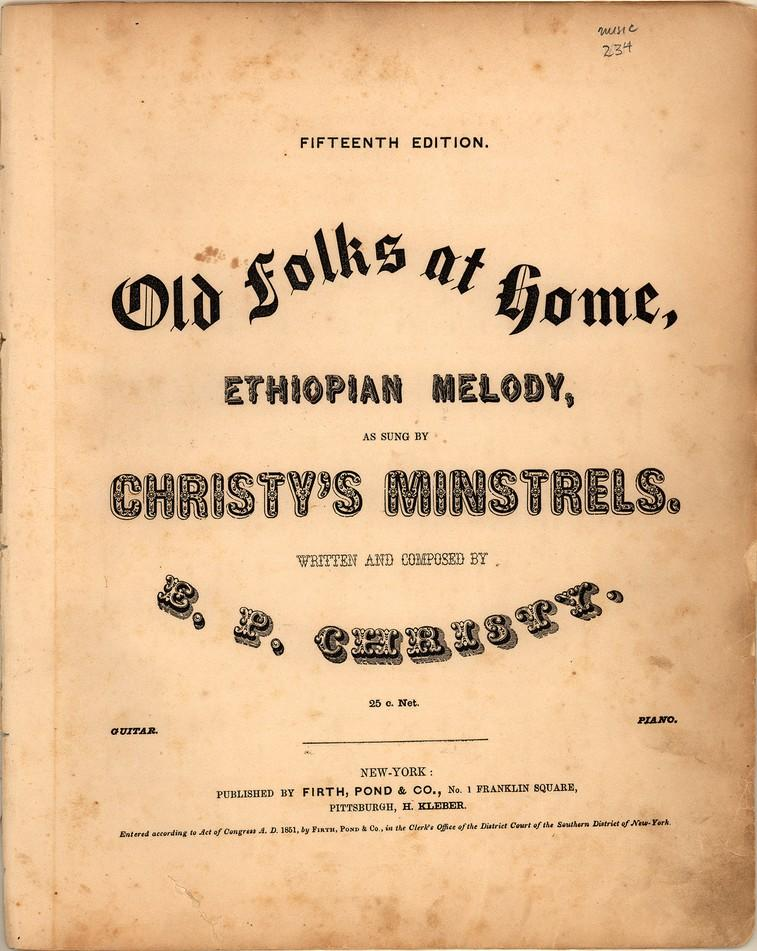
"Old Folks at Home" sheet music crediting Christy as the songwriter

He was born on November 28, 1815, in Philadelphia, Pennsylvania, to Robert F. Christy and Ruth Wheaton.

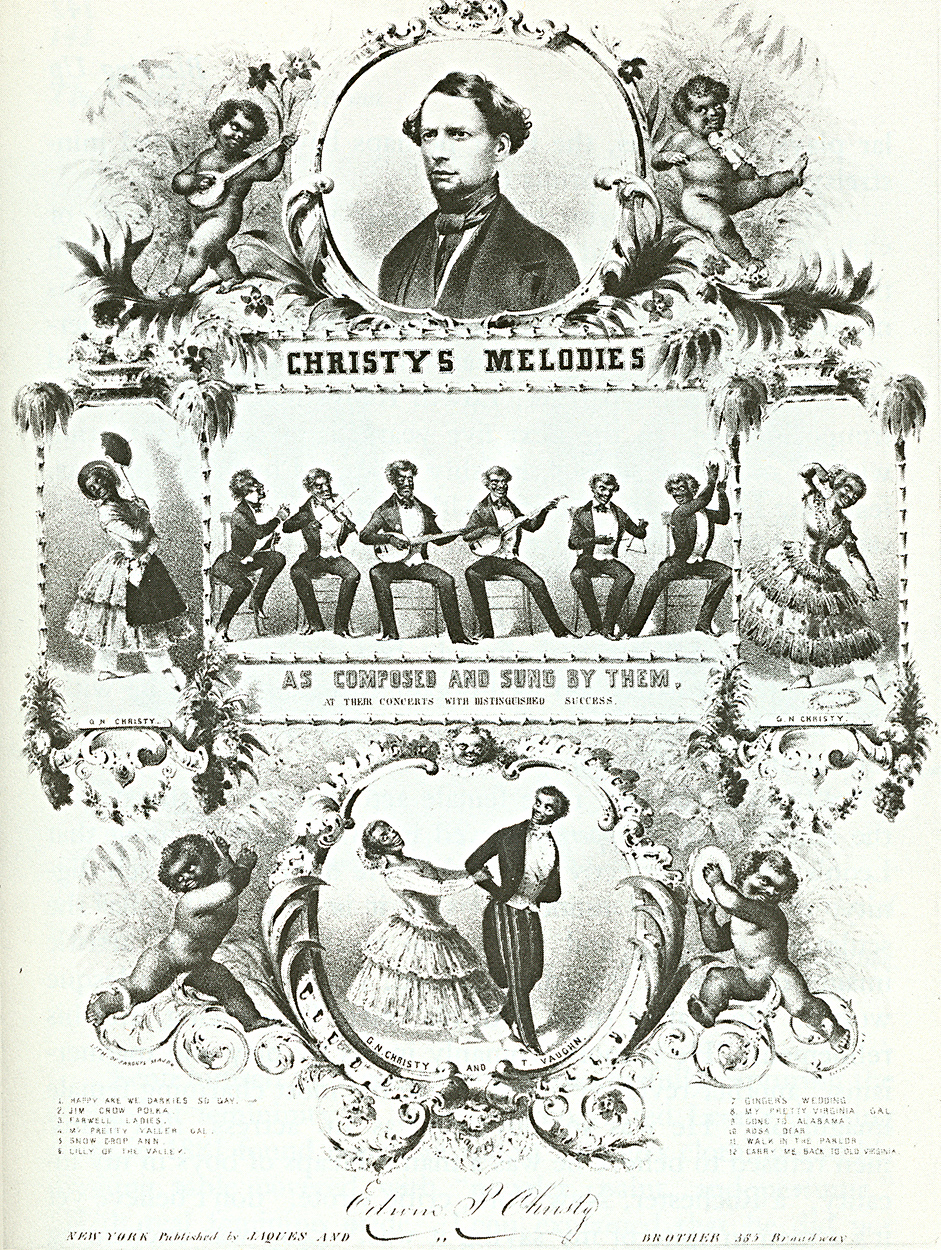
Music cover

Christy began his career as a minstrel in Buffalo, New York. By 1836 he was a member of the company managed by Edwin Dean at the Eagle Street Theater in Buffalo. He toured upstate New York from 1843 to 1845. The group took the name of its founder and became known as the Christy's Minstrels. In April 1846 Christy and his band of six performers began performing in New York City at Polmer's Opera House. The group performed at Mechanics Hall from February 15, 1847, to July 15, 1854. After performing at a benefit performance for Stephen Foster in Cincinnati, Ohio, on August 25, 1847, the group specialized in performances of Foster's works. Foster sold his song "Old Folks at Home" to Christy for his exclusive use.

Christy retired as a performer in 1855.

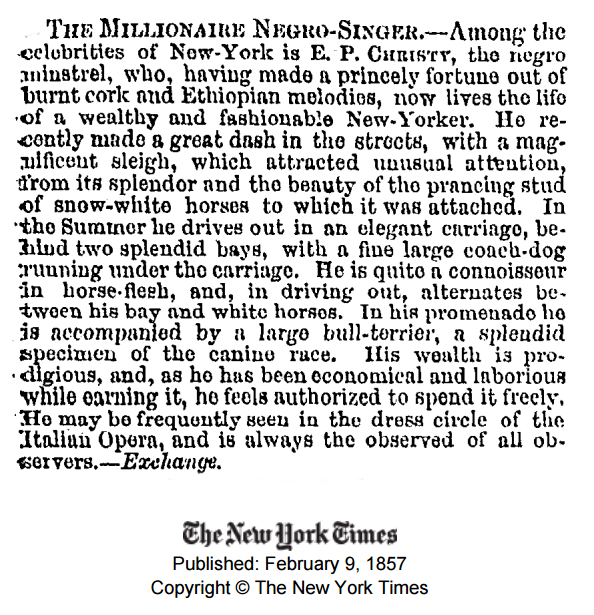
1857 New York Times writeup on him

He operated a chain of theaters called Christy's Opera Houses in several cities. The name of the original group, Christy's Minstrels, was licensed for use by a new organization and became synonymous with the performance tradition of blackface minstrelsy.

Fearful of financial reverses due to the upheaval of the American Civil War, Christy died by suicide by throwing himself from a window in his home at 78 East Eighteenth Street, one block east of Broadway, in Manhattan, New York City, on May 20, 1862. He died on May 21, 1862, of his injuries. He was buried in Green-Wood Cemetery in Brooklyn, New York. His oral last will and testament that was made while hospitalized was declared void by the surrogate court when it ruled that there were no witnesses, other than the person providing the testimony. In 1881 his widow died and her will was also contested.

== Legacy ==
Christy was first played by William Frawley in the Foster biopic Harmony Lane (1935). The second actor to play Christy was Al Jolson in the Foster biopic Swanee River in 1939. He also wrote the lyrics to "The Yellow Rose of Texas".

In a later biopic of the composer, the singing actor Ray Middleton portrayed Christy.

== Music publications ==
- Christy's Plantation Melodies

== Songs ==
- "Lucy Long"
- "Yaller Gals"
- "Oh, Mr. Coon"
- "Licy Newl"
- "Snow Drop Ann"
- "The Negro Generals"
- "Farewell Ladies"
- "Massa's in De Cold Ground"
