= Salem Nuclear Power Plant =

Nuclear power plant in New Jersey, United States

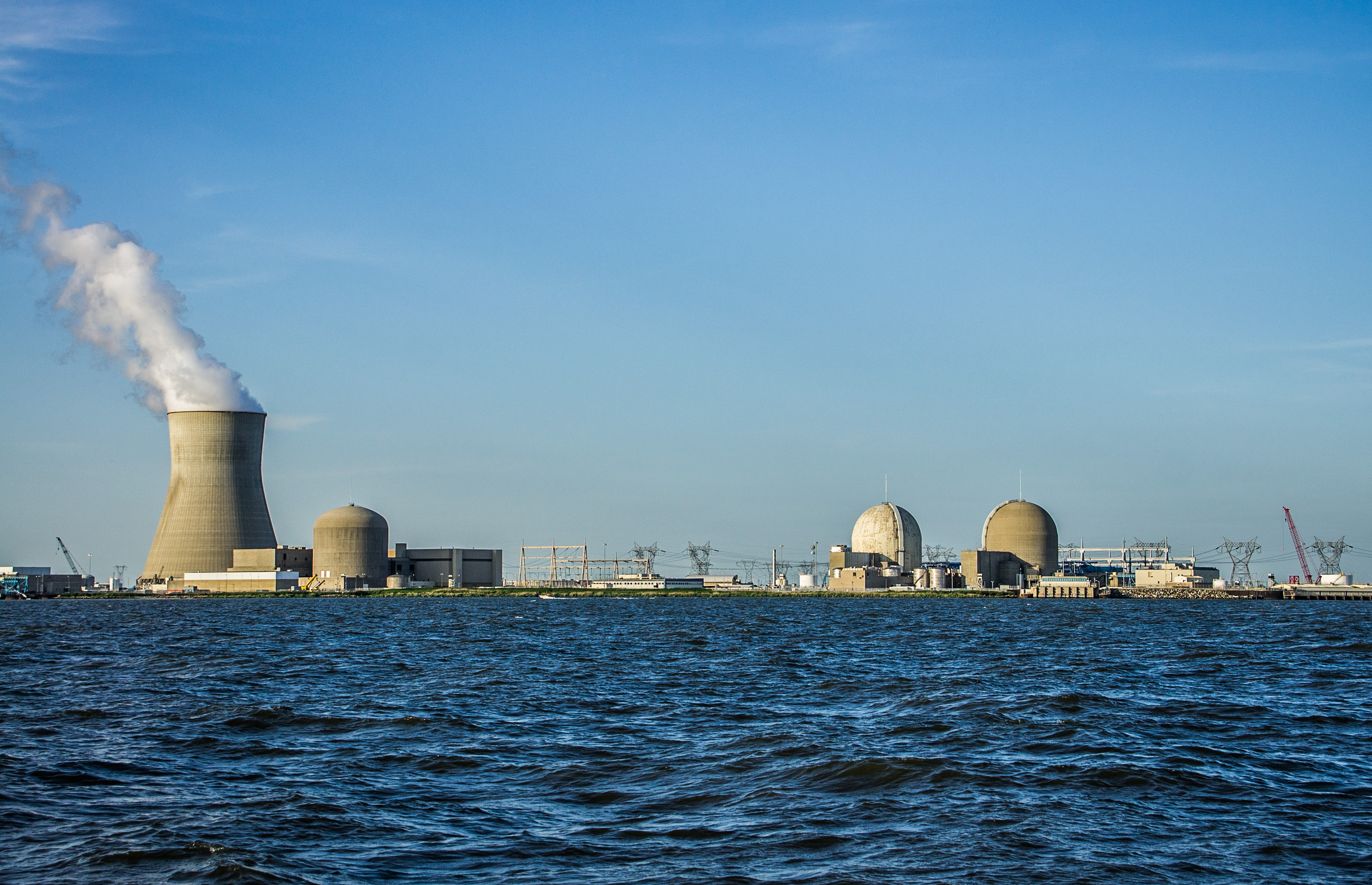
- The entire PSEG nuclear complex as seen from the Delaware Bay.
- Country: United States
- Location: Lower Alloways Creek, Salem County, New Jersey
- Coordinates: 39°27′46″N 75°32′8″W
- Status: Operational
- Construction began: September 25, 1968
- Commission date: Unit 1: June 30, 1977; Unit 2: October 13, 1981
- Construction cost: $4.283 billion (2007 USD)
- Owners: PSEG (57%); Constellation Energy (43%)
- Operator: PSEG

Nuclear power station
- Reactor type: PWR
- Reactor supplier: Westinghouse
- Cooling source: Delaware River
- Thermal capacity: 2 × 3459 MW_{th}

Power generation
- Units operational: 1 × 1169 MW; 1 × 1158 MW
- Make and model: WH 4-loop (DRYAMB)
- Nameplate capacity: 2327 MW
- Capacity factor: 88.55% (2017); 70.50% (lifetime)
- Annual net output: 19,062 GWh (2021)

External links
- Website: Salem Generating Station
- Commons: Related media on Commons

The Salem Nuclear Power Plant is a two-unit pressurized water reactor nuclear power plant located in Lower Alloways Creek Township, in Salem County, New Jersey, United States. It is owned by PSEG Nuclear LLC of the Public Service Enterprise Group and Constellation Energy.

In 2019, New Jersey began providing the state's nuclear plants Zero-Emission Certificates worth $300 million a year to keep them in service. The subsidy was ended in 2024, effective June 1, 2025, as the Inflation Reduction Act provides alternative tax credits to support clean energy.

== Location ==
The Salem Nuclear Generating Station is located about 18 miles south of Wilmington, Delaware. It shares an artificial island in the Delaware Bay with the Hope Creek Nuclear Generating Station. Together, they form the fourth largest nuclear generating site in the United States.

The Salem facility has two operating units, both pressurized water reactors (PWRs) built by Westinghouse. Construction began on September 25, 1968. Salem Unit 1 began commercial operations on June 30, 1977, and Unit 2 on October 13, 1981. The complex covers about 740 acres.

== Reactors ==
The reactors, both PWRs, were built by Westinghouse, and began commercial operation in 1977 (Unit 1) and 1981 (Unit 2). The two-unit plant has a capacity of 2,275 MWe. In 2009, PSEG applied for 20-year license renewals for both units, which were approved by the NRC in 2011.

Unit 1 is now licensed to operate until August 13, 2036 and Unit 2 is licensed to operate until April 18, 2040.

== Surrounding population ==
The Nuclear Regulatory Commission defines two emergency planning zones around nuclear power plants: a plume exposure pathway zone with a radius of 10 miles (16 km), concerned primarily with exposure to, and inhalation of, airborne radioactive contamination, and an ingestion pathway zone of about 50 miles (80 km), concerned primarily with ingestion of food and liquid contaminated by radioactivity.

The 2010 U.S. population within 10 miles (16 km) of Salem was 52,091, an increase of 54.1 percent in a decade, according to an analysis of U.S. Census data. The 2010 U.S. population within 50 miles (80 km) was 5,482,329, an increase of 7.6 percent since 2000.

Cities within 50 miles:

- New Jersey
  - Camden (39 mi/63 km)
  - Vineland (27 mi/44 km)
- Delaware
  - Dover (Capital) (21 mi/34 km)
  - Wilmington (19 mi/31 km)
- Pennsylvania
  - Philadelphia (43 mi/70 km)

== Safety issues ==
In the 1990s, the Salem nuclear reactors were shut down for two years due to maintenance issues, according to The New York Times. Consultants identified several problems, including a leaking generator, unreliable reactor controls, and a workplace culture where employees feared retaliation for reporting issues. In 2004, the Nuclear Regulatory Commission (NRC) increased oversight and monitoring of the Salem plants.

An extensive NRC investigation, along with a review by independent consultants, later identified minor issues such as inadequate routine maintenance and low employee morale. However, the plant was found to be safe.

On August 22, 2013, the Salem plant was temporarily shut down following a leak of slightly radioactive water. The spill was contained within the plant’s containment building, and regulators stated there was no risk to the public. The plant resumed operations less than 48 hours later, on August 24.

In May 2014, during a scheduled refueling outage at Salem 2, broken bolts from a cooling pump were discovered inside the reactor vessel. Westinghouse inspected the site and found additional bolts at the bottom of the cooling pumps and the reactor vessel. Salem Unit 2 returned to service on July 11, 2014.

== Environmental concerns ==
=== Cooling system and fish mortality ===
The Salem Nuclear Generating Station has faced ongoing environmental concerns related to its cooling system. The plant draws billions of gallons of water daily from the Delaware River to cool steam produced during nuclear fission, returning the water to the estuary at elevated temperatures.

Environmental groups, including the Delaware Riverkeeper Network led by Maya van Rossum, have criticized the system for causing high fish mortality. Estimates suggest that approximately 3 billion adult fish, along with additional eggs and larvae, are killed each year. According to van Rossum, the plant kills about 48% of the striped bass population in the Delaware River annually.

The bay anchovy, an important species in the local ecosystem, has also reportedly experienced population declines. Van Rossum has referred to the plant as the “largest predator in the Delaware estuary.” These concerns have been the subject of extended legal disputes between environmental organizations and regulatory agencies.

=== Water permit disputes ===
In October 2013, the Delaware Riverkeeper Network, New Jersey Sierra Club, and Clean Water Action filed a lawsuit against the New Jersey Department of Environmental Protection (NJDEP) over delays in renewing the Salem plant’s water discharge permit. The case focused on NJDEP’s failure to act on PSE&G’s 2006 application for a New Jersey Pollution Discharge Elimination System (NJPDES) permit and whether cooling towers should be required to reduce fish deaths.

In November 2014, the parties settled. NJDEP agreed to issue a draft discharge permit by June 30, 2015. The permit, when released, did not mandate the construction of cooling towers at Salem Units 1 and 2, a measure that would have cost about $1 billion.

== Electricity production ==
Generation (MWh) of Salem Nuclear Power Plant (Nuclear Only)
Year	Jan	Feb	Mar	Apr	May	Jun	Jul	Aug	Sep	Oct	Nov	Dec	Annual (Total)
2001	1,628,101	1,476,038	1,636,734	898,461	956,394	1,555,773	1,635,714	1,640,717	1,340,729	1,216,108	1,572,067	1,648,210	17,205,046
2002	1,488,857	1,488,857	1,379,434	892,102	1,179,097	1,593,794	1,645,258	1,640,861	1,580,364	1,058,506	1,384,535	1,667,409	16,999,074
2003	--	1,491,748	1,499,538	1,544,442	1,645,766	1,602,610	1,578,978	1,562,350	1,167,010	958,594	810,053	1,653,057	15,514,146
2004	1,646,987	1,571,693	1,621,231	781,182	520,553	1,398,370	1,446,170	1,708,616	1,349,519	1,713,702	1,658,472	780,544	16,197,039
2005	1,735,382	1,573,110	1,741,799	875,865	1,387,424	1,648,504	1,704,117	1,676,623	1,632,572	1,144,062	1,495,383	1,729,597	18,344,438
2006	1,740,543	1,555,055	1,638,043	1,672,530	1,716,863	1,650,329	1,677,674	1,664,945	1,566,550	1,086,234	1,638,970	1,741,231	19,348,967
2007	1,742,364	1,572,703	1,569,646	936,155	1,392,982	1,593,517	1,698,054	1,647,440	1,639,591	1,718,133	1,686,017	1,631,592	18,828,194
2008	1,712,247	1,622,282	1,096,556	841,672	1,298,550	1,662,476	1,700,993	1,717,567	1,632,594	1,221,757	1,273,312	1,758,719	17,538,725
2009	1,773,789	1,595,891	1,681,961	1,701,558	1,733,739	1,672,693	1,726,023	1,716,463	1,673,182	1,231,232	1,375,976	1,766,821	19,649,328
2010	1,639,182	1,598,270	1,739,970	892,605	1,734,660	1,610,038	1,224,576	1,706,759	1,651,289	1,465,828	1,704,223	1,764,399	18,731,799
2011	1,766,487	1,595,472	1,699,347	885,545	1,419,677	1,545,819	1,493,822	1,700,565	1,453,030	1,467,788	1,047,417	1,758,277	17,833,246
2012	1,769,542	1,661,594	1,650,173	1,685,401	1,545,209	1,664,519	1,704,092	1,706,029	1,662,898	1,177,993	909,265	1,707,670	18,844,385
2013	1,763,960	1,594,976	1,761,823	1,231,680	938,582	1,677,435	1,711,099	1,651,564	1,674,978	1,738,730	1,698,788	1,764,607	19,208,222
2014	1,741,462	1,497,633	1,754,020	936,092	734,169	826,915	1,272,464	1,713,875	1,660,745	1,378,846	1,011,872	1,755,042	16,283,135
2015	1,756,614	1,546,196	1,362,166	1,652,963	1,732,355	1,665,366	1,690,924	1,584,137	1,661,112	1,470,197	794,652	1,676,947	18,593,629
2016	1,745,954	1,477,108	1,743,093	1,221,654	861,781	743,685	33,362	1,428,389	1,284,570	1,741,491	1,666,431	1,749,118	15,696,636
2017	1,752,226	1,558,083	1,686,867	1,227,730	874,729	1,649,555	1,692,972	1,704,628	1,592,457	1,169,309	1,325,320	1,741,290	17,975,166
2018	1,744,791	1,577,669	1,735,539	1,686,643	1,655,340	1,650,424	1,691,007	1,681,399	1,391,247	1,045,889	1,293,387	1,741,707	18,895,042
2019	1,713,154	1,541,262	1,559,671	1,050,539	849,412	1,118,327	1,687,304	1,591,030	1,651,381	1,725,138	1,680,788	1,742,256	17,910,262
2020	1,743,928	1,512,141	987,287	1,098,063	1,201,045	1,658,761	1,683,423	1,662,313	1,659,121	913,481	838,307	1,187,566	16,145,436
2021	1,752,658	1,583,539	1,746,500	1,692,936	1,733,797	1,655,602	1,691,582	1,692,328	1,583,540	879,156	1,309,930	1,740,433	19,062,001
2022	1,739,247	1,574,370	1,740,619	1,058,949	1,201,411	1,657,545	1,690,064	1,694,026	1,657,698	1,727,566	1,687,375	1,691,254	19,120,124
2023	1,752,270	1,577,844	1,667,278	893,520	1,734,382	1,667,146	1,697,885	1,703,433	1,609,279	1,013,927	1,328,114	1,751,973	18,397,051
2024	1,739,729	1,612,947	1,730,431	1,680,298	1,719,576	1,646,979	1,674,429	1,675,213	1,630,973	955,949	897,175	1,746,642	18,710,341
2025	1,667,582	1,578,313	1,696,162	1,098,153	851,646	1,644,125	1,687,216	1,698,585	1,649,092	1,724,689	1,678,320	1,738,753	18,712,636
2026	1,740,689	1,566,279	1,734,820	945,567	1,482,060	1,646,259	1,677,569	1,691,709					--

== Water use ==
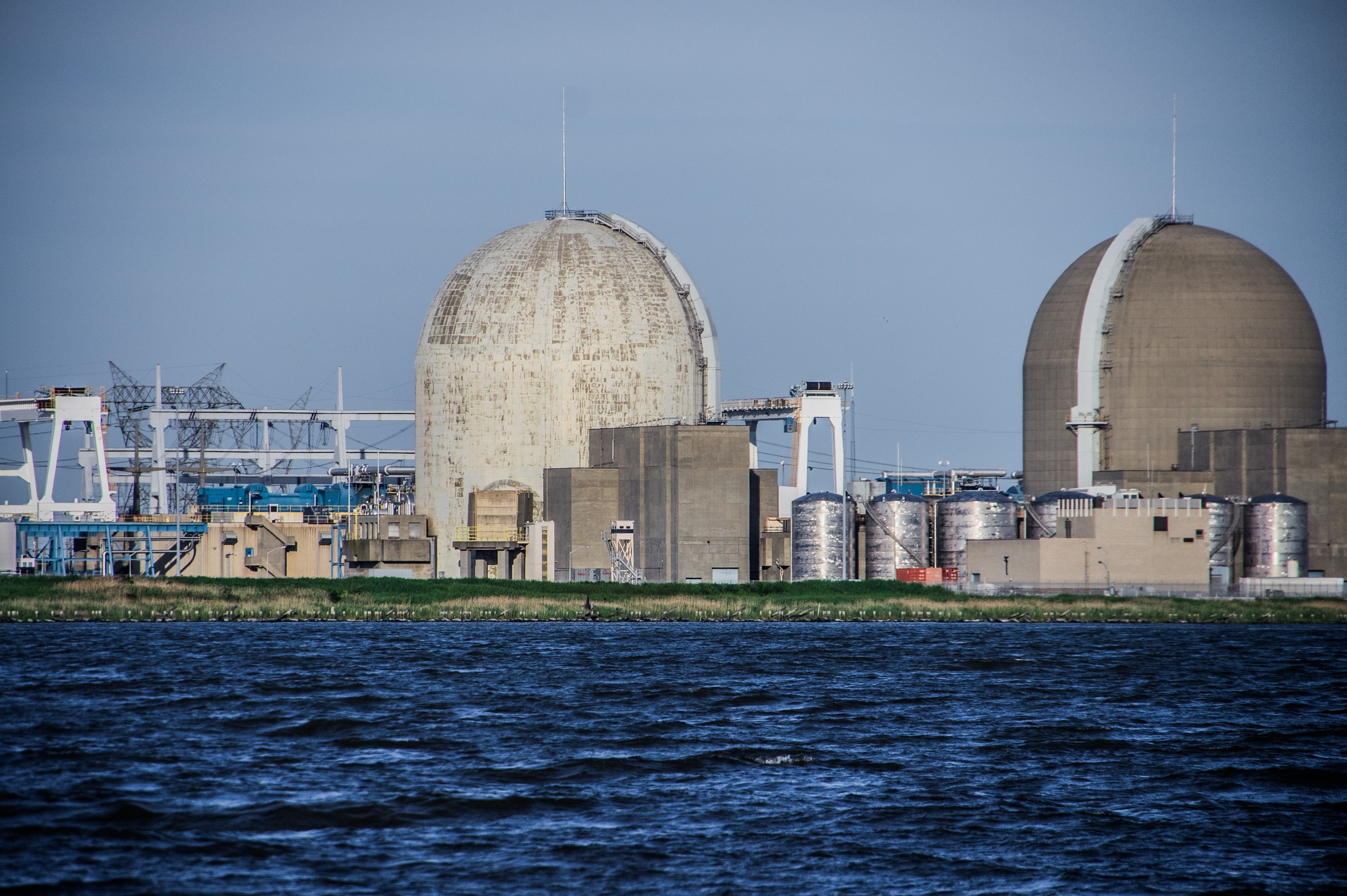
The Salem Nuclear Power Plant, as photographed from Delaware Bay

Salem Units 1 and 2 use water from Delaware Bay for cooling. Water is drawn through an intake building equipped with rotating screens that remove debris, which is later washed away. Occasionally, heavy accumulations of grass clog the intakes, causing the reactors to operate at reduced power for extended periods. Approximately 2 gigawatts of waste heat from the steam cycle are discharged into the bay. Regulations limit the resulting water temperature increase to less than 1 °C during summer months and 2 °C during the rest of the year. The large closed-cycle cooling tower on the site belongs to the adjacent Hope Creek plant and is not used by the Salem reactors.

== See also ==
- List of largest power stations in the United States
