= Hope Creek Nuclear Generating Station =

Nuclear power plant located in Lower Alloways Creek Township, Salem County, New Jersey

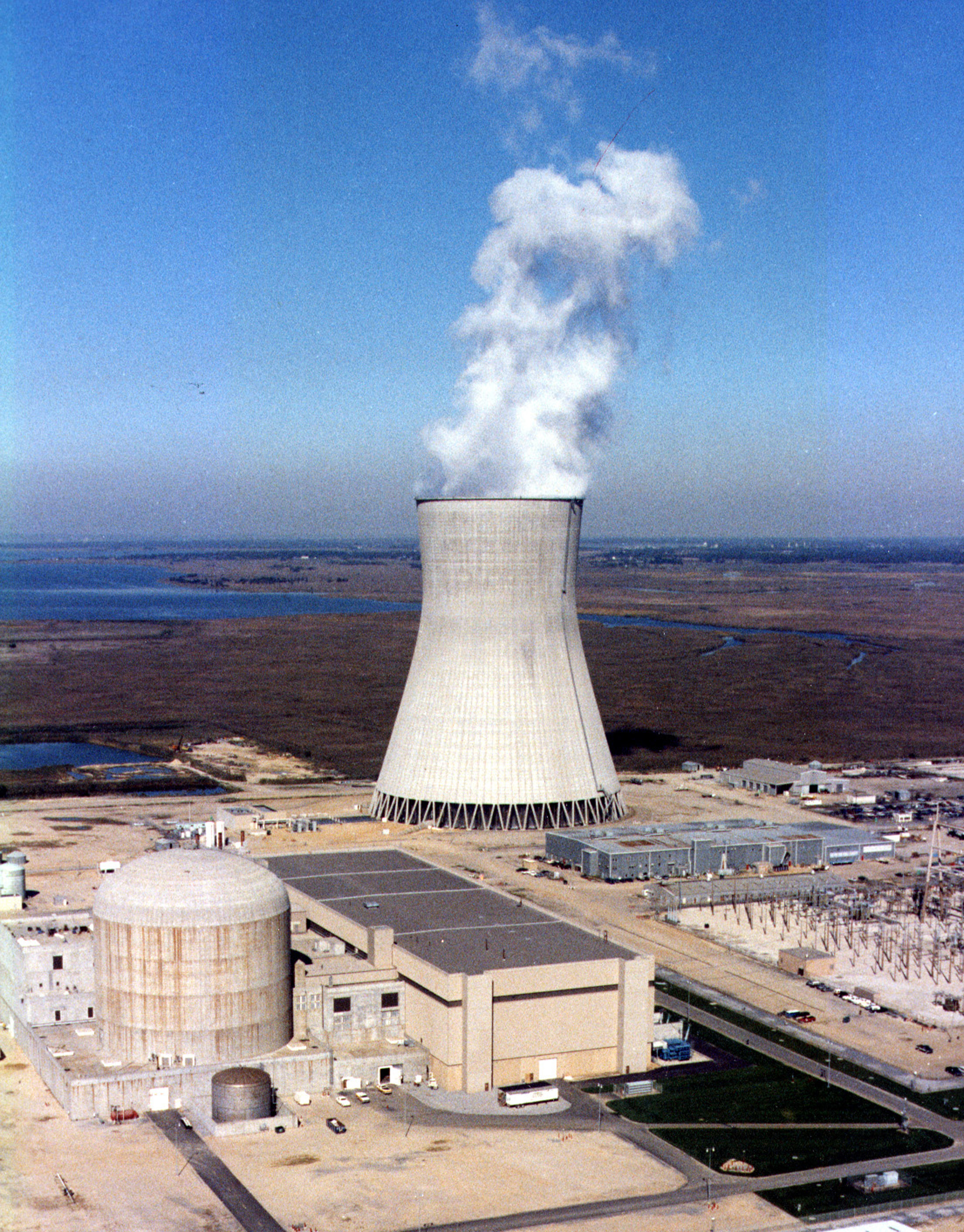
- Hope Creek NPP, image courtesy of the NRC
- Country: United States
- Location: Lower Alloways Creek, Salem County, New Jersey
- Coordinates: 39°28′04″N 75°32′17″W
- Status: Operational
- Construction began: March 1, 1976
- Commission date: December 20, 1986
- Construction cost: $8.510 billion (2007 USD)
- Owner: PSEG
- Operator: PSEG

Nuclear power station
- Reactor type: BWR
- Reactor supplier: General Electric
- Cooling towers: 1 × Natural Draft
- Cooling source: Delaware River
- Thermal capacity: 1 × 3840 MW_{th}

Power generation
- Units operational: 1 × 1172 MW
- Make and model: BWR-4 (Mark 1)
- Units cancelled: 1 × 1067 MW
- Nameplate capacity: 1172 MW
- Capacity factor: 103.81% (2017); 87.1% (lifetime)
- Annual net output: 10,658 GWh (2017)

External links
- Website: Hope Creek Nuclear Generating Station
- Commons: Related media on Commons

Hope Creek Nuclear Generating Station is a nuclear power plant located in Lower Alloways Creek Township, Salem County, New Jersey, United States. It sits on an artificial island alongside the Salem Nuclear Power Plant. The station is owned and operated by PSEG Nuclear LLC, a subsidiary of Public Service Enterprise Group.

It has a single unit, a boiling water reactor (BWR) built by General Electric. Originally planned for two units, the second unit was canceled in 1981. Hope Creek has a generating capacity of 1,268 megawatts electric (MWe). The plant began operation on July 25, 1986, with an initial license to run until 2026. In 2009, PSEG applied for a 20-year license extension, which was granted in 2011, allowing operation until 2046.

Together with the Salem Nuclear Power Plant, the Salem–Hope Creek complex produces 3,572 megawatts, making it the largest nuclear power facility in the Eastern United States and the fourth largest in the country. Hope Creek, along with the Salem Nuclear Power Plant, produces approximately 40% of New Jersey’s electricity and 85% of its carbon-free electricity, making it an important part of the state’s energy infrastructure.

Hope Creek is one of three licensed nuclear power reactors in New Jersey. The others are the two units at the adjacent Salem plant. In 2021, nuclear plants generated 45% of the electricity in the state.

In 2019, New Jersey began providing the state's nuclear plants Zero-Emission Certificates worth $300 million a year to keep them in service. The subsidy was ended in 2024, effective June 1, 2025, as the Inflation Reduction Act provides alternative tax credits to support clean energy.

== Plant features ==
Hope Creek is a boiling water reactor (BWR) unlike its neighbors at the nearby Salem Nuclear Plant which are pressurized water reactors (PWR).

Hope Creek's reactor is used to produce electricity. The plant's huge natural-draft cooling tower can be seen from many miles away in both Delaware and New Jersey and as far west as Elk Neck Peninsula in Maryland. The cooling tower can be seen from the Delaware Memorial Bridge and the bridges over the Chesapeake and Delaware Canal. This cooling tower serves only Hope Creek's single reactor. The neighboring Salem units utilize once-through cooling with no cooling tower.

A unique feature of Hope Creek is its cylindrical reactor building complete with a dome which makes it appear similar to a pressurized water reactor containment building which is not typical of boiling water reactors. This similarity is limited to appearance. Like other BWRs, the actual containment vessel for the reactor is a separate drywell/torus structure enclosed within the reactor building, but structurally separate. The outer reactor building serves as secondary containment and houses many of the reactor's safety systems.

== Controversies and safety concerns ==
On October 10, 2004, the Hope Creek Nuclear Generating Station experienced a steam leak that led to a shutdown. Operators reported issues with fluctuating reactor pressure, changing water levels, and problems with the high-pressure coolant injection system, a key safety component. Following the incident, the Nuclear Regulatory Commission (NRC) placed the plant under increased oversight.

The 2004 shutdown raised renewed concerns about safety practices and management at Hope Creek and the neighboring Salem Nuclear Power Plant. Former employees and watchdog groups criticized plant management for alleged maintenance delays and for discouraging the reporting of safety concerns. Delaware senators, including then-Senator Joe Biden, contacted the NRC to express concern over ongoing issues with management and safety culture, similar to problems reported in earlier decades.

In response, the NRC placed Hope Creek and Salem under special oversight, citing maintenance backlogs, equipment problems, and a workplace environment that discouraged reporting safety issues. Investigations identified equipment and performance deficiencies, leading to updates in employee training and operational procedures.

== Surrounding population ==
The Nuclear Regulatory Commission defines two emergency planning zones around nuclear power plants: a plume exposure pathway zone with a radius of 10 miles (16 km), concerned primarily with exposure to, and inhalation of, airborne radioactive contamination, and an ingestion pathway zone of about 50 miles (80 km), concerned primarily with ingestion of food and liquid contaminated by radioactivity.

The 2010 U.S. population within 10 miles (16 km) of Hope Creek was 53,811, an increase of 53.3 percent in a decade, according to an analysis of U.S. Census data for msnbc.com. The 2010 U.S. population within 50 miles (80 km) was 5,523,010, an increase of 7.5 percent since 2000.

Cities within 50 miles:

- New Jersey
  - Camden (39 mi/63 km)
  - Vineland (27 mi/44 km)
  - Pennsville (12 mi/20 km)
  - Salem (County Capital) (8 mi/13 km)
- Delaware
  - Dover (Capital) (21 mi/34 km)
  - Wilmington (19 mi/31 km)
- Pennsylvania
  - Philadelphia (43 mi/70 km)

== Electricity production ==
Generation (MWh) of Hope Creek Nuclear Generating Station
Year	Jan	Feb	Mar	Apr	May	Jun	Jul	Aug	Sep	Oct	Nov	Dec	Annual (Total)
2001	788,170	718,046	787,980	743,123	538,212	747,120	768,484	779,626	748,126	196,043	616,558	620,533	8,051,021
2002	806,577	717,057	728,675	773,353	630,110	561,751	781,291	749,505	737,734	776,241	771,830	804,666	9,838,790
2003	791,347	718,805	409,815	352,710	389,754	743,334	785,188	781,856	480,493	641,234	761,682	404,364	7,260,582
2004	617,530	715,302	495,484	228,783	785,519	724,022	770,189	740,863	723,027	240,440	-6,973	-6,825	5,027,361
2005	24,699	686,602	672,283	513,827	813,305	487,381	777,015	703,030	629,750	785,704	764,670	814,446	7,672,712
2006	803,113	727,993	809,364	140,144	595,443	770,419	782,941	767,228	762,976	810,519	789,597	815,426	8,375,163
2007	671,526	721,771	813,052	783,583	730,587	737,500	778,000	773,888	729,209	257,055	308,886	799,486	8,104,543
2008	757,807	743,262	800,446	770,955	799,700	832,578	862,659	871,601	860,030	902,398	869,708	921,243	10,091,387
2009	855,022	825,367	911,077	263,684	679,837	862,526	885,863	878,842	853,536	891,235	879,025	914,282	10,300,296
2010	765,423	809,049	911,765	877,368	895,324	822,055	831,709	844,884	838,150	408,089	510,716	924,010	10,238,542
2011	919,626	831,385	808,303	879,215	892,573	858,932	871,746	881,276	855,497	899,898	874,339	902,101	10,374,891
2012	878,316	848,841	791,251	340,533	594,656	853,737	871,018	876,844	829,707	878,175	883,671	904,492	10,251,241
2013	914,205	827,610	907,077	874,360	886,881	668,132	837,103	854,923	823,981	287,290	558,600	630,224	9,070,386
2014	919,839	825,825	914,414	847,519	868,463	863,348	886,510	888,798	670,116	900,108	882,693	906,183	10,274,816
2015	917,393	829,649	913,179	270,902	490,415	856,500	886,966	888,369	783,639	838,786	831,313	902,246	9,409,357
2016	921,225	856,236	902,298	879,864	900,264	792,864	874,325	854,733	845,312	368,909	485,027	922,386	10,603,443
2017	922,838	803,073	919,471	880,453	906,404	858,883	884,885	888,186	862,083	899,012	883,631	918,414	10,527,333
2018	907,483	820,511	891,748	309,780	512,548	838,328	863,982	877,862	837,917	899,675	883,910	902,940	10,346,684
2019	917,439	827,695	799,826	789,936	889,877	845,495	825,291	707,050	665,519	306,391	239,821	912,606	8,726,946
2020	917,551	847,706	900,179	874,618	901,899	853,131	876,312	876,467	861,334	895,442	875,086	912,972	10,492,697
2021	908,276	776,285	748,728	432,368	316,686	729,351	742,366	883,171	854,256	896,553	881,934	910,083	9,080,057
2022	914,263	828,822	904,471	872,788	893,694	682,467	861,953	828,951	661,902	9,968	824,274	915,123	9,198,676
2023	912,648	819,705	907,429	850,217	711,323	856,205	853,821	863,123	838,514	767,233	872,162	686,043	9,938,423
2024	817,057	823,971	778,153	43,437	421,868	815,639	878,287	881,264	836,419	892,279	868,666	909,400	8,966,440
2025	907,696	819,199	899,779	868,710	885,488	852,266	855,295	833,159	610,152	-10,789	766,364	917,763	9,205,082
2026	918,592	647,047	631,930	866,414	892,387	854,098	864,778	810,733					--

== Seismic risk ==
The Nuclear Regulatory Commission's estimate of the risk each year of an earthquake intense enough to cause core damage to the reactor at Hope Creek was 1 in 357,143, according to an NRC study published in August 2010.

== Gallery ==
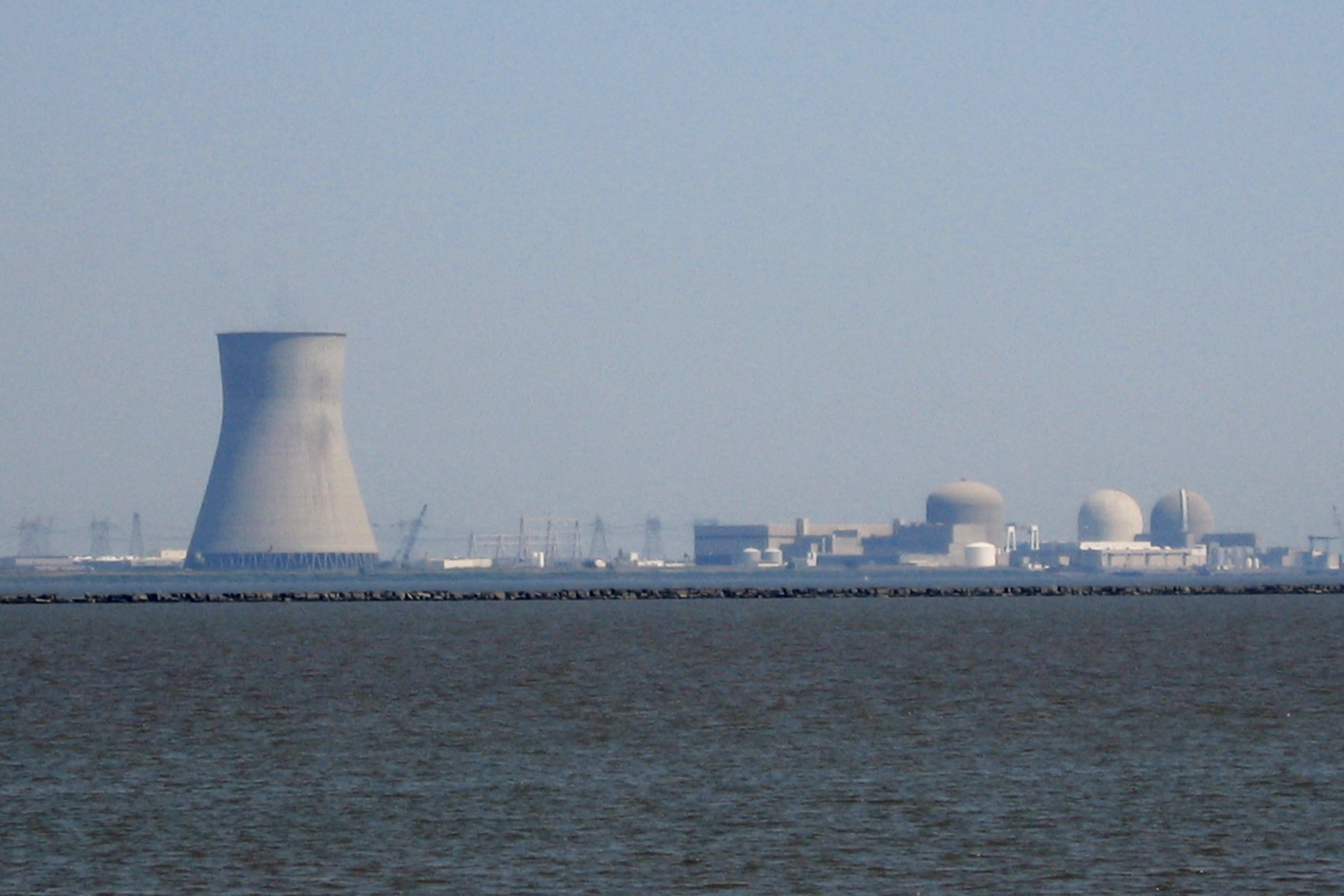
The entire PSE&G nuclear complex as seen from Augustine Beach, Delaware

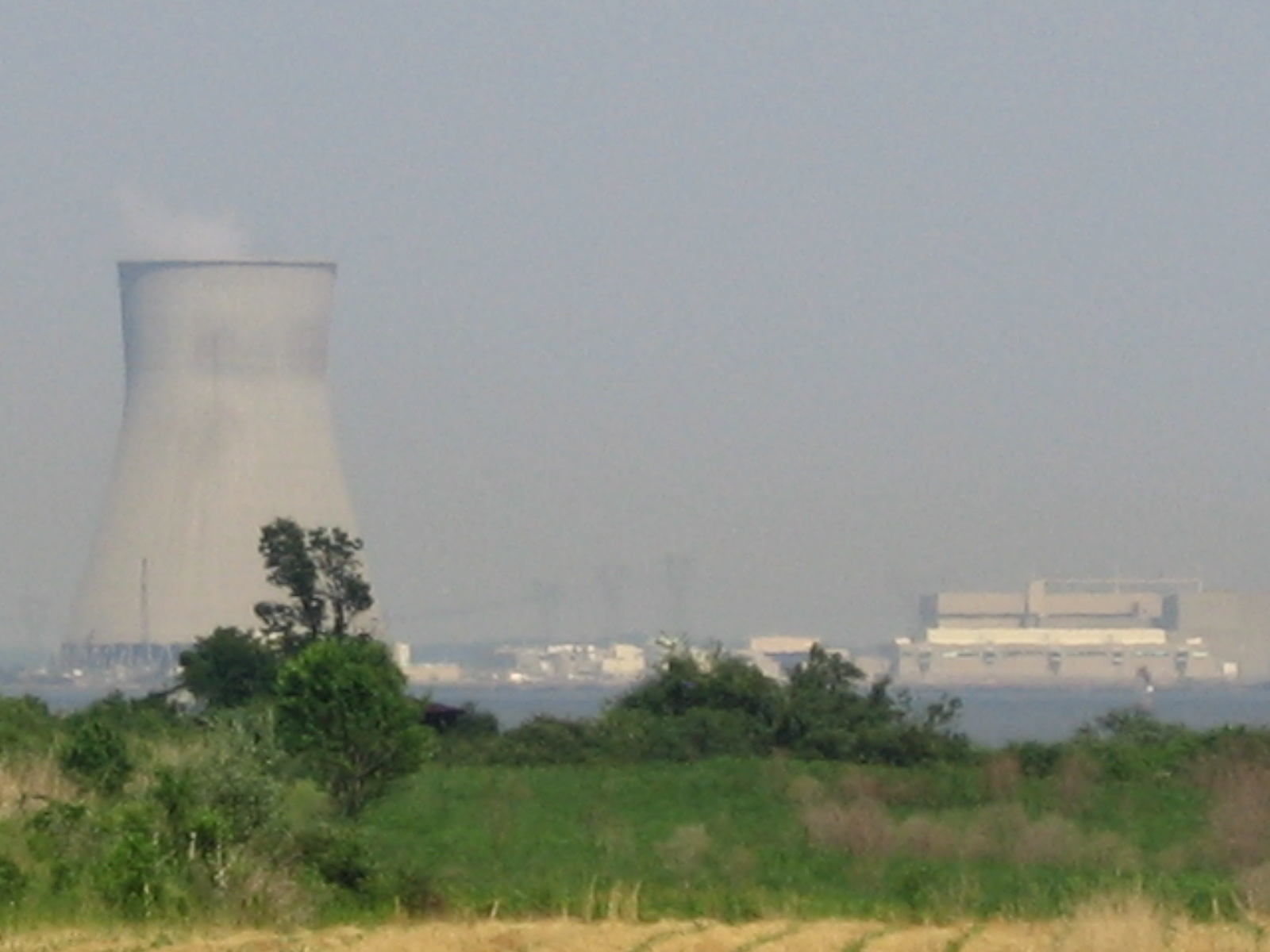
The Hope Creek portion of the complex

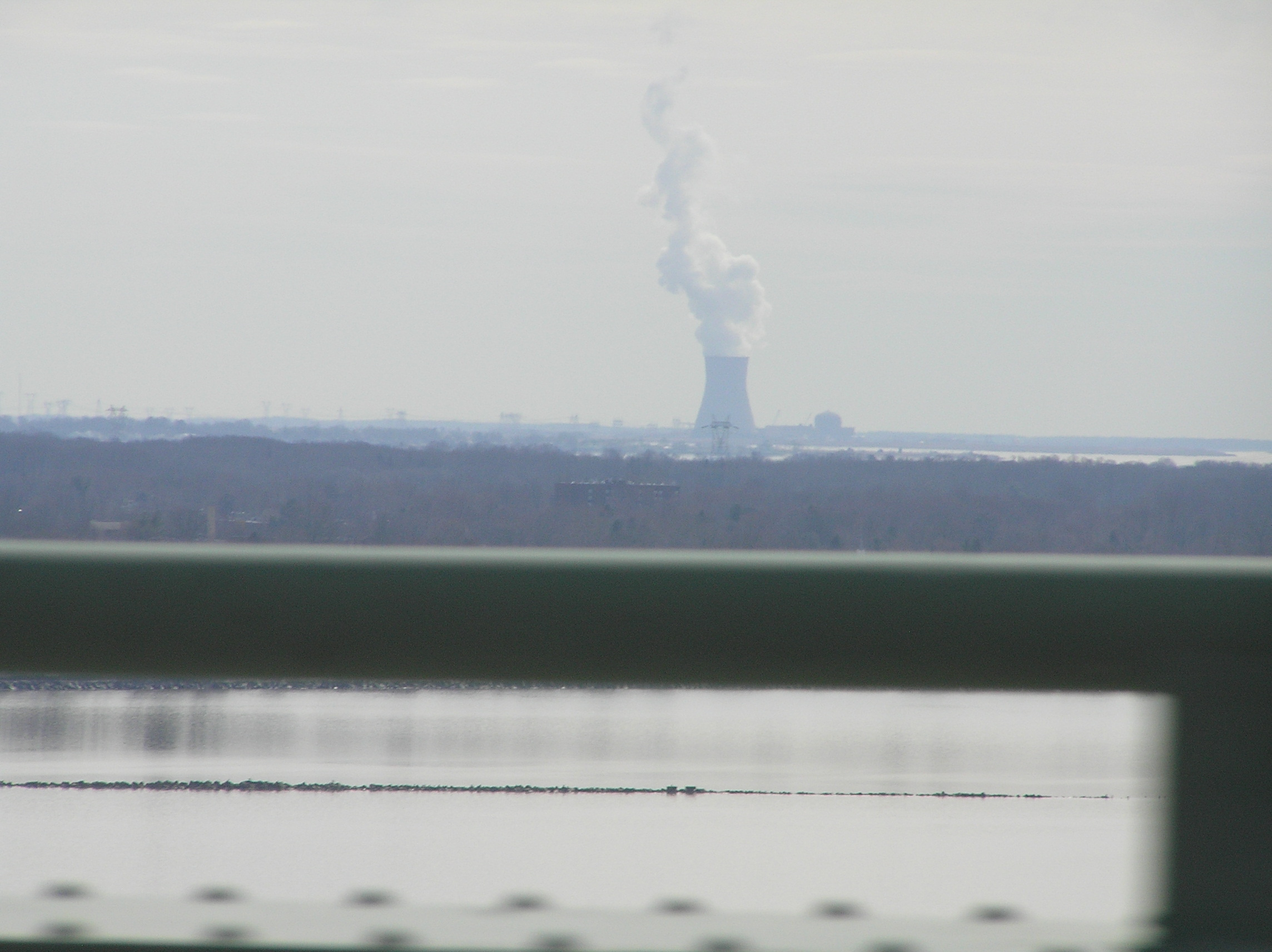
View of Salem/Hope Creek Nuclear Power Plant from the Delaware Memorial Bridge
(I-295/US 40)

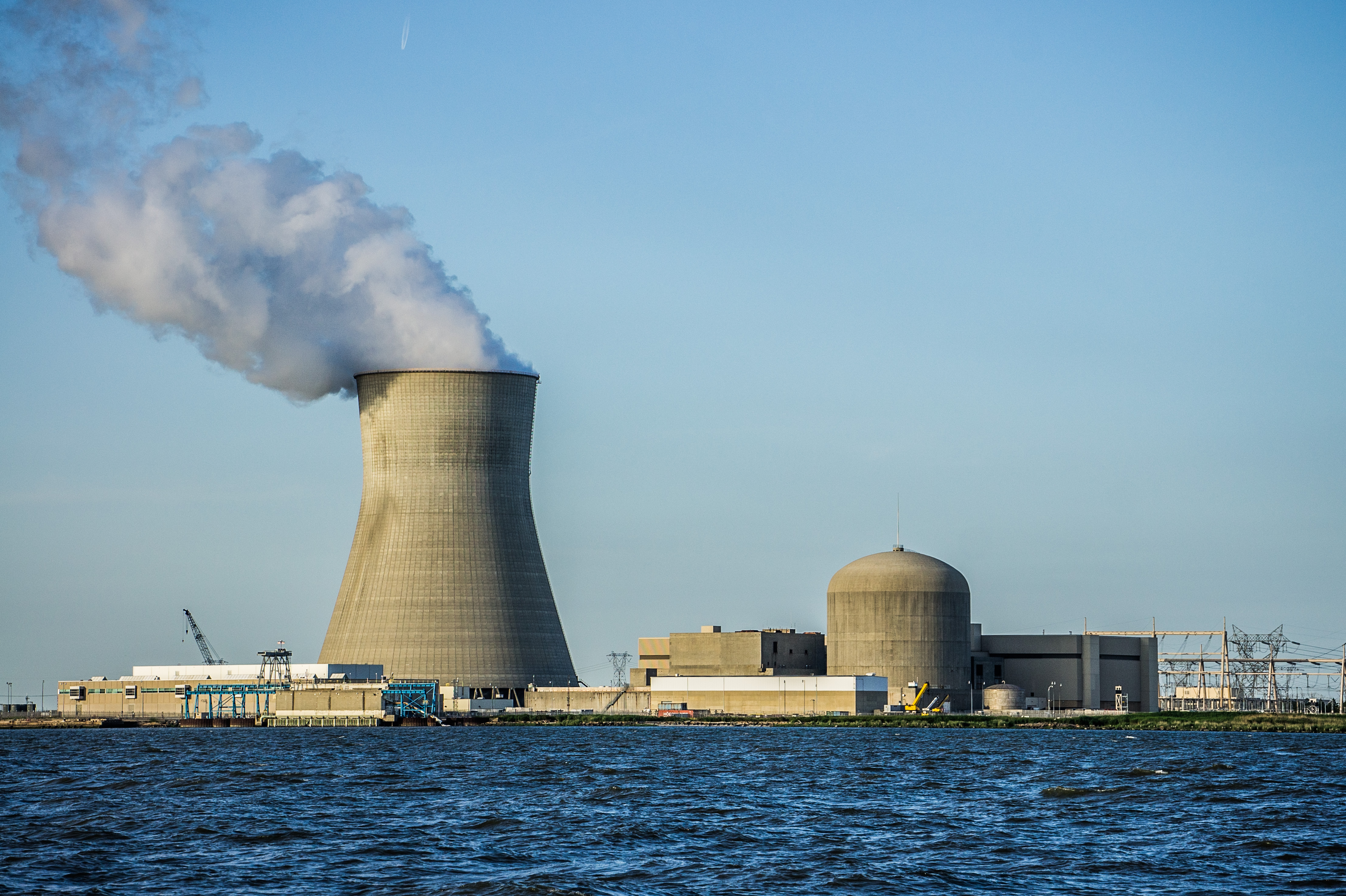
Hope Creek Nuclear Generating Station from Delaware River, May 2012
