= John H. Griscom =

American physician and sanitarian

John Hoskins Griscom (August 14, 1809 - April 28, 1874) was an influential American medical doctor and sanitarian who made significant contributions to public health reform in 19th-century New York City. Born in New York to John Griscom, an educator and chemist, he received his medical education at the University of Pennsylvania, earning his M.D. in 1832.

== Career ==
Griscom held several important positions throughout his career: Assistant physician (1833) and later physician (1834) at the New York Dispensary); Professor of chemistry at the College of Pharmacy in New York (1836-1838); Physician at the New York Hospital (1843-1870); City inspector and head of the New York City Health Department (1842); and Commissioner of Emigration (1848-1851).

== Public health ==
His most significant work, "The Sanitary Condition of the Laboring Population of New York" (1845), correlated higher morbidity rates among the working class with their poor living conditions in overcrowded, unventilated tenements. This report was instrumental in laying the foundation for urban public health reform in the United States. Griscom's approach to public health was progressive for his time. He refused to blame the poor for their living conditions, instead focusing on systemic issues such as lack of fresh water and adequate sanitation. His efforts contributed to the passage of the Metropolitan Health Act of 1866, which established a Board of Health for New York City and served as a model for other cities nationwide. Throughout his life, Griscom remained committed to improving public health through education, legislation, and reform. His ideas influenced later reformers and contributed to the development of tenement reform laws in the late 19th century.
