= A. M. P. V. H. Dickeson =

American politician from New Jersey (1843-1879)

Auxencico Maria Pena Venezuela Hildreth Dickeson (1843 — June 15, 1879), also known as Oxie Dickeson, was an American politician who represented Salem County in the New Jersey State Assembly from 1865 to 1866.

== Early life ==
Dickeson was born in Hancock's Bridge, New Jersey. He graduated from Princeton University and Albany Law School, after which he joined the Republican Party.

== Name ==
Historian Andy Osterdahl has reported being informed by one of Dickeson's descendants that the name is the result of Dickeson's father having wanted to honor a friend, Auxencico Maria Pena, who was a Venezuelan national; "Hildreth" was Dickeson's mother's maiden name.
