= New York High School =

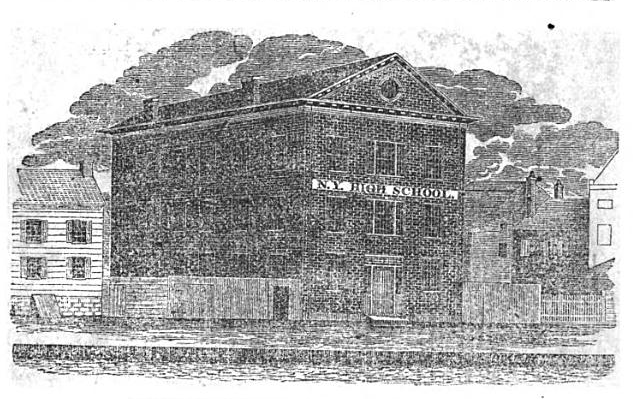
- New York High School (1829)

Location
- Crosby Street; Manhattan, NY; United States

Information
- Type: Private
- Established: 1825-1831

New York High School was the first monitorial system high school in the United States. It opened in March 1825 under the leadership of educator John Griscom, and was modeled on Edinburgh high school in Scotland. The school buildings were located on the west side of Crosby Street between Grand Street and Spring Street in Manhattan.

After completing a three-story building of 50 by 75 feet, the school opened for boys its first year. A female building opened the following year, to the north. Existing schools opposed the new institution, and its much lower tuition rates.

In addition to Griscom, educator and Baptist minister Daniel H. Barnes (1785-1828) was a key instructor. As of 1828, the school had 730 students. Although it had initial success, the school's popularity declined and it was sold in 1831.

== Legacy ==
The boys' building was sold to the Society of Mechanics and Tradesmen, which moved its headquarters and school on Chambers Street to the new location. During a cholera outbreak in 1832, the building was used as a hospital. In 1845, the Society purchased an adjoining narrow lot fronting Broadway, upon which it built the entrance corridor of what became Mechanic's Hall, a popular home for minstrel performances, with the former high school lot serving as the performance space. The Society held onto the original high school property and Broadway-linking plot until 1945.

In 1835, the College of Physicians and Surgeons purchased the girls' high school building, and opened in the new location in 1837, and remained there until 1856.
