= George Washington Moore =

British actor

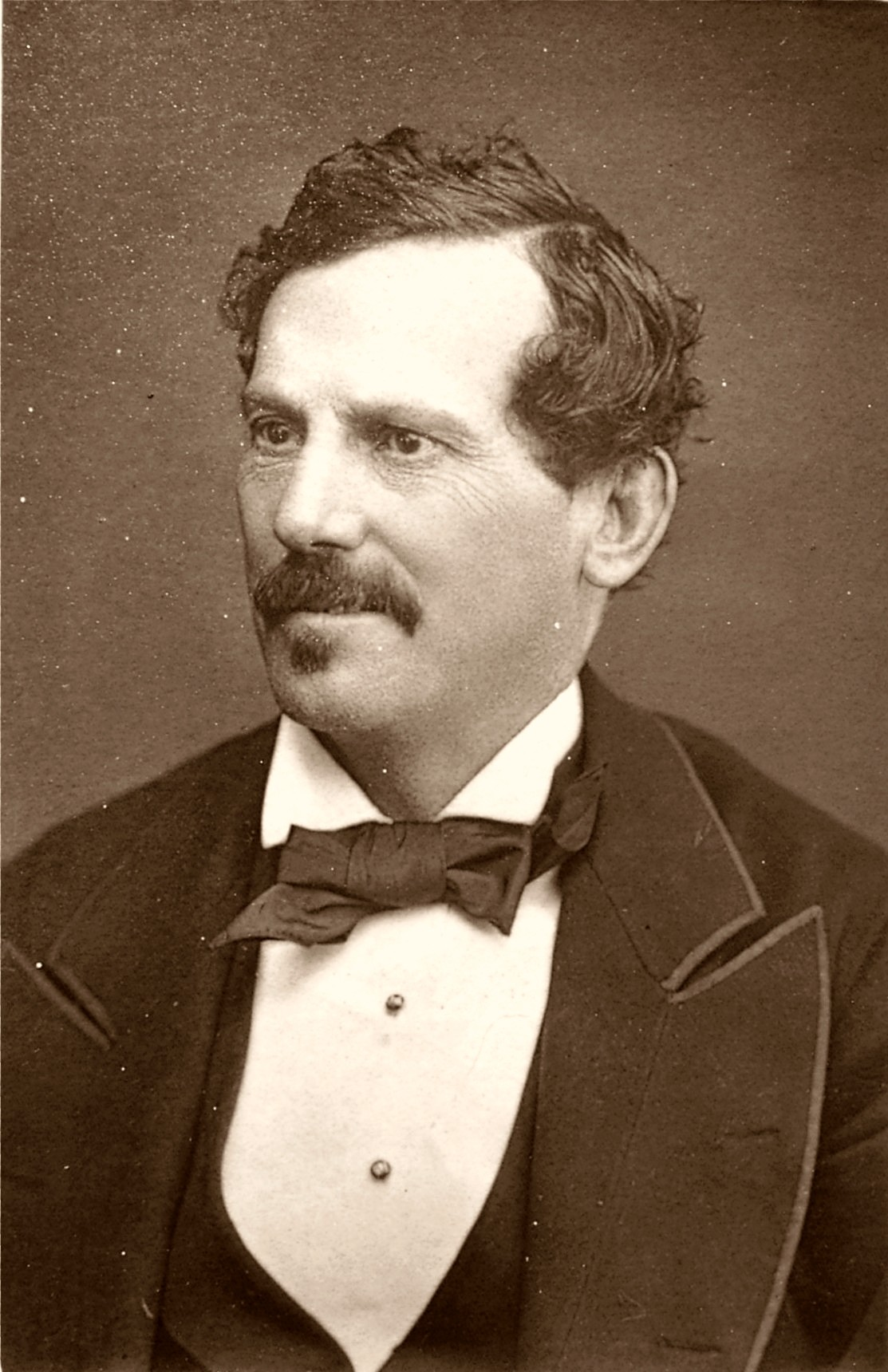
George Washington Moore

George Washington "Pony" Moore (February 22, 1820 – October 1, 1909) was a New York-born British music hall impresario.

Moore was born in New York, February 22, 1820, according to his own account the son of a bass drummer who had served under George Washington, for whom he was named. He allegedly acquired his nickname 'Pony' as a boy because of his small size; another source attributes it to his having been employed in several circuses as a driver, managing up to forty horses at one time Having first run away to the circus at age 16 he debuted in blackface in 1841 with Welch and Delevan at the Broadway Circus in New York. Moore eventually joined the Virginia Serenaders in 1844, appearing with them as a negro minstrel at the Halfway House theatre, Broadway, and later in the same capacity with other troupes. While struggling to establish himself fully in his stage career he worked as a cabinet maker and also appeared in a knife-throwing act.

On June 11, 1859, Moore sailed to England, where minstrelsy had become widely popular, and there joined the Christy Minstrels before in 1864 founding a Christy Minstrels company of his own. He was a member of the St. James's Hall Minstrels and, in 1871, founded the Moore and Burgess Minstrels with his partner Frederick Burgess.

In 1873 his eldest daughter, the actress Martha Isabella 'Bella' Moore (1854–1913), married the actor and dancer Fred Vokes in London; the marriage proved to be a tumultuous one and she was petitioning for divorce at the time of her husband's death in 1888. Another daughter, Victoria Alexandra Moore (1870–1911), married the boxer Charley Mitchell.

He died in London, England on October 1, 1909.
