= Concert Saloon Bill of 1862 =

In 1862 in New York City, "concert saloons" were the fare for evening entertainment for the male population of the thriving metropolis. To cut down on the growing decadence and crime that came with it, the Concert Saloon Bill was passed to rein in loose morality in the city.
