= Christy's Minstrels =

American blackface minstrel troupe

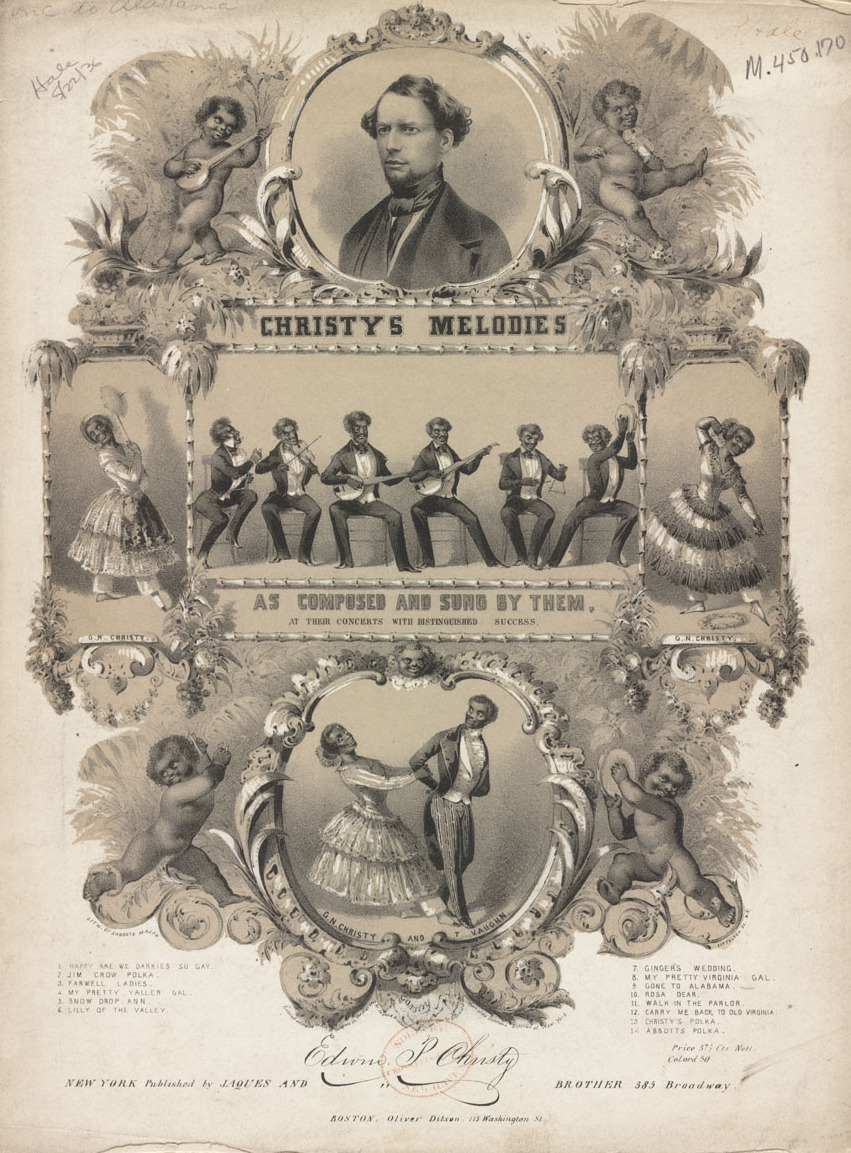
1844 sheet music cover for a collection of songs by Christy's Minstrels. E. P. Christy appears in the circle at top.

Christy's Minstrels, sometimes referred to as the Christy Minstrels, were a blackface group formed by Edwin Pearce Christy, a well-known ballad singer, in 1843, in Buffalo, New York. They were instrumental in the solidification of the minstrel show into a fixed three-act form. The troupe also invented or popularized "the line", the structured grouping that constituted the first act of the standardized three-act minstrel show, with the interlocutor in the middle and "Mr. Tambo" and "Mr. Bones" on the ends.

== Early years ==
In 1846 they first performed in Polmer's Opera House in New York City. From March 1847, they ran for a seven-year stint at New York City's Mechanics' Hall (until July 1854).

After performing at a benefit performance for Stephen Foster in Cincinnati, Ohio, on August 25, 1847, the group specialized in performances of Foster's works. Foster sold his song "Old Folks at Home" to Christy for his exclusive use. The troupe's commercial success was phenomenal: Christy paid Foster for the exclusive rights to the song.

Besides Christy himself, the troupe originally included Christy's stepson George Christy, often considered the greatest blackface comic of the era. When by September 1855 George and Edwin Christy had retired from the group, the company continued under the name of 'Christy's Minstrels', until Edwin Christy took out an injunction to prevent them. Edwin Christy was emotionally affected by the American Civil War, and committed suicide in 1862.

== In Britain and Ireland ==
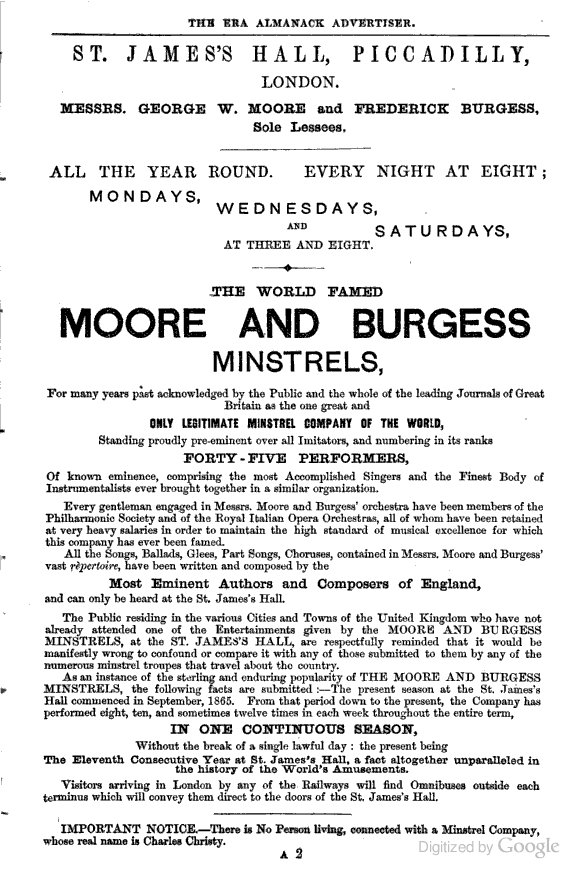
1874 Advertisement

J. W. Raynor and Earl Pierce formed a new troupe, using many of the former Christy Minstrel members. It opened in London, England, as "Raynor & Pierce's Christy Minstrels" at the St. James's Theatre on 3 August 1857. They then performed at the Surrey Theatre and later the "Polygraphic Hall" on King William Street, where they appeared for ten months. "Nellie Grey" by Michael Balfe, as sung by Raynor, became popular. In 1859, the troupe moved to the St. James's Hall (Liverpool), performing for another four months and then touring the British provinces. It then returned to Polygraphic Hall, disbanding in August 1860. The success of this troupe led to the phrase "Christy Minstrels" coming to mean any blackface minstrel show. Soon, four new companies were formed, each claiming to be the "original" Christy Minstrels, because they each boasted one or two former members of the old troupe. One group played in Dublin at the Chester Theatre in 1864, moving to London at the Standard Theatre in Shoreditch in 1865. The Dublin performances were evidently popular enough that James Joyce mentions them in his short story collection Dubliners and alludes to them on the opening page of Finnegans Wake. Three months later, it moved to St. James's Hall, where it began a run of 35 years until 1904. Eventually, the original members of that troupe retired or died, leaving only "Pony" Moore and Frederic Burgess surviving into the 1870s. Therefore, the troupe changed its name to the "Moore & Burgess's Minstrels". Other groups continued to use the title "Christy", but historian Frank Andrews describes their quality as poor. Some of them continued to perform into the twentieth century.

George Orwell, in The Road to Wigan Pier (published 1937), describes a coal miner's "Christy-minstrel face, completely black except for very red lips."

== Performance style ==
Christy's novel three-part shows began with a "walkaround", the company marching onto the stage singing and dancing. A staple of the walkaround was the cakewalk, which white audiences loved despite not realizing that it originated with plantation slaves imitating their masters' walks. The troupe was then seated in a semicircle, with one member on each end playing the tambourine or the bones. The endmen were named Brother Tambo and Brother Bones, and they engaged in an exchange of jokes between the group's songs and dances. It was customary for Tambo to be slim and Bones to be fat. A character called Mr. Interlocutor sat in the middle of the group, acting as the master of ceremonies. As the interlocutor took his place in the middle of the semicircle he uttered the time-honored phrase: "Gentlemen, be seated. We will commence with the overture." During the performance he conducted himself in a dignified manner that contrasted well with the behavior of the rowdy endmen.

Part two (the "olio") was the variety section, a precursor to vaudeville. It included singers, dancers, comedians and other novelty acts, as well as parodies of legitimate theater. A preposterous stump speech served as the highlight of this act, during which a performer spoke in outrageous malapropisms as he lectured. The performer's demeanor was meant to be reminiscent of the hilarious pomposity of Zip Coon; he aspired to great wisdom and intelligence, but his hilarious mangling of language always made him appear foolish and ignorant.

Part three ended the show with a one-act play, typically a vignette of carefree life on the plantation. After Uncle Tom's Cabin was published in 1852 and the play became famous, minstrel shows appropriated the major characters for sketches that changed the abolitionist themes in the original into an argument for the supposedly benign character of slavery.

== New Christy Minstrels ==
The New Christy Minstrels, a folk group from the 1960s, were named with reference to this group, but they did/do not perform in blackface.
