= Lower Alloways Creek Township, New Jersey =

Township in Salem County, New Jersey, US

- Township
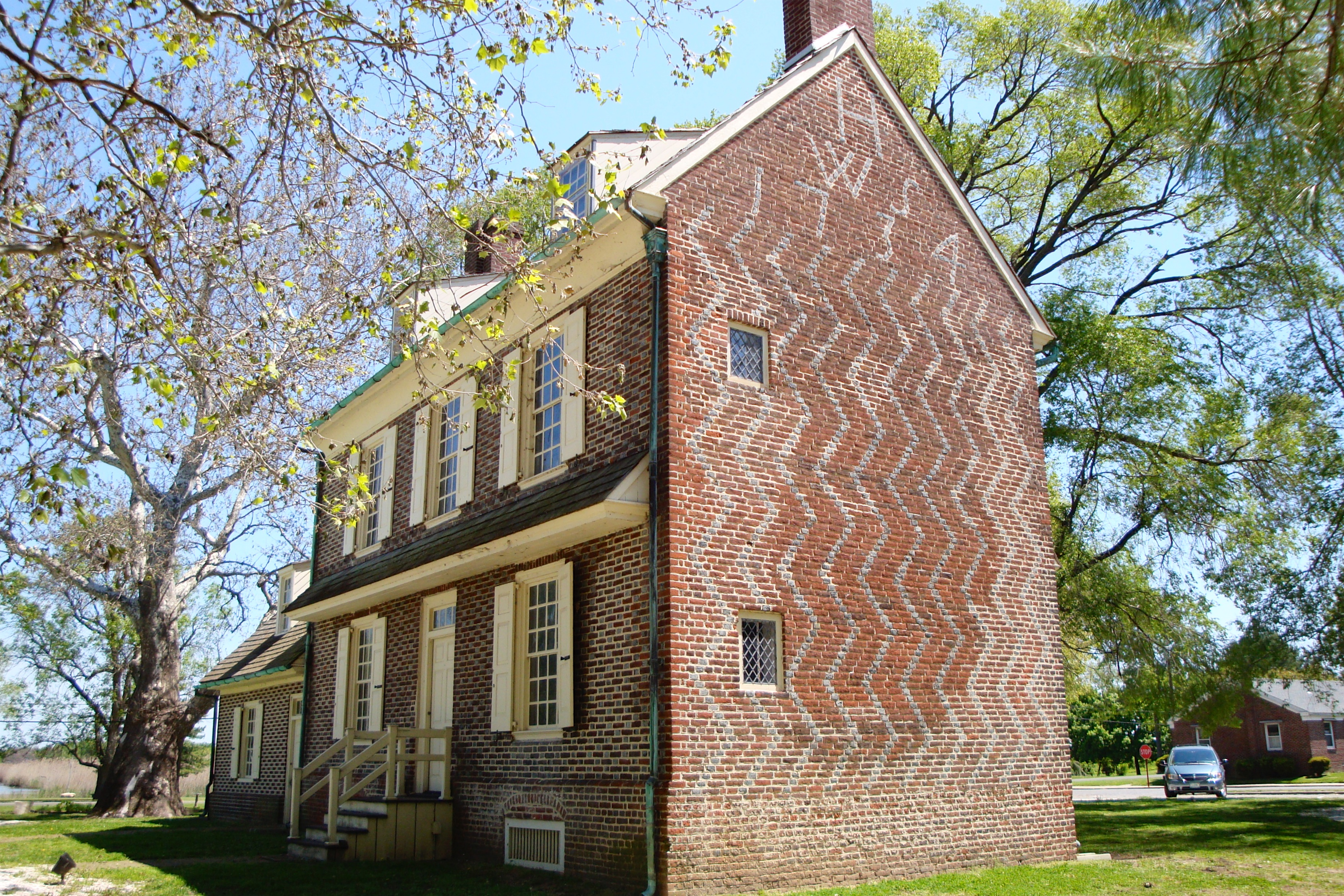
- Hancock House in the Hancock's Bridge section of the township

- Seal
- Motto: The Heart of South Jersey
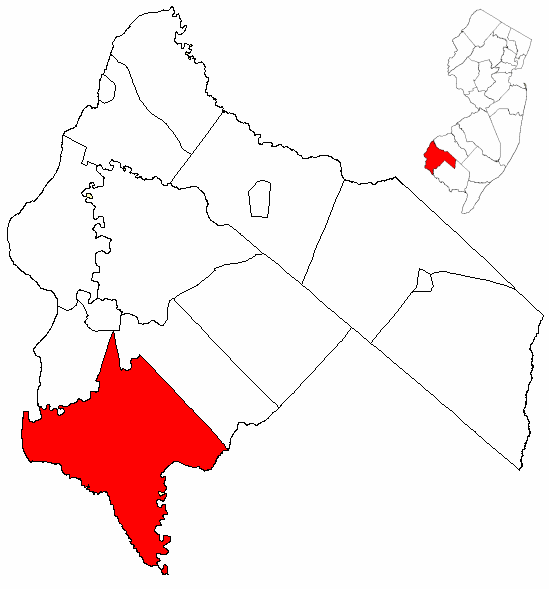
- Lower Alloways Creek Township highlighted in Salem County. Inset map: Salem County highlighted in the State of New Jersey.

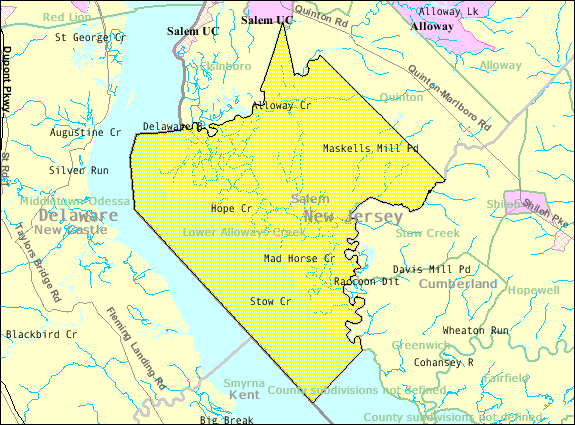
- Census Bureau map of Lower Alloways Creek Township, New Jersey

- Location in Salem County Location in New Jersey Location in the United States
- Coordinates: 39.450506°N 75.457741°W
- Country: United States
- State: New Jersey
- County: Salem
- Formed: June 17, 1767
- Incorporated: February 21, 1798

Government
  - Type: Township
  - Body: Township Committee
  - Mayor: Paul M. Collier (R, term ends December 31, 2024)
  - Municipal clerk: Ronald L. Campbell Sr.

Area
  - Total: 72.53 sq mi (187.84 km^{2})
  - Land: 45.31 sq mi (117.35 km^{2})
  - Water: 27.22 sq mi (70.49 km^{2}) 37.53%
  - Rank: 14th of 565 in state 1st of 15 in county
- Elevation: 3 ft (0.91 m)

Population (2020)
  - Total: 1,717
  - Estimate (2023): 1,736
  - Rank: 500th of 565 in state 12th of 15 in county
  - Density: 37.9/sq mi (14.6/km^{2})
  - Rank: 557th of 565 in state 15th of 15 in county
- Time zone: UTC−05:00 (Eastern (EST))
  - Summer (DST): UTC−04:00 (Eastern (EDT))
- ZIP Code: 08038 – Hancock's Bridge
- Area code: 856 exchanges: 339, 935
- FIPS code: 3403341640
- GNIS feature ID: 0882065
- Website: www.lowerallowayscreek-nj.gov

Lower Alloways Creek Township is a township in Salem County, in the U.S. state of New Jersey. As of the 2020 United States census, the township's population was 1,717, a decrease of 53 (−3.0%) from the 2010 census count of 1,770, which in turn reflected a decline of 81 (−4.4%) from the 1,851 counted in the 2000 census.

PSE&G operates three nuclear reactors in Lower Alloways Creek Township. Salem 1 and Salem 2 are pressurized water reactors at the Salem Nuclear Power Plant and the Hope Creek Nuclear Generating Station has one boiling water reactor. Lower Alloways Creek Township is a dry town where alcohol cannot be sold legally.

== History ==
Lower Alloways Creek Township was formed on June 17, 1767, when Alloways Creek Township was subdivided and Upper Alloways Creek Township (now Alloway Township) was also formed. The township was incorporated by the New Jersey Legislature's Township Act of 1798 on February 21, 1798, as one of New Jersey's original group of 104 townships. The name Alloway is derivative of Allowas, a local Native American chief.

== Geography ==
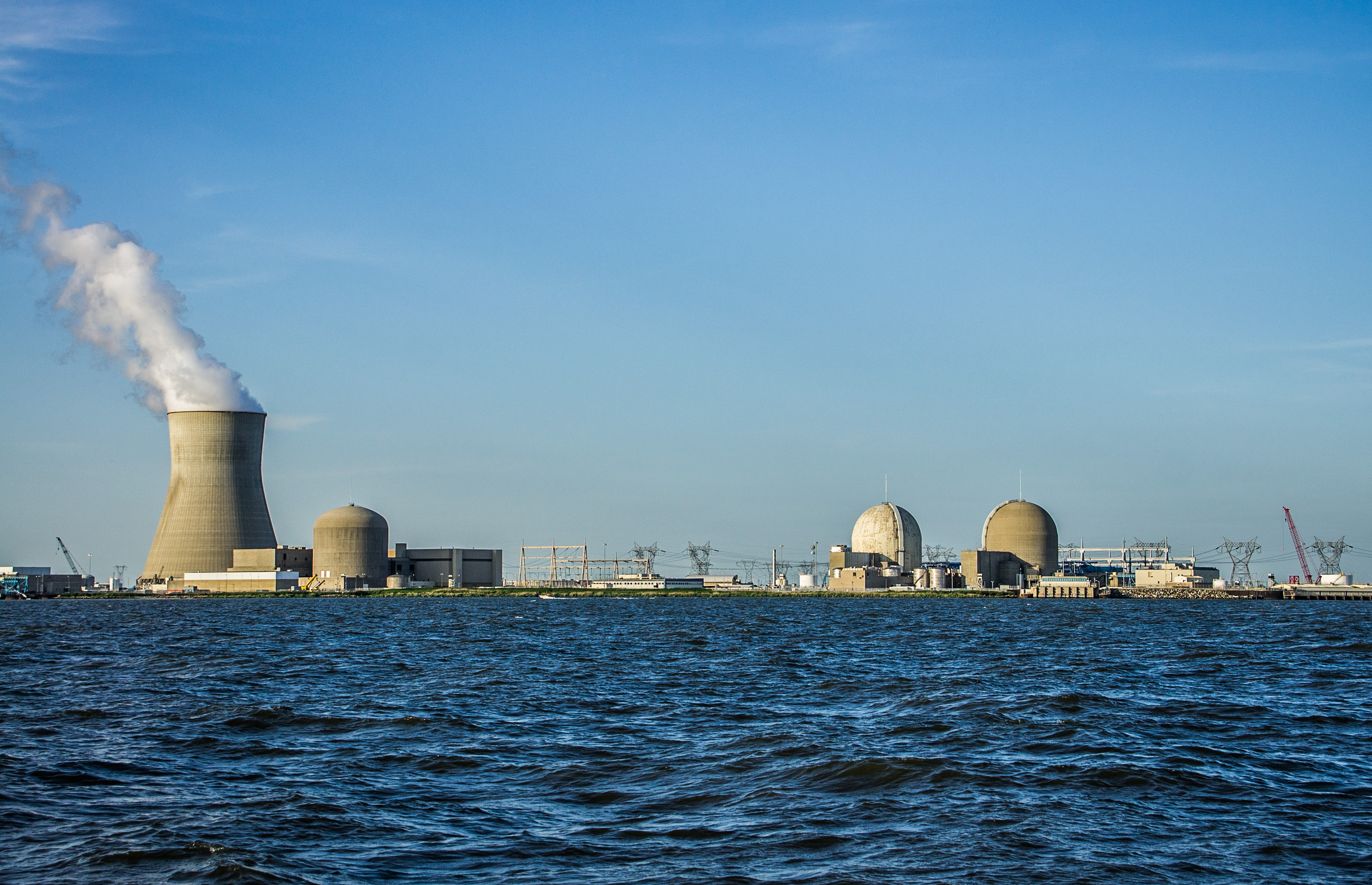
The Hope Creek (left) and Salem (right) nuclear power plants as seen from the Delaware River

According to the United States Census Bureau, the township had a total area of 72.53 square miles (187.84 km^{2}), including 45.31 square miles (117.35 km^{2}) of land and 27.22 square miles (70.49 km^{2}) of water (37.53%).

Hancock's Bridge (with a 2020 Census population of 155) is an unincorporated community and census-designated place (CDP) located within Lower Alloways Creek Township, and home to the township's municipal building, police station and a post office.

The township includes the great majority of Artificial Island, the northern tip of which is crossed east-westward by the New Jersey-Delaware state line, so it borders a tiny portion of New Castle County, Delaware, which is one of two areas of land of Delaware (and New Castle County) that is east of the Delaware River, the other being Finns Point, also part of New Castle County, DE, adjacent to Pennsville Township.

Other unincorporated communities, localities and place names located partially or completely within the township include Alder Cove, Arnold Point, Canton, Cumberland, Harmersville, Haskells Mills, Maskellers Mill, New Bridge and Woods Landing.

The township borders the Salem County municipalities of Elsinboro Township, Quinton Township and Salem. Lower Alloways Creek Township also borders the Delaware Bay, Cumberland County and a small point of land that is located within Delaware's Twelve-Mile Circle.

== Demographics ==
Historical population
Census	Pop.	Note	%±
1810	1,182		—
1820	1,217		3.0%
1830	1,223		0.5%
1840	1,252		2.4%
1850	1,423		13.7%
1860	1,471		3.4%
1870	1,483		0.8%
1880	1,373		−7.4%
1890	1,308		−4.7%
1900	1,242		−5.0%
1910	1,252		0.8%
1920	1,084		−13.4%
1930	1,063		−1.9%
1940	1,124		5.7%
1950	1,307		16.3%
1960	1,293		−1.1%
1970	1,400		8.3%
1980	1,547		10.5%
1990	1,858		20.1%
2000	1,851		−0.4%
2010	1,770		−4.4%
2020	1,717		−3.0%
2023 (est.)	1,736		1.1%
Population sources: 1810–2000; 1810–1920 1840 1850–1870; 1850 1870 1880–1890; 1890–1910 1910–1930; 1940–2000 2000; 2010 2020

=== 2010 census ===
The 2010 United States census counted 1,770 people, 679 households, and 503 families in the township. The population density was 39.1 inhabitants per square mile (15.1/km^{2}). There were 727 housing units at an average density of 16.1 per square mile (6.2/km^{2}). The racial makeup was 96.95% (1,716) White, 1.36% (24) Black or African American, 0.28% (5) Native American, 0.17% (3) Asian, 0.00% (0) Pacific Islander, 0.11% (2) from other races, and 1.13% (20) from two or more races. Hispanic or Latino of any race were 1.53% (27) of the population.

Of the 679 households, 27.4% had children under the age of 18; 62.2% were married couples living together; 8.5% had a female householder with no husband present and 25.9% were non-families. Of all households, 20.8% were made up of individuals and 10.5% had someone living alone who was 65 years of age or older. The average household size was 2.60 and the average family size was 3.03.

21.8% of the population were under the age of 18, 7.8% from 18 to 24, 22.1% from 25 to 44, 31.0% from 45 to 64, and 17.3% who were 65 years of age or older. The median age was 44.2 years. For every 100 females, the population had 96.0 males. For every 100 females ages 18 and older there were 94.7 males.

The Census Bureau's 2006–2010 American Community Survey showed that (in 2010 inflation-adjusted dollars) median household income was $66,384 (with a margin of error of +/− $3,808) and the median family income was $72,969 (+/− $7,867). Males had a median income of $46,964 (+/− $6,435) versus $43,083 (+/− $8,815) for females. The per capita income for the borough was $27,325 (+/− $2,057). About none of families and 1.8% of the population were below the poverty line, including none of those under age 18 and 3.0% of those age 65 or over.

=== 2000 census ===
As of the 2000 United States census there were 1,851 people, 693 households, and 537 families residing in the township. The population density was 39.6 inhabitants per square mile (15.3/km^{2}). There were 730 housing units at an average density of 15.6 per square mile (6.0/km^{2}). The racial makeup of the township was 96.38% White, 2.16% African American, 0.11% Native American, 0.65% Asian, 0.16% from other races, and 0.54% from two or more races. Hispanic or Latino people of any race were 0.49% of the population.

There were 693 households, out of which 31.7% had children under the age of 18 living with them, 66.7% were married couples living together, 7.5% had a female householder with no husband present, and 22.4% were non-families. 18.2% of all households were made up of individuals, and 8.9% had someone living alone who was 65 years of age or older. The average household size was 2.67 and the average family size was 3.00.

In the township the population was spread out, with 24.4% under the age of 18, 6.2% from 18 to 24, 29.3% from 25 to 44, 26.1% from 45 to 64, and 13.9% who were 65 years of age or older. The median age was 40 years. For every 100 females, there were 93.4 males. For every 100 females age 18 and over, there were 94.2 males.

The median income for a household in the township was $55,078, and the median income for a family was $59,653. Males had a median income of $44,081 versus $30,313 for females. The per capita income for the township was $21,962. About 4.2% of families and 7.3% of the population were below the poverty line, including 14.7% of those under age 18 and 3.1% of those age 65 or over.

== Government ==
=== Local government ===
Lower Alloways Creek Township is governed under the Township form of New Jersey municipal government, one of 141 municipalities (of the 564) statewide that use this form, the second-most commonly used form of government in the state. The Township Committee is comprised of five members, who are elected directly by the voters at-large in partisan elections to serve three-year terms of office on a staggered basis, with either one or two seats coming up for election each year as part of the November general election in a three-year cycle. At an annual reorganization meeting, the Township Committee selects one of its members to serve as mayor and another as deputy mayor.

As of 2024 members of the Lower Alloways Creek Township Committee are Mayor Paul M. Collier (R, 2025, term as mayor ends 2024), Deputy Mayor Timothy W. Bradway (R, 2024; term as deputy mayor ends 2024), Laura Tice Crane (R, 2024), Jeffrey P. Palombo (R, 2025) and Richard W. Venable Sr. (R, 2026).

In 2018, the township had an average property tax bill of $2,157, the lowest in the county, compared to an average bill of $5,711 in Salem County and $8,767 statewide.

=== Federal, state and county representation ===
Lower Alloways Creek Township is located in the 2nd Congressional District and is part of New Jersey's 3rd state legislative district.

For the 119th United States Congress, New Jersey's 2nd congressional district is represented by Jeff Van Drew (R, Dennis Township). New Jersey is represented in the United States Senate by Democrats Cory Booker (Newark, term ends 2027) and Andy Kim (Moorestown, term ends 2031).

For the 2026–2027 session, the 3rd legislative district of the New Jersey Legislature is represented in the State Senate by John Burzichelli (D, Paulsboro) and in the General Assembly by David Bailey (D, Woodstown) and Heather Simmons (D, Glassboro).

Salem County is governed by a five-member Board of County Commissioners who are elected at-large to serve three-year terms of office on a staggered basis, with either one or two seats coming up for election each year. At an annual reorganization meeting held in the beginning of January, the board selects a Director and a Deputy Director from among its members. As of 2025, Salem County's Commissioners (with party, residence, and term-end year listed in parentheses) are:

Director Benjamin H. Laury (R, Elmer, 2027), Deputy Director Cordy Taylor (R, Oldmans Township, 2028), Paul Collier (R, Lower Alloways Creek, 2027), Ed Ramsey (R, Pittsgrove Township, 2026), and Daniel Timmerman (R, Elmer, 2028).

Constitutional officers elected on a countywide basis are: Clerk Dale A. Cross (R, Pennsville Township, 2029), Sheriff Charles M. Miller (R, Salem, 2027) and Surrogate Gordon J. Ostrum Jr. (R, Pilesgrove Township, 2030).

=== Politics ===
As of March 2011, there were a total of 1,302 registered voters in Lower Alloways Creek Township, of which 461 (35.4% vs. 30.6% countywide) were registered as Democrats, 337 (25.9% vs. 21.0%) were registered as Republicans and 503 (38.6% vs. 48.4%) were registered as Unaffiliated. There was one voter registered to another party. Among the township's 2010 Census population, 73.6% (vs. 64.6% in Salem County) were registered to vote, including 94.1% of those ages 18 and over (vs. 84.4% countywide).

Gubernatorial election results for Lower Alloways Creek Township
Year	Republican		Democratic		Third party(ies)	
Year	No.	%	No.	%	No.	%
2025	620	77.11%	178	22.14%	6	0.75%
2021	613	81.41%	128	17.00%	12	1.59%
2017	400	63.19%	190	30.02%	43	6.79%
2013	597	78.86%	150	19.82%	10	1.32%
2009	438	54.75%	248	31.00%	114	14.25%
2005	469	55.97%	318	37.95%	51	6.09%

In the 2012 presidential election, Republican Mitt Romney received 65.7% of the vote (620 cast), ahead of Democrat Barack Obama with 33.2% (313 votes), and other candidates with 1.2% (11 votes), among the 1,153 ballots cast by the township's 1,313 registered voters (209 ballots were spoiled), for a turnout of 87.8%. In the 2008 presidential election, Republican John McCain received 657 votes (65.2% vs. 46.6% countywide), ahead of Democrat Barack Obama with 316 votes (31.4% vs. 50.4%) and other candidates with 23 votes (2.3% vs. 1.6%), among the 1,007 ballots cast by the township's 1,323 registered voters, for a turnout of 76.1% (vs. 71.8% in Salem County). In the 2004 presidential election, Republican George W. Bush received 761 votes (70.0% vs. 52.5% countywide), ahead of Democrat John Kerry with 313 votes (28.8% vs. 45.9%) and other candidates with 9 votes (0.8% vs. 1.0%), among the 1,087 ballots cast by the township's 1,358 registered voters, for a turnout of 80.0% (vs. 71.0% in the whole county).

United States presidential election results for Lower Alloways Creek Township 2024 2020 2016 2012 2008 2004
Year	Republican		Democratic		Third party(ies)	
Year	No.	%	No.	%	No.	%
2024	782	78.59%	203	20.40%	10	1.01%
2020	846	78.55%	211	19.59%	20	1.86%
2016	750	74.63%	211	21.00%	44	4.38%
2012	620	65.68%	313	33.16%	11	1.17%
2008	657	65.96%	316	31.73%	23	2.31%
2004	761	70.27%	313	28.90%	9	0.83%

In the 2013 gubernatorial election, Republican Chris Christie received 78.9% of the vote (597 cast), ahead of Democrat Barbara Buono with 19.8% (150 votes), and other candidates with 1.3% (10 votes), among the 772 ballots cast by the township's 1,330 registered voters (15 ballots were spoiled), for a turnout of 58.0%. In the 2009 gubernatorial election, Republican Chris Christie received 438 votes (53.5% vs. 46.1% countywide), ahead of Democrat Jon Corzine with 248 votes (30.3% vs. 39.9%), Independent Chris Daggett with 95 votes (11.6% vs. 9.7%) and other candidates with 19 votes (2.3% vs. 2.0%), among the 819 ballots cast by the township's 1,328 registered voters, yielding a 61.7% turnout (vs. 47.3% in the county).

United States Senate election results for Lower Alloways Creek Township1
Year	Republican		Democratic		Third party(ies)	
Year	No.	%	No.	%	No.	%
2024	746	75.13%	225	22.66%	22	2.22%
2018	610	77.81%	145	18.49%	29	3.70%
2012	492	54.13%	393	43.23%	24	2.64%
2006	495	57.56%	330	38.37%	35	4.07%

United States Senate election results for Lower Alloways Creek Township2
Year	Republican		Democratic		Third party(ies)	
Year	No.	%	No.	%	No.	%
2020	795	74.65%	230	21.60%	40	3.76%
2014	449	61.26%	246	33.56%	38	5.18%
2013	238	70.41%	94	27.81%	6	1.78%
2008	496	51.72%	428	44.63%	35	3.65%

== Education ==
The Lower Alloways Creek Township School District serves students in pre-kindergarten through eighth grade at Lower Alloways Creek Elementary School. As of the 2021–22 school year, the district, comprised of one school, had an enrollment of 143 students and 19.5 classroom teachers (on an FTE basis), for a student–teacher ratio of 7.3:1. In the 2016–17 school year, Lower Alloways Creek Township had the 32nd smallest enrollment of any school district in the state, with 159 students.

Public school students in ninth through twelfth grades attend Salem High School in Salem City, together with students from Elsinboro Township, Mannington Township and Quinton Township, as part of a sending/receiving relationship with the Salem City School District. As of the 2021–22 school year, the high school had an enrollment of 399 students and 39.0 classroom teachers (on an FTE basis), for a student–teacher ratio of 10.2:1.

== Transportation ==
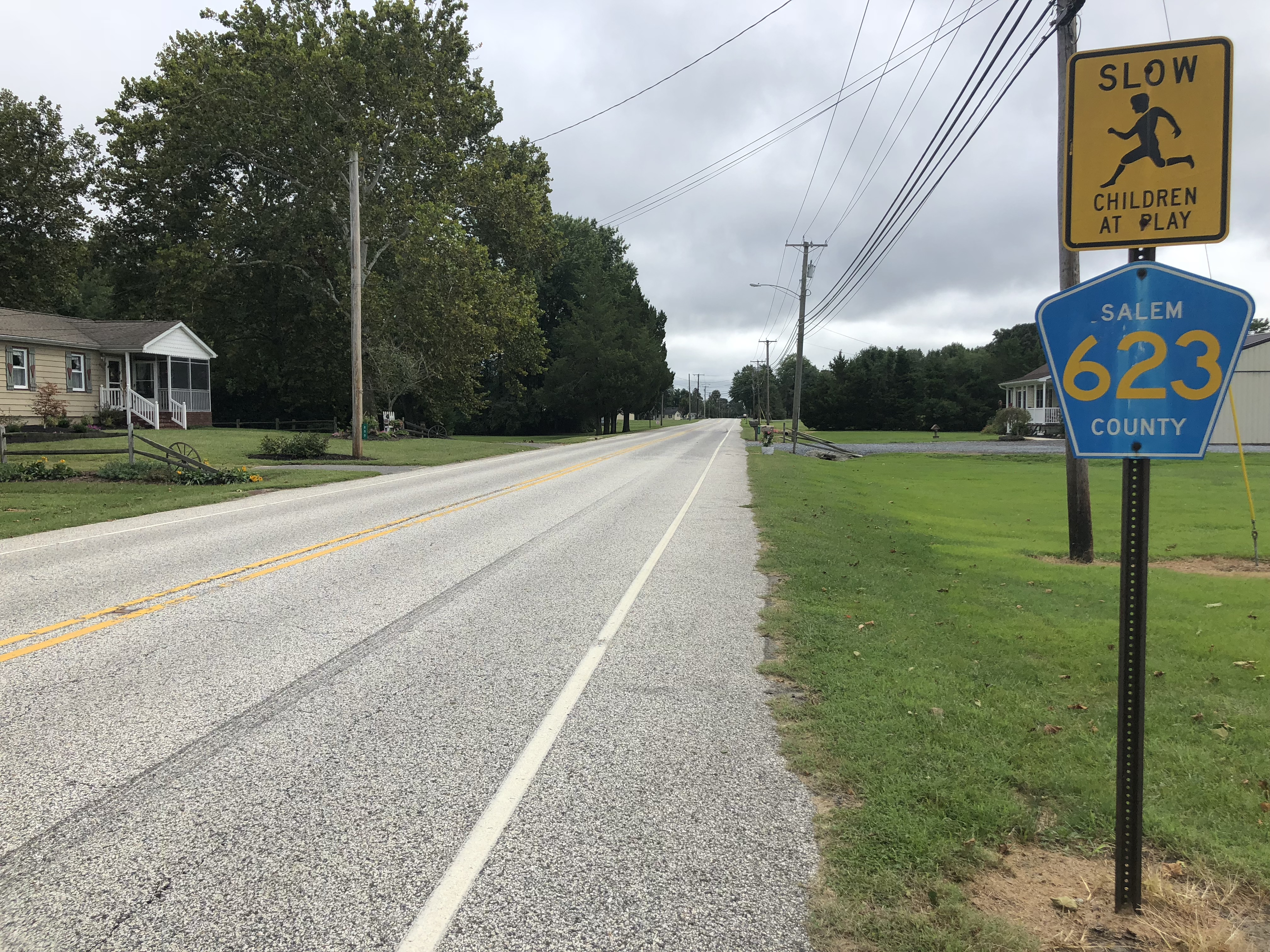
Main Street/Hamersville–Canton Road (County Route 623) in Lower Alloways Creek Township

As of May 2010, the township had a total of 49.78 miles (80.11 km) of roadways, of which 27.18 miles (43.74 km) were maintained by the municipality and 22.60 miles (36.37 km) by Salem County.

No Interstate, U.S., state or major county highways pass through Lower Alloways Creek Township. The only numbered roads are minor county routes, such as County Route 623.

Route 45 and Route 49 are the closest state highways, and are accessible in neighboring municipalities. The closest limited access roads, Interstate 295 and the New Jersey Turnpike, are accessible two towns away in Pennsville Township.

== Notable people ==
People who were born in, residents of, or otherwise closely associated with Lower Alloways Creek Township include:

- A. M. P. V. H. Dickeson (1843-1879), politician who represented Salem County in the New Jersey General Assembly from 1865 to 1866
- John Griscom (1774–1852), educator, chemist and philanthropist
- Cornelia Hancock (1840–1927), volunteer nurse who served the injured and infirmed of the Union Army during the American Civil War
- William Hancock, judges. Hancock Sr. commissioned Hancock House in 1734. Hancock Jr. was killed in 1778 in the Hancock's Bridge massacre
- Thomas Jones Yorke (1801–1882), Whig Party politician who served two terms in the United States House of Representatives
