= Hancock House (Lower Alloways Creek Township, New Jersey) =

Historic house in New Jersey, United States

- U.S. National Register of Historic Places
- New Jersey Register of Historic Places
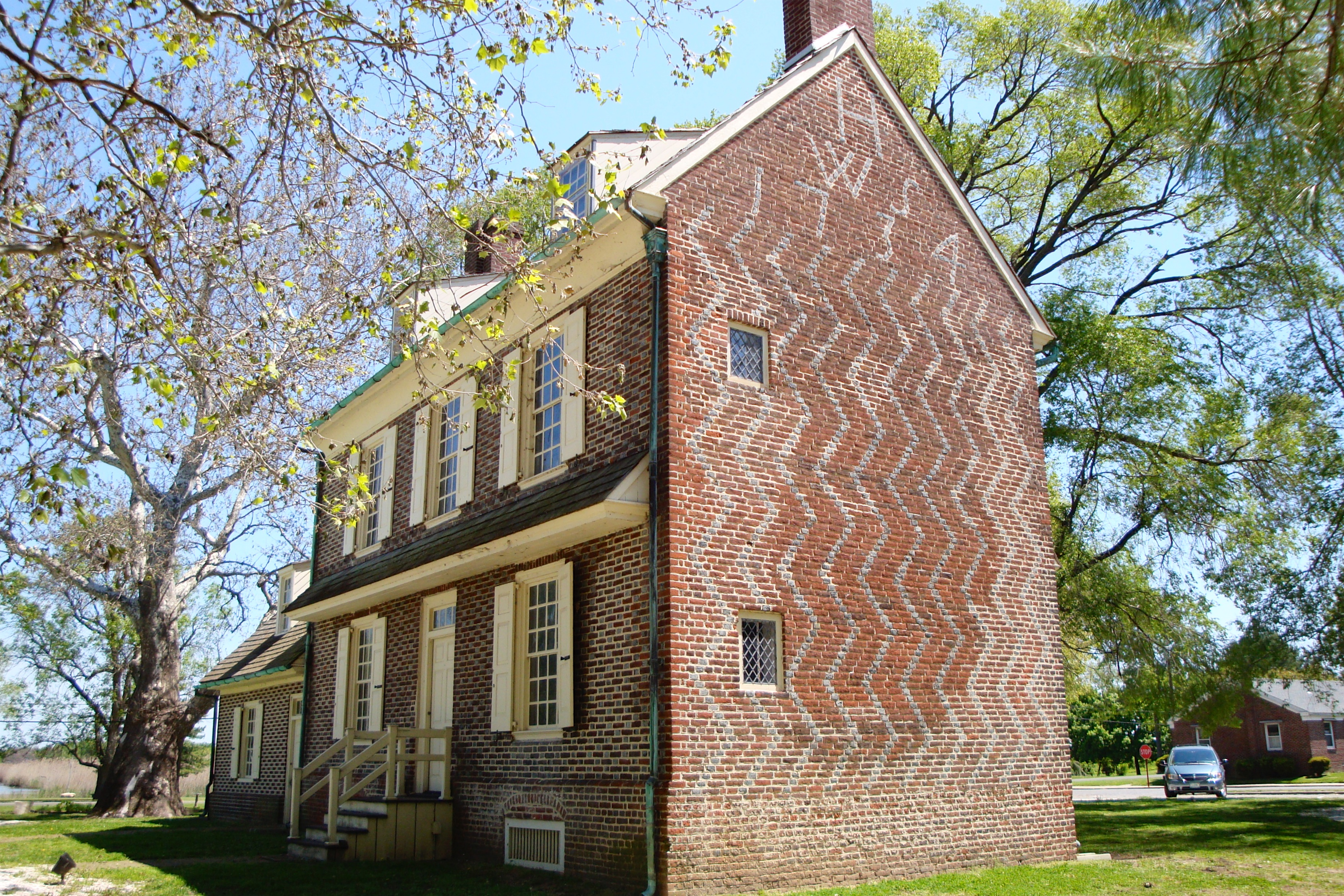
- Hancock House, in 2010

- Location within Salem County, New Jersey Location within New Jersey Location within the United States
- Location: 3 Front St., Lower Alloways Creek Township, New Jersey
- Coordinates: 39°30′27″N 75°27′38″W
- Area: 2.5 acres (1.0 ha)
- Built: 1734
- NRHP reference No.: 70000393
- NJRHP No.: 2433

Significant dates
- Added to NRHP: December 18, 1970
- Designated NJRHP: September 11, 1970

The Hancock House is a historic structure in the Hancock's Bridge section of Lower Alloways Creek Township, Salem County, New Jersey, United States. It was the site of the 1778 Hancock's Bridge massacre. The site is on the National Register of Historic Places.

== History ==
The house was built in 1734 for Judge William and Sarah Hancock and features Flemish bond brickwork detailed with blue-glazed bricks, which gives the year of construction (1734) and the initials of the couple for whom it was built: W S for William and Sarah. William died in 1762 and passed the house to his son William, also a judge.

== American Revolutionary War ==
During the American Revolutionary War, British forces under Lieutenant-Colonel Charles Mawhood launched a successful raid on Salem on March 18, 1778. Three days later on March 21, Major John Graves Simcoe led approximately 300 troops of the 27th Regiment of Foot and Queen's Rangers through a marsh and across Alloway Creek in a surprise attack on Hancock House. At approximately 5 a.m., they entered the house, surprising and killing between 7 and 30 American militiamen sleeping there. Simcoe's troops, reportedly exclaiming "Spare no one! Give no quarter!", allegedly killed several militiamen who were attempting to surrender and fatally injured Loyalist judge William Hancock Jr., the owner of Hancock House before American forces commandeered it, who Simcoe and his troops mistakenly believed was away from the house for the night. All remaining American soldiers in the house were captured.

== See also ==
- National Register of Historic Places listings in Salem County, New Jersey
- List of the oldest buildings in New Jersey
