= William Hancock (judge) =

American judge and politician

Judge William Hancock may refer to William Hancock Sr., or his son William Hancock Jr.

== William Hancock Sr. ==
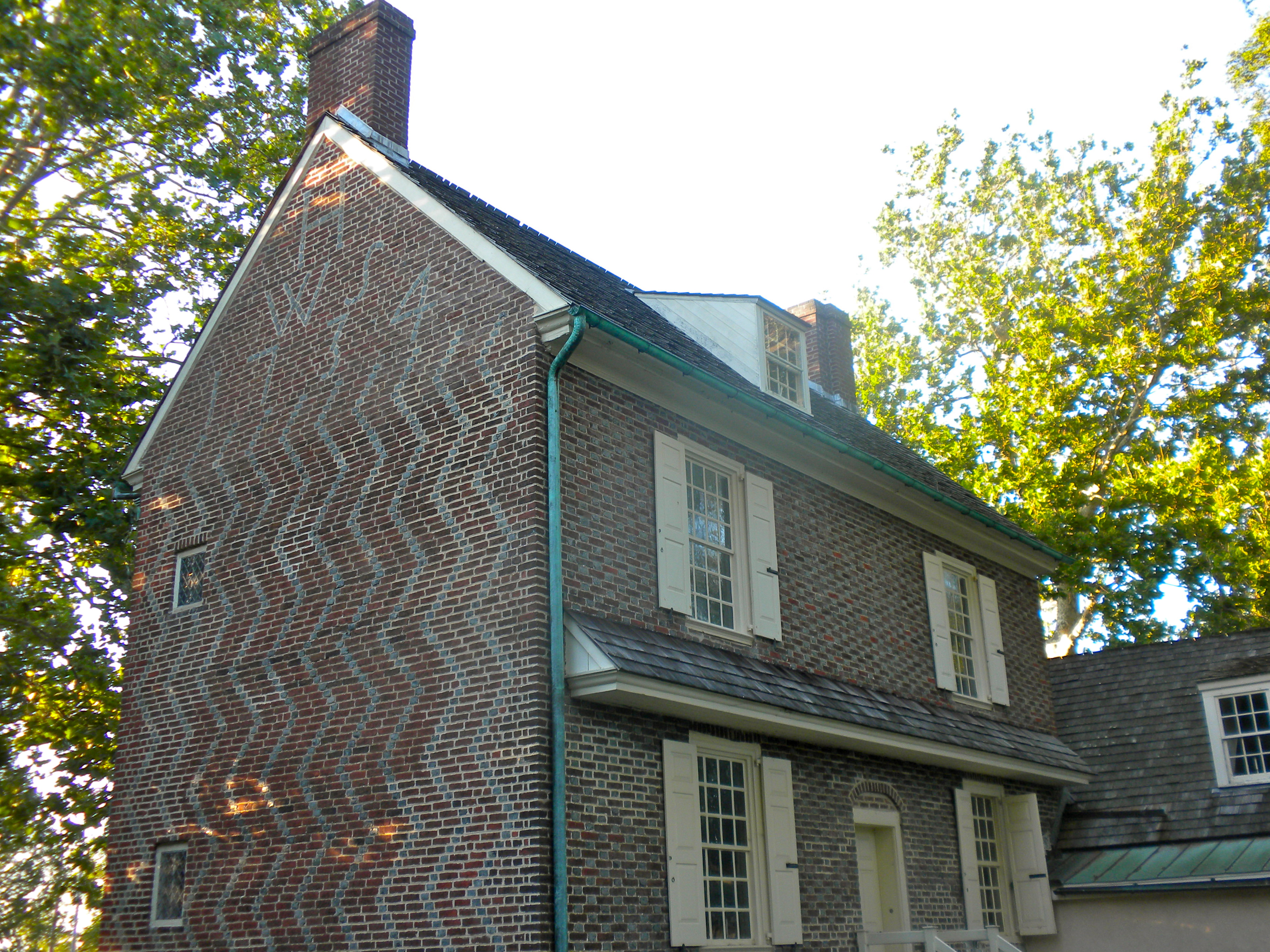
Hancock House showing western gable.

- William H. Hancock was a Justice of the Peace for the County of Salem in 1727, and a member of the colonial legislature.
- He commissioned Hancock House in 1734.
- The house was erected in 1734 for William Hancock and his wife Sarah, whose initials are woven into the gable on the west end.

	H
W		S
1734

- Died 1762

== William Hancock Jr. ==
- When William Sr. died in 1762, the house passed to his son William, who also succeeded his father in the legislature and as a Judge of the County Court of Pleas in Salem County.
- He presided over the King's Court at the Salem County Courthouse.
- He died as a result of wounds received on the night of March 21, 1778, in the Hancock's Bridge massacre.

== See also ==
- Hancock House (Lower Alloways Creek Township, New Jersey)
- Hancock's Bridge, New Jersey
- Lower Alloways Creek Township, New Jersey
- Salem County, New Jersey
- Salem, New Jersey
