= Hancock's Bridge, New Jersey =

Populated place in Salem County, New Jersey, US

- Census-designated place
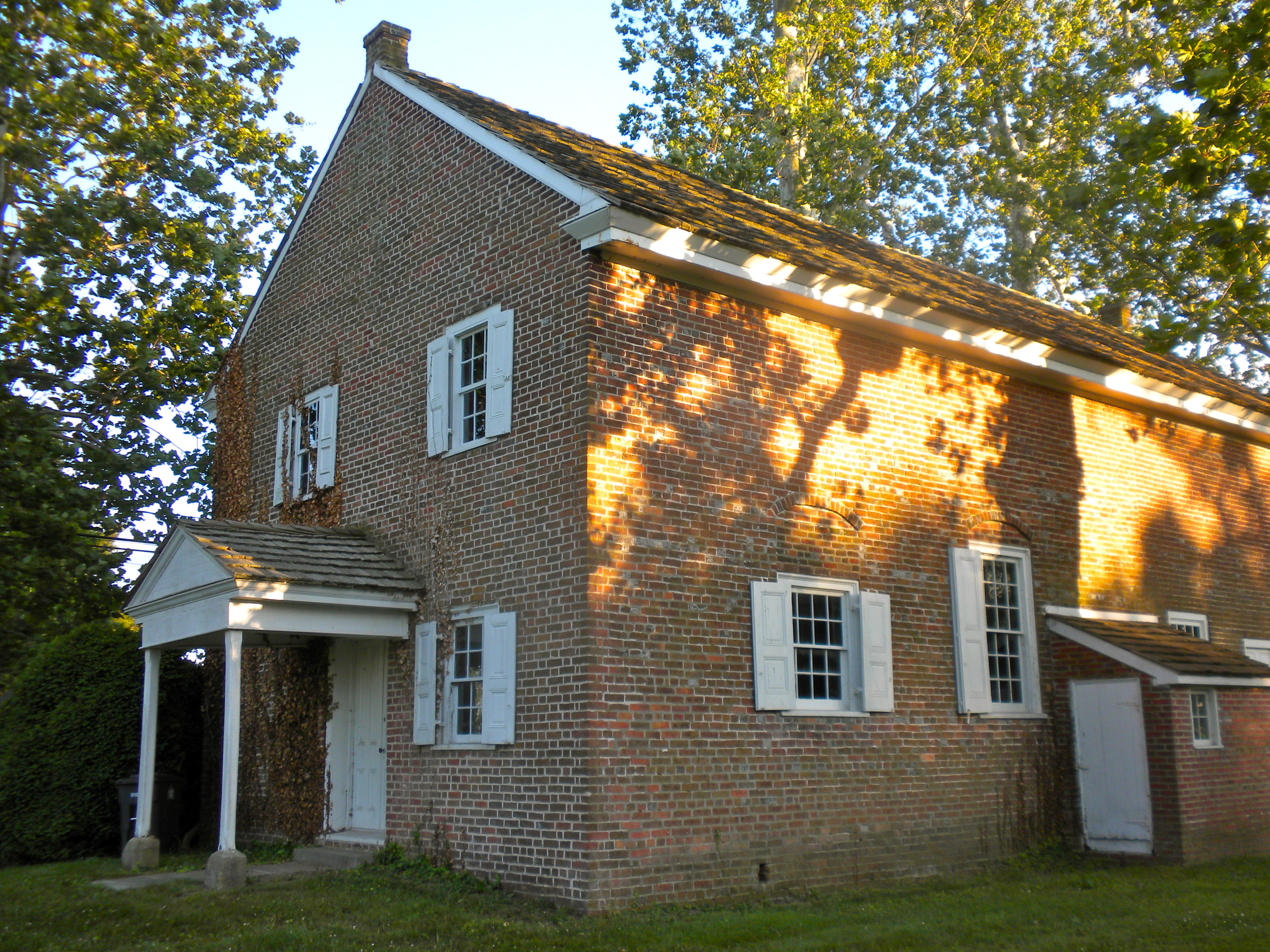
- Alloways Creek Friends Meetinghouse

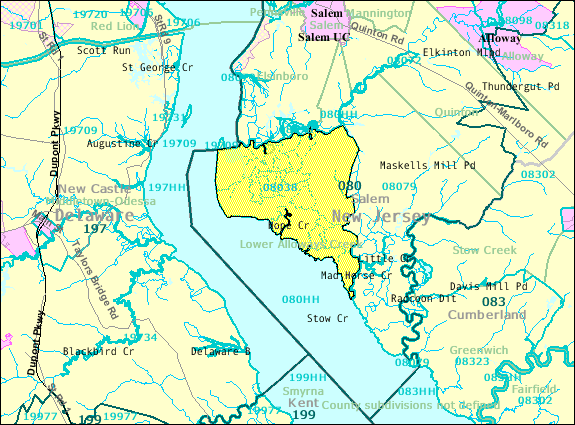
- United States Census Bureau map of ZCTA 08038 Hancock's Bridge, New Jersey

- Location in Salem County Location in New Jersey Location in the United States
- Coordinates: 39.50562°N 75.462261°W
- Country: United States
- State: New Jersey
- County: Salem
- Township: Lower Alloways Creek

Area
  - Total: 0.25 sq mi (0.64 km^{2})
  - Land: 0.23 sq mi (0.59 km^{2})
  - Water: 0.019 sq mi (0.05 km^{2}) 3.22%
- Elevation: 3.3 ft (1 m)

Population (2020)
  - Total: 155
  - Density: 680.4/sq mi (262.69/km^{2})
- Time zone: UTC−05:00 (Eastern (EST))
  - Summer (DST): UTC−04:00 (Eastern (EDT))
- ZIP Code: 08038
- Area code: 856
- FIPS code: 34-29520
- GNIS feature ID: 02583999

Hancock's Bridge (also Hancocks Bridge, without an apostrophe) is an unincorporated community and census-designated place (CDP) located within Lower Alloways Creek Township, in Salem County, in the U.S. state of New Jersey. As of the 2010 United States census, the CDP's population was 254. The area is served as United States Postal Service ZIP Code 08038.

== Geography ==
According to the United States Census Bureau, Hancocks Bridge had a total area of 0.213 square miles (0.551 km^{2}), including 0.206 square miles (0.533 km^{2}) of land and 0.007 square miles (0.018 km^{2}) of water (3.22%).

== Demographics ==
Historical population
Census	Pop.	Note	%±
2010	254		—
2020	155		−39.0%
U.S. Decennial Census; 2010 2020

Hancock's Bridge first appeared as a census designated place in the 2010 U.S. census.

=== 2020 census ===
Hancocks Bridge CDP, New Jersey – Racial and ethnic composition Note: the US Census treats Hispanic/Latino as an ethnic category. This table excludes Latinos from the racial categories and assigns them to a separate category. Hispanics/Latinos may be of any race.
Race / Ethnicity (NH = Non-Hispanic)	Pop 2010	Pop 2020	% 2010	% 2020
White alone (NH)	245	133	96.46%	85.81%
Black or African American alone (NH)	4	2	1.57%	1.29%
Native American or Alaska Native alone (NH)	0	1	0.00%	0.65%
Asian alone (NH)	3	1	1.18%	0.65%
Native Hawaiian or Pacific Islander alone (NH)	0	0	0.00%	0.00%
Other race alone (NH)	0	0	0.00%	0.00%
Mixed race or Multiracial (NH)	0	4	0.00%	2.58%
Hispanic or Latino (any race)	2	14	0.79%	9.03%
Total	254	155	100.00%	100.00%

=== 2010 census ===
The 2010 United States census counted 254 people, 93 households, and 65 families in the CDP. The population density was 1,234.2 per square mile (476.5/km^{2}). There were 103 housing units at an average density of 500.5 per square mile (193.2/km^{2}). The racial makeup was 97.24% (247) White, 1.57% (4) Black or African American, 0.00% (0) Native American, 1.18% (3) Asian, 0.00% (0) Pacific Islander, 0.00% (0) from other races, and 0.00% (0) from two or more races. Hispanic or Latino of any race were 0.79% (2) of the population.

Of the 93 households, 35.5% had children under the age of 18; 51.6% were married couples living together; 14.0% had a female householder with no husband present and 30.1% were non-families. Of all households, 25.8% were made up of individuals and 14.0% had someone living alone who was 65 years of age or older. The average household size was 2.73 and the average family size was 3.32.

26.8% of the population were under the age of 18, 10.2% from 18 to 24, 25.6% from 25 to 44, 23.2% from 45 to 64, and 14.2% who were 65 years of age or older. The median age was 39.0 years. For every 100 females, the population had 101.6 males. For every 100 females ages 18 and older there were 93.8 males.

== Historic sites ==
The Hancock House is a historic structure that was the site of the 1778 Hancock's Bridge massacre. Built in 1734 for Judge William and Sarah Hancock, the house featured a blue glazed brick pattern, which gave the year of construction, 1734, and the initials of the couple for whom it was built, 'W S' for William and Sarah. William died in 1762, and passed the house to his son William, also a judge.
