= Tri-County Conference (New Jersey) =

New Jersey athletic conference

The Tri-County Conference (TCC) is an athletic conference consisting of both public and private high schools located in Camden County, Cape May County, Cumberland County, Gloucester County and Salem County, New Jersey. The Tri-County Conference operates under the aegis of the New Jersey State Interscholastic Athletic Association.

== History ==
The conference was first established in 1928, with three divisions: Royal, Diamond, and Classic. A fourth division, Liberty, was added in 2018 to close the student disparity gap and create better competition in each division. The new division applies to all sports except Winter Track, Wrestling, Swimming, and Girls Cross-Country.

Timber Creek Regional High School announced in 2018 that they would leave the Olympic Conference and join the Tri-County Conference for the 2020–21 school year, which would have the benefit of having all three schools in the Black Horse Pike District competing in the same athletic conference.

Gloucester City Junior-Senior High School, one of the schools that had been part of the conference since its inception, left the Tri-County Conference for the Colonial Conference. The school was replaced by Overbrook High School, which returned to the Tri-County Conference after being a member of the Colonial Conference from 2008 to 2020.

Hammonton High School had been a member of the Tri-County Conference from 2014 to 2020, before returning to the Cape-Atlantic League for the 2020–21 school year.

Washington Township High School, alongside the Salem County Career and Technical High School, announced in 2021 that they would leave the Olympic Conference and join the Tri-County Conference for the 2022–23 school year.

== Member schools ==
Schools in the conference are:

School	Location	County	School district	Team name	Classification	Division
Clayton High School	Clayton	Gloucester	Clayton Public Schools	Clippers	Group I	Classic
Clearview Regional High School	Harrison Township	Gloucester	Clearview Regional High School District	Pioneers	Group IV	Royal
Cumberland Regional High School	Upper Deerfield Township	Cumberland	--	Colts	Group III	Liberty
Delsea Regional High School	Franklin Township	Gloucester	Delsea Regional School District	Crusaders	Group III	Liberty
Deptford High School	Deptford Township	Gloucester	Deptford Township Schools	Spartans	Group III	Liberty
Glassboro High School	Glassboro	Gloucester	Glassboro Public Schools	Bulldogs	Group I	Diamond
Gloucester Catholic High School	Gloucester City	Camden	Roman Catholic Diocese of Camden	Rams	Non-Public B	Classic
Gloucester County Institute of Technology	Deptford Township	Gloucester	Gloucester County Vocational-Technical School District	Cheetahs	Group IV	Royal
Highland Regional High School	Gloucester Township	Camden	Black Horse Pike Regional School District	Tartans	Group III	Liberty
Kingsway Regional High School	Woolwich Township	Gloucester	Kingsway Regional School District	Dragons	Group IV	Royal
Overbrook High School	Pine Hill	Camden	Pine Hill Schools	Rams	Group I	Diamond
Penns Grove High School	Penns Grove	Salem	Penns Grove-Carneys Point Regional School District	Red Devils	Group I	Diamond
Pennsville Memorial High School	Pennsville Township	Salem	Pennsville School District	Eagles	Group I	Diamond
Pitman High School	Pitman	Gloucester	Pitman School District	Panthers	Group I	Classic
Salem High School	Salem	Salem	Salem City School District	Rams	Group I	Classic
Salem County Career and Technical High School	Pilesgrove Township	Salem	Salem County Vocational Technical Schools	Chargers	Group II	Classic
Schalick High School	Pittsgrove Township	Salem	Pittsgrove Township School District	Cougars	Group I	Diamond
Timber Creek Regional High School	Gloucester Township	Camden	Black Horse Pike Regional School District	Chargers	Group III	Liberty
Triton Regional High School	Runnemede	Camden	Black Horse Pike Regional School District	Mustangs	Group III	Liberty
Washington Township High School	Washington Township	Gloucester	Washington Township Public School District	Minutemen/Minutemaids	Group IV	Royal
Wildwood High School	Wildwood	Cape May	Wildwood City School District	Warriors	Group I	Classic
Williamstown High School	Monroe Township	Gloucester	Monroe Township Public Schools	Braves	Group IV	Royal
Woodstown High School	Woodstown	Salem	Woodstown-Pilesgrove Regional School District	Wolverines	Group I	Diamond
