= Elsinboro Township School District =

School district in Salem County, New Jersey, US

Address
- 631 Salem-Fort Elfsborg Road Elsinboro Township, Salem County, New Jersey, 08079; United States
- Coordinates: 39.550973°N 75.518236°W

District information
- Grades: K-8
- Superintendent: Laural Kretzer
- Business administrator: Kimberly Fleetwood
- Schools: 1

Students and staff
- Enrollment: 119 (as of 2022–23)
- Faculty: 15.7 FTEs
- Student–teacher ratio: 7.6:1

Other information
- District Factor Group: DE
- Website: www.elsinboroschool.org
Ind.	Per pupil	District spending	Rank (*)	K-8 average	%± vs. average
1A	Total Spending	$16,184	10	$18,891	−14.3%
1	Budgetary Cost	10,261	2	14,159	−27.5%
2	Classroom Instruction	6,633	7	8,659	−23.4%
6	Support Services	1,253	2	2,167	−42.2%
8	Administrative Cost	1,414	11	1,547	−8.6%
10	Operations & Maintenance	901	2	1,612	−44.1%
13	Extracurricular Activities	4	1	104	−96.2%
16	Median Teacher Salary	52,897	13	61,136
Data from NJDoE 2014 Taxpayers' Guide to Education Spending. *Of K-8 districts with up to 400 students. Lowest spending=1; Highest=71

The Elsinboro Township School District is a community public school district that serves students in kindergarten through eighth grade from Elsinboro Township, in Salem County, in the U.S. state of New Jersey.

As of the 2022–23 school year, the district, comprising one school, had an enrollment of 119 students and 15.7 classroom teachers (on an FTE basis), for a student–teacher ratio of 7.6:1.

Elsinboro was one of two districts added to the Interdistrict Public School Choice Program in October 2011, opening up 100 student seats that are available to students from outside the district, who were eligible to apply to attend starting in the 2012-13 school year. As part of the program, non-resident students who are accepted attend school in the district at no cost to their parents, with tuition covered by the resident district. Available slots are announced annually by grade.

Public school students in ninth through twelfth grades attend Salem High School in Salem City, together with students from Lower Alloways Creek Township, Mannington Township and Quinton Township, as part of a sending/receiving relationship with the Salem City School District. As of the 2022–23 school year, the high school had an enrollment of 420 students and 38.0 classroom teachers (on an FTE basis), for a student–teacher ratio of 11.1:1.

== History ==
In the 2016–17 school year, Elsinboro was tied as the 18th-smallest enrollment of any school district in the state, with 129 students.

The district had been classified by the New Jersey Department of Education as being in District Factor Group "DE", the fifth-highest of eight groupings. District Factor Groups organize districts statewide to allow comparison by common socioeconomic characteristics of the local districts. From lowest socioeconomic status to highest, the categories are A, B, CD, DE, FG, GH, I and J.

== School ==
The Elsinboro Township School had an enrollment of 117 students in grades K-8 in the 2022–23 school year.

== Administration ==
Core members of the district's administration are:

- Laural Kretzer, superintendent
- Kimberly Fleetwood, business administrator and board secretary, is the administrator for the Alloway Township School District and performs the same role in Elsinboro Township as part of a shared services agreement.

== Board of education ==
The district's board of education is comprised of seven members who set policy and oversee the fiscal and educational operation of the district through its administration. As a Type II school district, the board's trustees are elected directly by voters to serve three-year terms of office on a staggered basis, with either two or three seats up for election each year held (since 2012) as part of the November general election. The board appoints a superintendent to oversee the district's day-to-day operations and a business administrator to supervise the business functions of the district.
