= Alloway Township School District =

School district in Salem County, New Jersey, US

Address
- 43 Cedar Street Alloway Township, Salem County, New Jersey, 08001; United States
- Coordinates: 39.5584°N 75.3641°W

District information
- Grades: PreK-8
- Superintendent: Amy Morley
- Business administrator: Kimberly Fleetwood
- Schools: 1

Students and staff
- Enrollment: 294 (as of 2023–24)
- Faculty: 30.5 FTEs
- Student–teacher ratio: 9.6:1

Other information
- District Factor Group: DE
- Website: allowayschool.org
Ind.	Per pupil	District spending	Rank (*)	K-8 average	%± vs. average
1A	Total Spending	$14,969	3	$18,891	−20.8%
1	Budgetary Cost	12,421	11	14,159	−12.3%
2	Classroom Instruction	7,949	17	8,659	−8.2%
6	Support Services	1,568	13	2,167	−27.6%
8	Administrative Cost	1,557	29	1,547	0.6%
10	Operations & Maintenance	1,220	9	1,612	−24.3%
13	Extracurricular Activities	113	27	104	8.7%
16	Median Teacher Salary	63,465	60	61,136
Data from NJDoE 2014 Taxpayers' Guide to Education Spending. *Of K-8 districts with up to 400 students. Lowest spending=1; Highest=71

The Alloway Township School District is a public school district that serves students in pre-kindergarten through eighth grade from Alloway Township in Salem County, in the U.S. state of New Jersey.

As of the 2023–24 school year, the district, comprised of one school, had an enrollment of 294 students and 30.5 classroom teachers (on an FTE basis), for a student–teacher ratio of 9.6:1.

The district had been classified by the New Jersey Department of Education as being in District Factor Group "DE", the fifth-highest of eight groupings. District Factor Groups organize districts statewide to allow comparison by common socioeconomic characteristics of the local districts. From lowest socioeconomic status to highest, the categories are A, B, CD, DE, FG, GH, I and J.

Students in public school for grades nine through twelve attend Woodstown High School in Woodstown, which serves students from Pilesgrove Township and Woodstown, along with students from Alloway Township, Oldmans Township and Upper Pittsgrove Township who attend the high school as part of sending/receiving relationships with the Woodstown-Pilesgrove Regional School District. As of the 2023–24 school year, the high school had an enrollment of 537 students and 52.0 classroom teachers (on an FTE basis), for a student–teacher ratio of 10.3:1.

== School ==
Alloway Township School served 289 students in grades PreK–8 in the 2023–24 school year.

== Administration ==
Core members of the district's administration are:

- Amy Morley, superintendent
- Kimberly Fleetwood, business administrator and board secretary. Allen performs the same role with the Elsinboro Township School District and the Lower Alloways Creek Township School District as part of a shared services agreement.

== Board of education ==
The district's board of education, comprised of nine members, sets policy and oversees the fiscal and educational operation of the district through its administration. As a Type II school district, the board's trustees are elected directly by voters to serve three-year terms of office on a staggered basis, with three seats up for election each year held (since 2012) as part of the November general election. The board appoints a superintendent to oversee the district's day-to-day operations and a business administrator to supervise the business functions of the district.
