= Quinton Township School District =

School district in Salem County, New Jersey, US

Address
- 8 Robinson Street Quinton Township, Salem County, New Jersey, 08072; United States
- Coordinates: 39.546219°N 75.412727°W

District information
- Grades: PreK-8
- Superintendent: Gwen Herman
- Business administrator: Karen Klaus
- Schools: 1

Students and staff
- Enrollment: 286 (as of 2023–24)
- Faculty: 30.4 FTEs
- Student–teacher ratio: 9.4:1

Other information
- District Factor Group: A
- Website: www.quintonschool.info
Ind.	Per pupil	District spending	Rank (*)	K-8 average	%± vs. average
1A	Total Spending	$16,610	13	$18,891	−12.1%
1	Budgetary Cost	11,431	8	14,159	−19.3%
2	Classroom Instruction	6,672	8	8,659	−22.9%
6	Support Services	1,441	8	2,167	−33.5%
8	Administrative Cost	1,671	39	1,547	8.0%
10	Operations & Maintenance	1,518	22	1,612	−5.8%
13	Extracurricular Activities	125	29	104	20.2%
16	Median Teacher Salary	61,547	53	61,136
Data from NJDoE 2014 Taxpayers' Guide to Education Spending. *Of K-8 districts with up to 400 students. Lowest spending=1; Highest=71

The Quinton Township School District is a comprehensive community public school district that serves students in pre-kindergarten through eighth grade from Quinton Township in Salem County, in the U.S. state of New Jersey.

As of the 2023–24 school year, the district, comprised of one school, had an enrollment of 286 students and 30.4 classroom teachers (on an FTE basis), for a student–teacher ratio of 9.4:1.

The district had been classified by the New Jersey Department of Education as being in District Factor Group "A", the lowest of eight groupings. District Factor Groups organize districts statewide to allow comparison by common socioeconomic characteristics of the local districts. From lowest socioeconomic status to highest, the categories are A, B, CD, DE, FG, GH, I and J.

Public school students in ninth through twelfth grades attend Salem High School in Salem City, together with students from Elsinboro Township, Lower Alloways Creek Township and Mannington Township, as part of a sending/receiving relationship with the Salem City School District. As of the 2023–24 school year, the high school had an enrollment of 387 students and 40.0 classroom teachers (on an FTE basis), for a student–teacher ratio of 9.7:1.

== Schools ==
Schools in the district (with 2023–24 enrollment data from the National Center for Education Statistics) are:

Elementary school

- Quinton Township Elementary School, with 265 students in grades PreK–8

== Administration ==
Core members of the district's administration are:

- Gwen Herman, Superintendent
- Karen Klaus, Business Administrator and Board Secretary

== Board of education ==
The district's board of education, comprised of nine members, sets policy and oversees the fiscal and educational operation of the district through its administration. As a Type II school district, the board's trustees are elected directly by voters to serve three-year terms of office on a staggered basis, with three seats up for election each year held (since 2012) as part of the November general election. The board appoints a superintendent to oversee the district's day-to-day operations and a business administrator to supervise the business functions of the district.
