= Lower Alloways Creek Township School District =

School district in Salem County, New Jersey, US

Address
- 967 Main Street Lower Alloways Creek Township, Salem County, New Jersey, 08079; United States
- Coordinates: 39.465451°N 75.409866°W

District information
- Grades: Pre-K to 8
- Superintendent: Henry Bermann (interim)
- Business administrator: Kimberly Lenox
- Schools: 1

Students and staff
- Enrollment: 176 (as of 2022–23)
- Faculty: 21.0 FTEs
- Student–teacher ratio: 8.4:1

Other information
- District Factor Group: CD
- Website: www.lacschool.org
Ind.	Per pupil	District spending	Rank (*)	K-8 average	%± vs. average
1A	Total Spending	$22,616	56	$18,891	19.7%
1	Budgetary Cost	16,700	48	14,159	17.9%
2	Classroom Instruction	10,481	53	8,659	21.0%
6	Support Services	1,770	16	2,167	−18.3%
8	Administrative Cost	1,824	53	1,547	17.9%
10	Operations & Maintenance	2,176	50	1,612	35.0%
13	Extracurricular Activities	7	5	104	−93.3%
16	Median Teacher Salary	62,300	58	61,136
Data from NJDoE 2014 Taxpayers' Guide to Education Spending. *Of K-8 districts with up to 400 students. Lowest spending=1; Highest=71

The Lower Alloways Creek Township School District is a community public school district that serves students in pre-kindergarten through eighth grade from Lower Alloways Creek Township, in Salem County, in the U.S. state of New Jersey.

As of the 2022–23 school year, the district, comprised of one school, had an enrollment of 176 students and 21.0 classroom teachers (on an FTE basis), for a student–teacher ratio of 8.4:1. In the 2016–17 school year, Lower Alloways Creek Township had the 32nd smallest enrollment of any school district in the state, with 159 students.

The district is classified by the New Jersey Department of Education as being in District Factor Group "CD", the sixth-highest of eight groupings. District Factor Groups organize districts statewide to allow comparison by common socioeconomic characteristics of the local districts. From lowest socioeconomic status to highest, the categories are A, B, CD, DE, FG, GH, I and J.

Public school students in ninth through twelfth grades attend Salem High School in Salem City, together with students from Elsinboro Township, Mannington Township and Quinton Township, as part of a sending/receiving relationship with the Salem City School District. As of the 2021–22 school year, the high school had an enrollment of 399 students and 39.0 classroom teachers (on an FTE basis), for a student–teacher ratio of 10.2:1.

== School ==
Lower Alloways Creek Elementary School had an enrollment of 144 students in grades PreK-8 during the 2021–22 school year.

== Administration ==
Core members of the district's administration are:

- Henry Bermann, interim chief school administrator
- Kimberly Lenox, business administrator and board secretary

== Board of education ==
The district's board of education, comprised of seven members, sets policy and oversees the fiscal and educational operation of the district through its administration. As a Type II school district, the board's trustees are elected directly by voters to serve three-year terms of office on a staggered basis, with either two three seats up for election each year held (since 2012) as part of the November general election. The board appoints a superintendent to oversee the district's day-to-day operations and a business administrator to supervise the business functions of the district.
