= Oldmans Township School District =

School district in Salem County, New Jersey, US

Address
- 10 Freed Road Pedricktown, Salem County, New Jersey, 08067; United States
- Coordinates: 39.751439°N 75.406789°W

District information
- Grades: K-8
- Superintendent: Alicia Smith
- Business administrator: Pamela Zook
- Schools: 1

Students and staff
- Enrollment: 283 (as of 2022–23)
- Faculty: 23.8 FTEs
- Student–teacher ratio: 11.9:1

Other information
- District Factor Group: A
- Website: District website
Ind.	Per pupil	District spending	Rank (*)	K-8 average	%± vs. average
1A	Total Spending	$18,766	39	$18,891	−0.7%
1	Budgetary Cost	12,826	14	14,159	−9.4%
2	Classroom Instruction	8,122	20	8,659	−6.2%
6	Support Services	1,475	9	2,167	−31.9%
8	Administrative Cost	1,427	12	1,547	−7.8%
10	Operations & Maintenance	1,728	34	1,612	7.2%
13	Extracurricular Activities	61	20	104	−41.3%
16	Median Teacher Salary	60,057	44	61,136
Data from NJDoE 2014 Taxpayers' Guide to Education Spending. *Of K-8 districts with up to 400 students. Lowest spending=1; Highest=71

The Oldmans Township School District is a community public school district that serves students in kindergarten through eighth grade from Oldmans Township in Salem County, in the U.S. state of New Jersey.

As of the 2022–23 school year, the district, comprised of one school, had an enrollment of 283 students and 23.8 classroom teachers (on an FTE basis), for a student–teacher ratio of 11.9:1.

The district is classified by the New Jersey Department of Education as being in District Factor Group "A", the lowest of eight groupings. District Factor Groups organize districts statewide to allow comparison by common socioeconomic characteristics of the local districts. From lowest socioeconomic status to highest, the categories are A, B, CD, DE, FG, GH, I and J.

A majority of public school students in ninth through twelfth grades from Oldmans Township (more than 70% in 2018) attend Penns Grove High School as part of a sending/receiving relationship with the Penns Grove-Carneys Point Regional School District, with the balance (the remaining 30%) attending Woodstown High School in the Woodstown-Pilesgrove Regional School District, which also serves students from Alloway Township and Upper Pittsgrove Township. Students from Oldmans Township living west of Interstate 295 are sent to Penns Grove, while those east of the highway are sent to Woodstown. As of the 2018–19 school year, Penns Grove High School had an enrollment of 508 students and 50.0 classroom teachers (on an FTE basis), for a student–teacher ratio of 10.2:1, while Woodstown High School had an enrollment of 603 students and 48.6 classroom teachers (on an FTE basis), for a student–teacher ratio of 12.4:1.

In 2016, the district commissioned a study by the Southern Regional Institute and Educational Technology Training Center at Stockton University to consider sending all students in grades 9-12 to Woodstown High School. The study concluded that Woodstown has the capacity to handle all of the students from Oldmans Township, but noted that the withdrawal from Penns Grove would results in a small decrease in the number of white students in that district's high school. In 2018, the Oldmans Township district sought permission from the commissioner of education to send all students to Woodstown, which has been opposed by the Penns Grove district based on the financial impact caused by the loss of tuition.

== School ==
Oldmans Township School had an enrollment of 286 students in grades PreK-8 as of the 2018–19 school year.

- Alicia Smith, principal

== Administration ==
Core members of the district's administration are:

- Alicia Smith, superintendent
- Pamela Zook, business administrator and board secretary

== Board of education ==
The district's board of education, comprised of nine members, sets policy and oversees the fiscal and educational operation of the district through its administration. As a Type II school district, the board's trustees are elected directly by voters to serve three-year terms of office on a staggered basis, with three seats up for election each year held (since 2012) as part of the November general election. The board appoints a superintendent to oversee the district's day-to-day operations and a business administrator to supervise the business functions of the district.
