= Penns Grove High School =

High school in Salem County, New Jersey, US

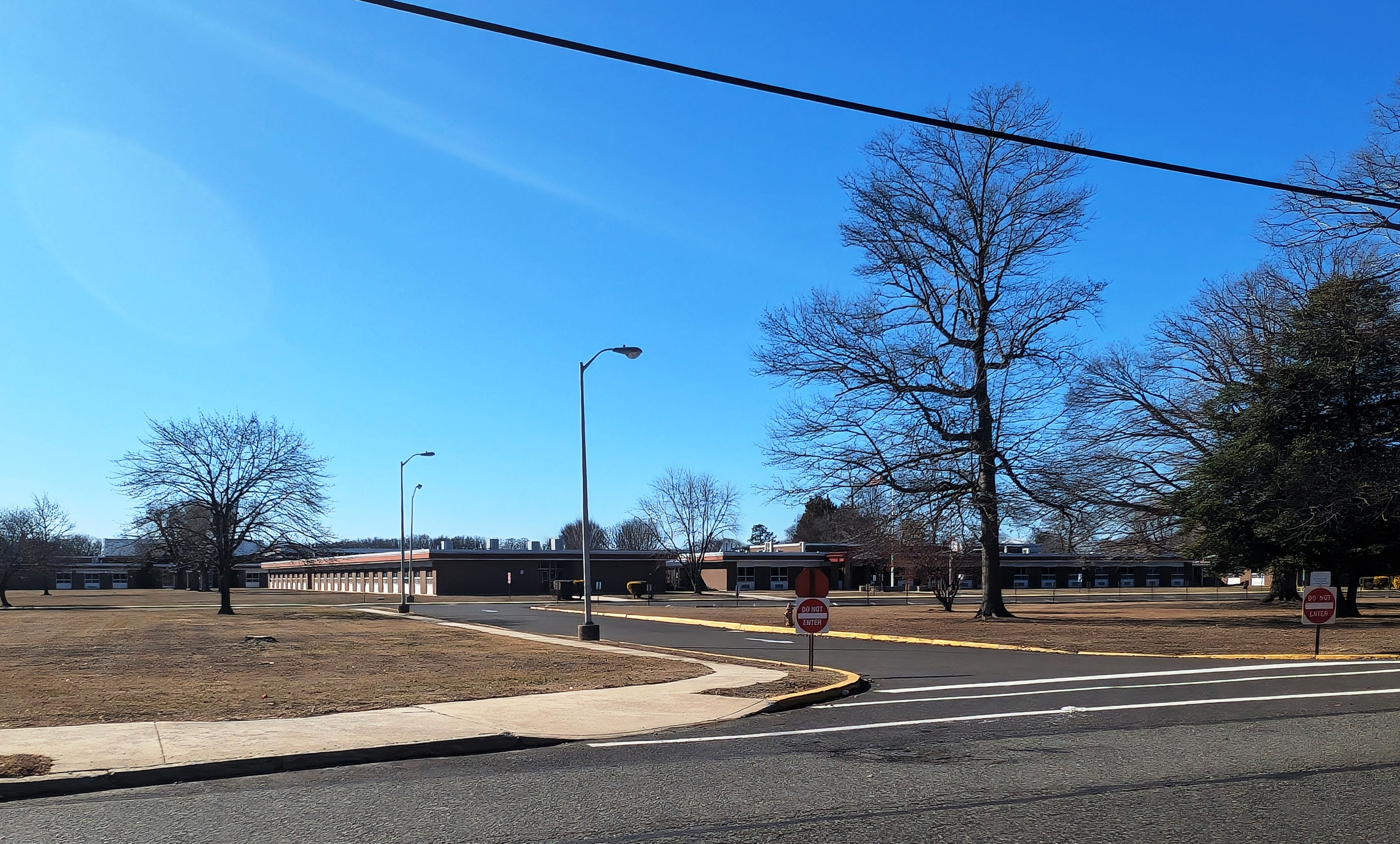

Location
- 334 Harding Highway; Carneys Point Township, Salem County, New Jersey 08069; United States; 39.717679°N 75.455836°W

Information
- Type: Public
- Established: 1908
- School district: Penns Grove-Carneys Point Regional School District
- NCES School ID: 341284005048
- Principal: Lory O'Brien
- Faculty: 42.0 FTEs
- Grades: 9-12
- Enrollment: 621 (as of 2023–24)
- Student to teacher ratio: 14.8:1
- Colors: Red and white
- Athletics conference: Tri-County Conference (general); West Jersey Football League (football)
- Team name: Red Devils
- Rival: Salem High School
- Website: www.pgcpschools.org/o/pghs

Penns Grove High School is a four-year comprehensive public high school that serves students in ninth through twelfth grades from Carneys Point Township and Penns Grove in Salem County, in the U.S. state of New Jersey, operating as part of the Penns Grove-Carneys Point Regional School District. A majority of students in grades 9-12 from Oldmans Township, New Jersey attend the district's high school as part of a sending/receiving relationship with the Oldmans Township School District, with the balance attending Woodstown High School in the Woodstown-Pilesgrove Regional School District. The school is located in Carneys Point Township.

Penns Grove High school hosts the regional Academy of Chemical and Technological Engineering program, which prepares students for college majors in engineering fields. The Academy of Chemical and Technological Engineering operates in partnership with Rowan University, Salem Community College, DuPont and various other contributors.

As of the 2023–24 school year, the school had an enrollment of 621 students and 42.0 classroom teachers (on an FTE basis), for a student–teacher ratio of 14.8:1. There were 394 students (63.4% of enrollment) eligible for free lunch and 56 (9.0% of students) eligible for reduced-cost lunch.

== Awards, recognition and rankings ==
The school was the 256th-ranked public high school in New Jersey out of 339 schools statewide in New Jersey Monthly magazine's September 2014 cover story on the state's "Top Public High Schools", using a new ranking methodology. The school had been ranked 251st in the state of 328 schools in 2012, after being ranked 253rd in 2010 out of 322 schools listed. The magazine ranked the school 266th in 2008 out of 316 schools. The school was ranked 220th in the magazine's September 2006 issue, which surveyed 316 schools across the state.

== Athletics ==
The Penns Grove High School Red Devils compete as one of the member schools in the Tri-County Conference, which is comprised of public and private high schools located in Camden, Cape May, Cumberland, Gloucester and Salem counties. The conference is overseen by the New Jersey State Interscholastic Athletic Association (NJSIAA). With 415 students in grades 10-12, the school was classified by the NJSIAA for the 2022–24 school years as Group I South for most athletic competition purposes. The football team competes in the Diamond Division of the 94-team West Jersey Football League superconference and was classified by the NJSIAA as Group I South for football for 2024–2026, which included schools with 185 to 482 students.

The girls' track team won the indoor track Group II state championship in 1981. The boys team won the Group I title in 1986.

The boys' wrestling team won the South Jersey Group II state championship in 1981.

The boys' track team won the Group II spring / outdoor track state championship in 1984, and won the Group I title in 1986 and 2013-2015. The team won the Group I state indoor relay championship in 1986.

In 1986, the boys' track team set the New Jersey state record for most consecutive dual meet wins with 117. That same year, the track team not only went 10-0 in its dual meets but won every relay meet entered, won the Salem County Meet (10th straight), Tri-County Conference Meet (10th straight), South Jersey Group 1 sectional meet (10th straight) and its second state group title (its first coming in 1984).

The 1988 baseball team won the South Jersey Group I state sectional championship with a 7-5 win against Pitman High School. The team lost by a score of 13-5 to Glen Ridge High School in the Group I championship game. The team had won the Group II state championship in 1958, which was the most recent time that the team had won a sectional title.

The boys' cross country team won the Tri-County Diamond Division Championship in 2006 and 2007, the South Jersey Group I sectional title for outdoor track in 2007 and 2008, and a number of relays won by the Outdoor Track team.

The football team won the South Jersey Group I state sectional championship in 2012, 2018 and 2019.

In 1999, running back James McPherson set the South Jersey single game rushing record. Running back Aaron Hayward posted multiple 1,000 yard seasons and earned a scholarship to Rutgers University. The football team went 9-3 in 2008 reaching the school's first state championship game before falling to rival Glassboro High School. The team was also able to win their first home playoff game in school history in the semifinals. The 2012 Red Devils football team won the South Jersey Group I state sectional championship, the program's first, defeating Woodbury Junior-Senior High School by a score of 30-14 in the title game. The team finished the season with a perfect 12-0 record and set state records by scoring 621 points, breaking a previous record of 599 that had been set by Bergen Catholic High School in 1998, and scoring an average of 51.7 points per game, breaking the record of 51.5 set by Don Bosco Preparatory High School in 2003.

Under Head Football Coach John Emel, Penns Grove became the first football team in South Jersey to finish a perfect 13-0. The team won the South Jersey Group I title in 2018 with a 14-7 win against Salem High School in the playoff finals and went on to finish the season with a 13-0 record and win the South Central Group I title with a 35-26 win against Willingboro High School. The 2019nteam won their second straight section title with a 30-0 win against Paulsboro High School in the South Jersey Group I championship game.

The girls' outdoor track and field team won the Group I state championship in 2013 and 2014.

== Marching band ==
The school's marching band was Tournament of Bands Chapter One Champions in 1973–1975, 1977 and 1979 (Group 1). The marching band was Atlantic Coast Champion in Group 1 (1975, 1977 and 1979) and Atlantic Coast Champion in Group 2 in 1976. The band also won the Cavalcade of Bands Group 1 Open Championship in 2006.

== Administration ==
The school's principal is Lory O'Brien. Her administration team includes two assistant principals.

== Notable alumni ==
- Kenneth A. Black Jr. (1932–2019), politician who served in the New Jersey General Assembly from District 3A from 1968 to 1974
- Don Bragg (1935–2019), Olympic gold medalist in the pole vault at the 1960 Summer Olympics in Rome
- Roy Elsh (1892–1978), professional baseball player
- William J. Hughes (1932–2019), member of the U.S. House of Representatives from 1975 to 1995 who was appointed by President Bill Clinton as United States Ambassador to Panama
- Lavar Scott (born 2003), professional stock car racing driver who competes in the NASCAR O'Reilly Auto Parts Series
- Bruce Willis (born 1955), actor best known for his role of John McClane in the Die Hard series

== Notable faculty ==
- Curly Ogden (1901–1964), former pitcher for the Philadelphia Athletics and Washington Senators who coached at Penns Grove for 18 years.
