= A. B. Brown =

American football player (born 1965)

A.B. Brown
No. 29
- Position: Running back

Personal information
- Born: December 4, 1965 (age 60); Salem, New Jersey, U.S.
- Listed height: 5 ft 9 in (1.75 m)
- Listed weight: 210 lb (95 kg)

Career information
- High school: Salem
- College: Pittsburgh; West Virginia
- NFL draft: 1989: 8th round, 209th overall pick

Career history
- New York Jets (1989–1992)

Awards and highlights
- Second-team All-East (1988)

Career NFL statistics
- Rushing yards: 117
- Rushing average: 2.9
- Receptions: 8
- Receiving yards: 40
- Total touchdowns: 1
- Stats at Pro Football Reference

Anthony James "A.B." Brown (born December 4, 1965) is an American former professional football player who was a running back for the New York Jets in the National Football League (NFL). He played running back for the Salem High School Rams before playing college football for the Pittsburgh Panthers and West Virginia Mountaineers.

== College career ==
Brown, a transfer from Big East rival Pittsburgh, was one of the premiere backs for the Mountaineers during their 1988 run to the National Championship, where they lost to the Notre Dame Fighting Irish. Brown, along with Undra Johnson and Eugene Napoleon, made up the great depth at running back. Brown, whose final game as a Pitt Panther was his 100-yard performance against the Mountaineers, ranks as one of the more memorable backs in West Virginia University. In his senior year, Brown led West Virginia with 913 yards on 167 carries.

After his senior year at West Virginia, Brown entered the 1989 NFL draft. Seen by many NFL teams as a highly coveted running back with great potential, Brown was projected as a late first-round to early second-round pick, but in the days before the draft Brown unexpectedly dropped on the draft boards to the eighth-round for unknown reasons.

== Professional career and life after football ==
Brown was selected by the Jets in the eighth round of the 1989 NFL draft with the 209th overall pick. As a professional in the NFL, A.B. rushed for a career 117 yards with a touchdown in his four-season career with the New York Jets.

== Personal life ==
Brown was born on December 4, 1965, in Salem, New Jersey, to Henry Wright Sr. and Shirley Brown. He also has a brother Steve Brown A.K.A. "Fly D".
