= Woodstown High School =

High school in Salem County, New Jersey, US

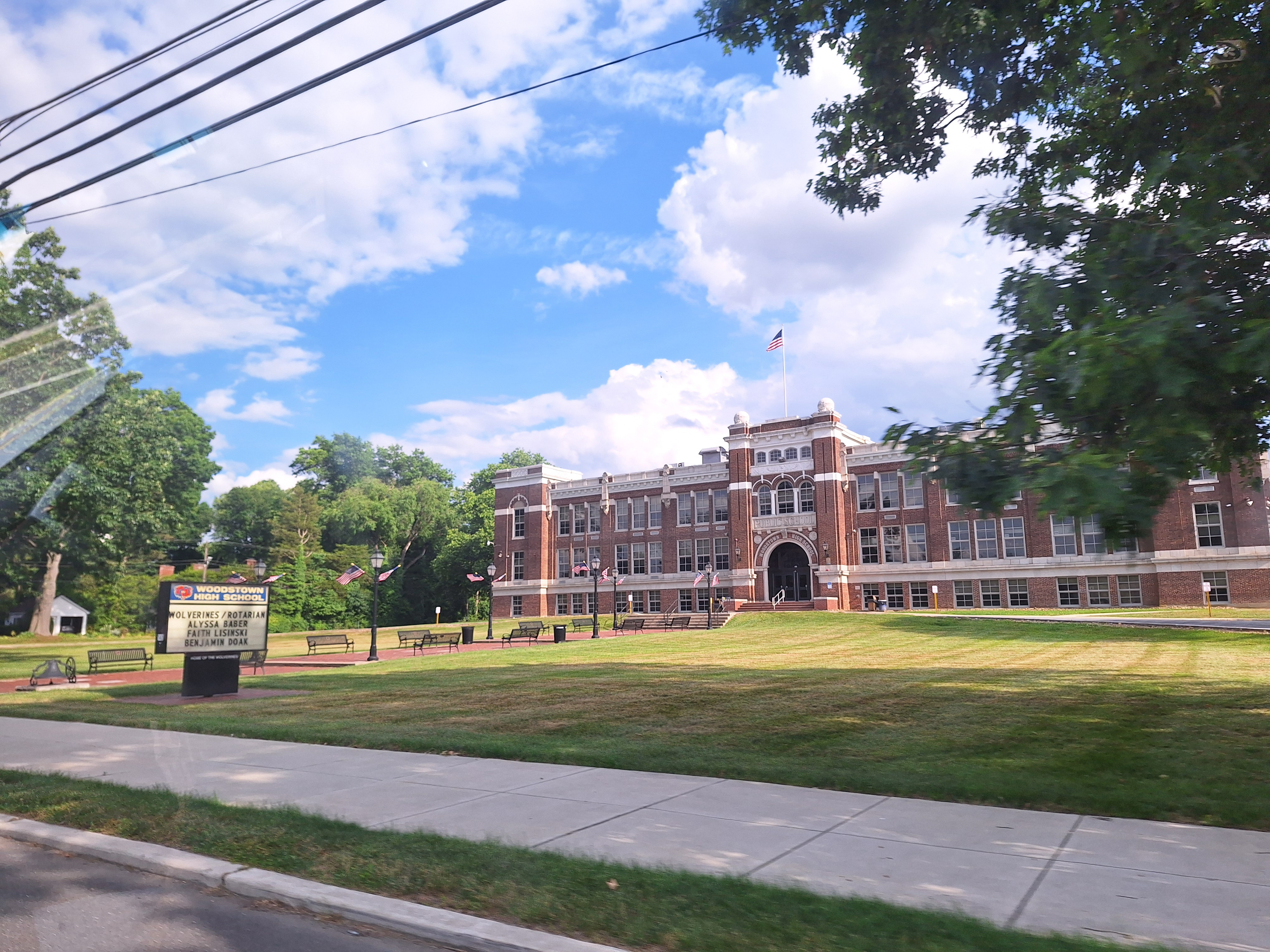

Location
- 140 East Avenue; Woodstown, Salem County, New Jersey 08098; United States; 39.651295°N 75.321618°W

Information
- Type: Public
- School district: Woodstown-Pilesgrove Regional School District
- NCES School ID: 341833005114
- Principal: Richard S. Senor
- Faculty: 50.4 FTEs
- Grades: 9-12
- Enrollment: 550 (as of 2024–25)
- Student to teacher ratio: 10.9:1
- Colors: Royal Blue and Burnt Orange
- Athletics conference: Tri-County Conference (general); West Jersey Football League (football)
- Team name: Wolverines
- Rival: Salem High School
- Yearbook: Woodchips
- Website: whs.woodstown.org

Woodstown High School is a comprehensive community public high school that serves students in ninth through twelfth grade from Woodstown and Pilesgrove Township, in Salem County, in the U.S. state of New Jersey, operating as the lone secondary school of the Woodstown-Pilesgrove Regional School District.

As of the 2024–25 school year, the school had an enrollment of 550 students and 50.4 classroom teachers (on an FTE basis), for a student–teacher ratio of 10.9:1. There were 113 students (20.5% of enrollment) eligible for free lunch and 26 (4.7% of students) eligible for reduced-cost lunch.

Students from neighboring Alloway, Oldmans and Upper Pittsgrove townships attend the high school as part of sending/receiving relationships. A majority of public school students in grades 9-12 from Oldmans Township attend Penns Grove High School as part of a sending/receiving relationship with the Penns Grove-Carneys Point Regional School District, with the balance attending Woodstown High School.

== Awards, recognition and rankings ==
The school was the 137th-ranked public high school in New Jersey out of 339 schools statewide in New Jersey Monthly magazine's September 2014 cover story on the state's "Top Public High Schools", using a new ranking methodology. The school had been ranked 185th in the state of 328 schools in 2012, after being ranked 147th in 2010 out of 322 schools listed. The magazine ranked the school 187th in 2008 out of 316 schools. The school was ranked 171st in the magazine's September 2006 issue, which surveyed 316 schools across the state.

== Athletics ==
The Woodstown High School Wolverines compete as one of the member schools in the Tri-County Conference, which is comprised of public and private high schools in Camden, Cape May, Cumberland, Gloucester and Salem counties. The conference is overseen by the New Jersey State Interscholastic Athletic Association (NJSIAA). With 450 students in grades 10–12, the school was classified by the NJSIAA for the 2019–20 school year as Group I for most athletic competition purposes, which included schools with an enrollment of 75 to 476 students in that grade range. The football team competes in the Diamond Division of the 94-team West Jersey Football League superconference and was classified by the NJSIAA as Group I South for football for 2024–2026, which included schools with 185 to 482 students. The school offers several athletics for both men and women including football, soccer, field hockey, tennis, golf, cross country, basketball, baseball, swimming, lacrosse, wrestling and track and field.

The Thanksgiving Day rivalry with Salem High School, among the state's oldest and one that has attracted crowds exceeding 3,000, was listed at 9th on NJ.com's 2017 list "Ranking the 31 fiercest rivalries in N.J. HS football". Salem leads the rivalry with a 60–35–10 overall record as of 2017.

The field hockey team won the South Jersey Group I state sectional championship in 1978, 2014, 2015, 2018 and 2019.

The baseball team won the Group II state championship in 1991 (vs. Summit High School in the playoff finals) and won the Group I title in 2022 (vs. New Providence High School). The team finished the 1991 season with a 23-7-1 record after winning the Group II state championship by defeating Summit High School by a score of 2–0 in the tournament final. The team won the Group I state championship in 2022, defeating New Providence High School by a score of 6–3 in the title game to finish the season with a 19–9 record.

== Performing arts ==
The music department is a chapter of the Tri-M Music Honor Society. The high school offers concert choir classes to all students, along with select choirs, including an extracurricular Chamber Choir. The school also has a marching band and a concert band along with extracurricular jazz and woodwind ensembles. The department also has a music technology curriculum for students interested in audio production. The Woodstown High School Drama Club features two annual shows, a fall straight play that is student-directed by seniors, who are taught the process of "how" to direct a play by the Drama Club advisor, and a winter musical, which is performed at the end of February/early March. In 2015, the Drama Club performed the Broadway musical, A Tale of Two Cities. The writer of this Broadway show came to see two of the performances, to run a theater workshop with the cast, and also took part in a "Question and Answer" session with the audience.

== Communications Academy ==
Woodstown High School is an academy school in Salem County featuring special services to students interested in the field of communications. The academy programs offer studies in audio and video broadcasting and production along with studies in journalism, public relations, public speaking, and creative writing. The junior class produces the news magazine show "Woodstown In Focus" and senior students in the academy produce the morning news show, Woodstown Today.

== Administration ==
The school's principal is Richard S. Senor. His core administration team includes the vice principal.

== Notable alumni ==
- David Bailey (born 1967), politician who has represented the 3rd legislative district in the New Jersey General Assembly since January 2024
- Mario Cerrito (born 1984), film director
- Jim Cook Jr. (born 1987, class of 2006), writer, actor and musician who won a seat on the Woodstown-Pilesgrove Board of Education only using social media Cook returned to WHS in 2026 as a teacher of English Language Arts.
- Fred Drains (born 1971), American-born and naturalized Swedish basketball player
- Seymour W. Duncan (born 1951), guitarist, guitar repairman and a co-founder of the Seymour Duncan Company, a manufacturer of guitar pickups, bass pickups, and effects pedals
- Evan Edinger (born 1990), American-born YouTuber based in London, England
- Irv Halter (born 1954), retired United States Air Force Major general
- David Mixner (1946–2024), gay rights and civil rights activist, presidential advisor, anti-war advocate and best-selling author
