= Penns Grove-Carneys Point Regional School District =

School district in Salem County, New Jersey, US

Penns Grove-Carneys Point Regional

Address
- 100 Iona Avenue Penns Grove, Salem County, New Jersey, 08069; United States
- Coordinates: 39.721087°N 75.467701°W

District information
- Grades: PreK to 12
- Superintendent: Zenaida Cobián
- Business administrator: Kenneth H. Verrill
- Schools: 5

Students and staff
- Enrollment: 2,185 (as of 2018–19)
- Faculty: 182.0 FTEs
- Student–teacher ratio: 12.0:1

Other information
- District Factor Group: A
- Website: pgcpschools.org
Ind.	Per pupil	District spending	Rank (*)	K-12 average	%± vs. average
1A	Total Spending	$17,477	25	$18,891	−7.5%
1	Budgetary Cost	13,156	22	14,783	−11.0%
2	Classroom Instruction	8,173	36	8,763	−6.7%
6	Support Services	1,638	8	2,392	−31.5%
8	Administrative Cost	1,553	39	1,485	4.6%
10	Operations & Maintenance	1,590	33	1,783	−10.8%
13	Extracurricular Activities	194	1	268	−27.6%
16	Median Teacher Salary	61,110	24	64,043
Data from NJDoE 2014 Taxpayers' Guide to Education Spending. *Of K-12 districts with 1,800-3,500 students. Lowest spending=1; Highest=68

The Penns Grove-Carneys Point Regional School District is a comprehensive regional public school district serving students in pre-kindergarten through twelfth grade from Carneys Point Township and Penns Grove, two communities in Salem County, in the U.S. state of New Jersey. A majority of students in grades 9-12 from Oldmans Township attend the district's high school as part of a sending/receiving relationship with the Oldmans Township School District, with the balance attending Woodstown High School in the Woodstown-Pilesgrove Regional School District.

As of the 2018–19 school year, the district, comprised of five schools, had an enrollment of 2,185 students and 182.0 classroom teachers (on an FTE basis), for a student–teacher ratio of 12.0:1.

The district is classified by the New Jersey Department of Education as being in District Factor Group "A", the lowest of eight groupings. District Factor Groups organize districts statewide to allow comparison by common socioeconomic characteristics of the local districts. From lowest socioeconomic status to highest, the categories are A, B, CD, DE, FG, GH, I and J.

== Schools ==
Schools in the district (with 2018–19 enrollment data from the National Center for Education Statistics) are:

Elementary schools

- Lafayette-Pershing School with 331 students in grades Pre-K to Kindergarten
  - Candy Shockley, interim principal
- Field Street School with 480 students in grades 1 - 3
  - Mary Kwiatkowski, principal
- Paul W. Carleton School with 355 students in grades 4 - 5
  - Cameron Baynes, principal

Middle school

- Penns Grove Middle School with 465 students in grades 6 - 8
  - Tara Allen, principal

High school

- Penns Grove High School with 508 students in grades 9 - 12
  - Lory O'Brien, principal

== Administration ==
Core members of the district's administration are:

- Zenaida Cobián, superintendent
- Christopher DeStratis, school business administrator and board secretary

== Board of education ==
The district's board of education, comprised of nine members, sets policy and oversees the fiscal and educational operation of the district through its administration. As a Type II school district, the board's trustees are elected directly by voters to serve three-year terms of office on a staggered basis, with three seats up for election each year held (since 2012) as part of the November general election. The board appoints a superintendent to oversee the district's day-to-day operations and a business administrator to supervise the business functions of the district.
