= Elsinboro Township, New Jersey =

Township in Salem County, New Jersey, US

- Township
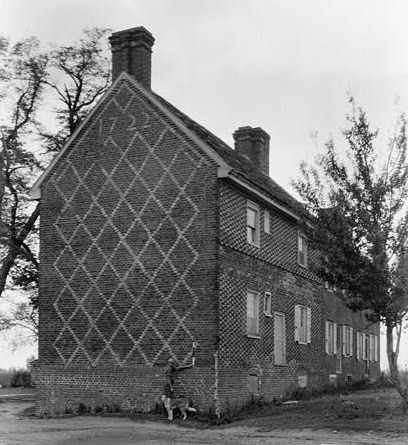
- Nicholson House

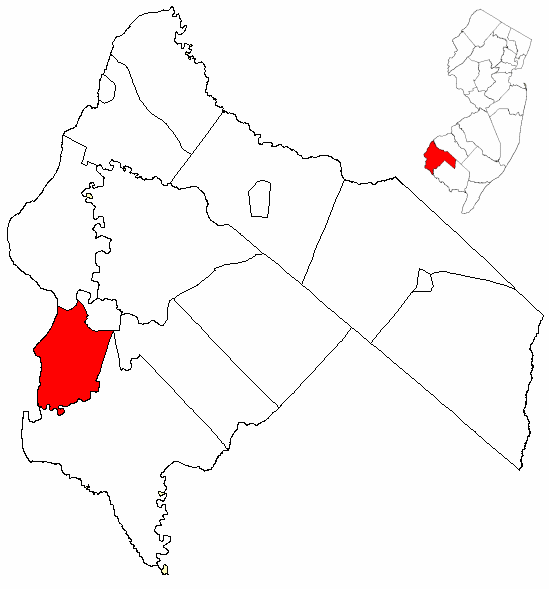
- Elsinboro Township highlighted in Salem County. Inset map: Salem County highlighted in the State of New Jersey.

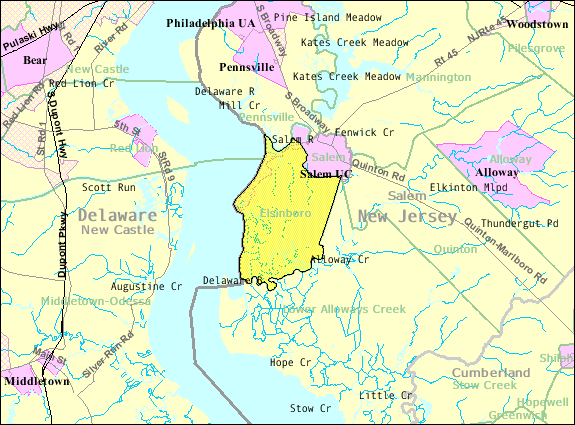
- Census Bureau map of Elsinboro Township, New Jersey

- Location in Salem County Location in New Jersey Location in the United States
- Coordinates: 39.533317°N 75.498478°W
- Country: United States
- State: New Jersey
- County: Salem
- Earliest mention: May 12, 1701
- Incorporated: February 21, 1798
- Named for: Fort Nya Elfsborg

Government
  - Type: Township
  - Body: Township Committee
  - Mayor: Sean M. Elwell (R, term ends December 31, 2023)
  - Municipal clerk: Marty Uzdanovics

Area
  - Total: 13.34 sq mi (34.56 km^{2})
  - Land: 11.93 sq mi (30.90 km^{2})
  - Water: 1.41 sq mi (3.66 km^{2}) 10.58%
  - Rank: 182nd of 565 in state 11th of 15 in county
- Elevation: 10 ft (3.0 m)

Population (2020)
  - Total: 1,001
  - Estimate (2023): 1,006
  - Rank: 532nd of 565 in state 15th of 15 in county
  - Density: 83.9/sq mi (32.4/km^{2})
  - Rank: 546th of 565 in state 13th of 15 in county
- Time zone: UTC−05:00 (Eastern (EST))
  - Summer (DST): UTC−04:00 (Eastern (EDT))
- ZIP Code: 08079 – Salem
- Area code: 856
- FIPS code: 3403321330
- GNIS feature ID: 0882064
- Website: www.elsinborotownship.com

Elsinboro Township is a township in Salem County, in the U.S. state of New Jersey. As of the 2020 United States census, the township's population was 1,001, a decrease of 35 (−3.4%) from the 2010 census count of 1,036, which in turn reflected a decline of 56 (−5.1%) from the 1,092 counted in the 2000 census.

Elsinboro's first mention dates back to May 12, 1701, though it was also mentioned in records on November 28, 1676. The details and date of its original incorporation are unknown. The township was incorporated by an act of the New Jersey Legislature on February 21, 1798, as one of New Jersey's original group of 104 townships.} The township was named for Fort Nya Elfsborg.

== History ==
At the time of European colonization in the 17th century the Delaware River was known as the South River and the Salem River was known as Varkens Kill, or Hogg Creek. In 1641, without having a patent, a group of 60 settlers (20 families) from the New Haven Colony (in today's Connecticut) purchased land along the kill from indigenous Lenape.

Shortly after Johan Björnsson Printz, governor of New Sweden, arrived in the colony in 1643, he instructed that Fort Nya Elfsborg be built. Named after the Old Älvsborg Fortress off shore from Gothenburg, Sweden, it was located on the Delaware River between Salem River and Alloway Creek. In 1655 Peter Stuyvesant, on behalf of the Dutch West India Company, re-asserted control over the region, which was later captured by the British in 1664.

== Geography ==
According to the United States Census Bureau, the township had a total area of 13.34 square miles (34.56 km^{2}), including 11.93 square miles (30.90 km^{2}) of land and 1.41 square miles (3.66 km^{2}) of water (10.58%).

The Salem River flows along a portion of the township's northern boundary, and Alloway Creek flows along its southern boundary. Elsinboro Township contains the site of former Fort Elfsborg. Money Island is located in the southwestern corner of the township.

Elsinboro Township borders Lower Alloways Creek Township, Pennsville Township and Salem. Elsinboro also borders the Delaware Bay.

Unincorporated communities, localities and place names located partially or completely within the township include Elsinboro Neck, Elsinboro Point, Hagerville, Mill Creek Cove, Moores Corner, Oakwood Beach and Sinnickson Landing.

== Demographics ==
Historical population
Census	Pop.	Note	%±
1810	517		—
1820	505		−2.3%
1830	503		−0.4%
1840	526		4.6%
1850	655		24.5%
1860	749		14.4%
1870	700		−6.5%
1880	570		−18.6%
1890	524		−8.1%
1900	445		−15.1%
1910	419		−5.8%
1920	374		−10.7%
1930	405		8.3%
1940	663		63.7%
1950	674		1.7%
1960	1,220		81.0%
1970	1,204		−1.3%
1980	1,290		7.1%
1990	1,170		−9.3%
2000	1,092		−6.7%
2010	1,036		−5.1%
2020	1,001		−3.4%
2023 (est.)	1,006		0.5%
Population sources: 1810–2000; 1810–1920 1840 1850–1870; 1850 1870 1880–1890; 1890–1910 1910–1930; 1940–2000 2000; 2010 2020

=== 2010 census ===
The 2010 United States census counted 1,036 people, 455 households, and 293 families in the township. The population density was 86.9 inhabitants per square mile (33.6/km^{2}). There were 524 housing units at an average density of 44.0 per square mile (17.0/km^{2}). The racial makeup was 93.05% (964) White, 3.47% (36) Black or African American, 0.10% (1) Native American, 0.39% (4) Asian, 0.10% (1) Pacific Islander, 1.06% (11) from other races, and 1.83% (19) from two or more races. Hispanic or Latino of any race were 2.22% (23) of the population.

Of the 455 households, 20.0% had children under the age of 18; 53.8% were married couples living together; 6.2% had a female householder with no husband present and 35.6% were non-families. Of all households, 27.5% were made up of individuals and 13.6% had someone living alone who was 65 years of age or older. The average household size was 2.26 and the average family size was 2.76.

18.0% of the population were under the age of 18, 5.6% from 18 to 24, 22.0% from 25 to 44, 34.1% from 45 to 64, and 20.4% who were 65 years of age or older. The median age was 48.6 years. For every 100 females, the population had 98.1 males. For every 100 females ages 18 and older there were 99.1 males.

The Census Bureau's 2006–2010 American Community Survey showed that (in 2010 inflation-adjusted dollars) median household income was $64,107 (with a margin of error of +/− $9,891) and the median family income was $73,333 (+/− $14,834). Males had a median income of $59,904 (+/− $5,192) versus $42,188 (+/− $14,368) for females. The per capita income for the borough was $31,008 (+/− $2,997). About 1.5% of families and 2.5% of the population were below the poverty line, including 3.9% of those under age 18 and none of those age 65 or over.

=== 2000 census ===
As of the 2000 United States census there were 1,092 people, 468 households, and 324 families residing in the township. The population density was 89.0 inhabitants per square mile (34.4/km^{2}). There were 530 housing units at an average density of 43.2 per square mile (16.7/km^{2}). The racial makeup of the township was 95.05% White, 3.57% African American, 0.18% Native American, 0.27% from other races, and 0.92% from two or more races. Hispanic or Latino of any race were 0.64% of the population.

There were 468 households, out of which 24.6% had children under the age of 18 living with them, 57.7% were married couples living together, 8.1% had a female householder with no husband present, and 30.6% were non-families. 26.3% of all households were made up of individuals, and 13.2% had someone living alone who was 65 years of age or older. The average household size was 2.33 and the average family size was 2.80.

In the township the population was spread out, with 21.2% under the age of 18, 5.0% from 18 to 24, 25.8% from 25 to 44, 28.2% from 45 to 64, and 19.8% who were 65 years of age or older. The median age was 44 years. For every 100 females, there were 90.2 males. For every 100 females age 18 and over, there were 91.8 males.

The median income for a household in the township was $50,972, and the median income for a family was $59,688. Males had a median income of $42,232 versus $30,357 for females. The per capita income for the township was $25,415. About 2.1% of families and 1.7% of the population were below the poverty line, including 0.9% of those under age 18 and 2.3% of those age 65 or over.

== Government ==
=== Local government ===
Elsinboro Township is governed under the Township form of New Jersey municipal government, one of 141 municipalities (of the 564) statewide that use this form, the second-most commonly used form of government in the state. The governing body is comprised of the Township Committee, whose three members are elected directly by the voters at-large in partisan elections to serve three-year terms of office on a staggered basis, with one seat coming up for election each year as part of the November general election in a three-year cycle. At an annual reorganization meeting, the Township Committee selects one of its members to serve as Mayor.

As of 2022, members of the Elsinboro Township Committee are Mayor Sean M. Elwell (R, term on committee ends December 31, 2024; term as mayor ends December 31, 2022), Deputy Mayor Joseph McAllister (R, term on committee ends 2023 and term as deputy mayor ends 2022) and Douglas L. Hogate (D, 2022).

=== Federal, state and county representation ===
Elsinboro Township is located in the 2nd Congressional District and is part of New Jersey's 3rd state legislative district.

For the 119th United States Congress, New Jersey's 2nd congressional district is represented by Jeff Van Drew (R, Dennis Township). New Jersey is represented in the United States Senate by Democrats Cory Booker (Newark, term ends 2027) and Andy Kim (Moorestown, term ends 2031).

For the 2026–2027 session, the 3rd legislative district of the New Jersey Legislature is represented in the State Senate by John Burzichelli (D, Paulsboro) and in the General Assembly by David Bailey (D, Woodstown) and Heather Simmons (D, Glassboro).

Salem County is governed by a five-member Board of County Commissioners who are elected at-large to serve three-year terms of office on a staggered basis, with either one or two seats coming up for election each year. At an annual reorganization meeting held in the beginning of January, the board selects a Director and a Deputy Director from among its members. As of 2025, Salem County's Commissioners (with party, residence, and term-end year listed in parentheses) are:

Director Benjamin H. Laury (R, Elmer, 2027), Deputy Director Cordy Taylor (R, Oldmans Township, 2028), Paul Collier (R, Lower Alloways Creek, 2027), Ed Ramsey (R, Pittsgrove Township, 2026), and Daniel Timmerman (R, Elmer, 2028).

Constitutional officers elected on a countywide basis are: Clerk Dale A. Cross (R, Pennsville Township, 2029), Sheriff Charles M. Miller (R, Salem, 2027) and Surrogate Gordon J. Ostrum Jr. (R, Pilesgrove Township, 2030).

=== Politics ===
As of March 2011, there were a total of 849 registered voters in Elsinboro Township, of which 234 (27.6% vs. 30.6% countywide) were registered as Democrats, 221 (26.0% vs. 21.0%) were registered as Republicans and 392 (46.2% vs. 48.4%) were registered as Unaffiliated. There were 2 voters registered as Libertarians. Among the township's 2010 Census population, 81.9% (vs. 64.6% in Salem County) were registered to vote, including 99.9% of those ages 18 and over (vs. 84.4% countywide).

Gubernatorial election results for Elsinboro Township
Year	Republican		Democratic		Third party(ies)	
Year	No.	%	No.	%	No.	%
2025	327	63.25%	186	35.98%	4	0.77%
2021	334	70.61%	136	28.75%	3	0.63%
2017	257	55.99%	179	39.00%	23	5.01%
2013	356	71.06%	135	26.95%	10	2.00%
2009	266	51.15%	178	34.23%	76	14.62%
2005	278	50.00%	250	44.96%	28	5.04%

In the 2012 presidential election, Republican Mitt Romney received 59.2% of the vote (374 cast), ahead of Democrat Barack Obama with 38.3% (242 votes), and other candidates with 2.5% (16 votes), among the 636 ballots cast by the township's 872 registered voters (4 ballots were spoiled), for a turnout of 72.9%. In the 2008 presidential election, Republican John McCain received 386 votes (58.3% vs. 46.6% countywide), ahead of Democrat Barack Obama with 248 votes (37.5% vs. 50.4%) and other candidates with 16 votes (2.4% vs. 1.6%), among the 662 ballots cast by the township's 870 registered voters, for a turnout of 76.1% (vs. 71.8% in Salem County). In the 2004 presidential election, Republican George W. Bush received 421 votes (61.2% vs. 52.5% countywide), ahead of Democrat John Kerry with 262 votes (38.1% vs. 45.9%) and other candidates with 4 votes (0.6% vs. 1.0%), among the 688 ballots cast by the township's 875 registered voters, for a turnout of 78.6% (vs. 71.0% in the whole county).

United States presidential election results for Elsinboro Township 2024 2020 2016 2012 2008 2004
Year	Republican		Democratic		Third party(ies)	
Year	No.	%	No.	%	No.	%
2024	421	65.47%	211	32.81%	11	1.71%
2020	461	69.85%	194	29.39%	5	0.76%
2016	402	63.41%	199	31.39%	33	5.21%
2012	374	59.18%	242	38.29%	16	2.53%
2008	386	59.38%	248	38.15%	16	2.46%
2004	421	61.28%	262	38.14%	4	0.58%

In the 2013 gubernatorial election, Republican Chris Christie received 71.1% of the vote (356 cast), ahead of Democrat Barbara Buono with 26.9% (135 votes), and other candidates with 2.0% (10 votes), among the 504 ballots cast by the township's 861 registered voters (3 ballots were spoiled), for a turnout of 58.5%. In the 2009 gubernatorial election, Republican Chris Christie received 266 votes (50.9% vs. 46.1% countywide), ahead of Democrat Jon Corzine with 178 votes (34.0% vs. 39.9%), Independent Chris Daggett with 69 votes (13.2% vs. 9.7%) and other candidates with 7 votes (1.3% vs. 2.0%), among the 523 ballots cast by the township's 877 registered voters, yielding a 59.6% turnout (vs. 47.3% in the county).

United States Senate election results for Elsinboro Township1
Year	Republican		Democratic		Third party(ies)	
Year	No.	%	No.	%	No.	%
2024	417	64.95%	213	33.18%	12	1.87%
2018	356	69.40%	134	26.12%	23	4.48%
2012	330	53.83%	263	42.90%	20	3.26%
2006	342	58.16%	230	39.12%	16	2.72%

United States Senate election results for Elsinboro Township2
Year	Republican		Democratic		Third party(ies)	
Year	No.	%	No.	%	No.	%
2020	422	63.55%	223	33.58%	19	2.86%
2014	249	58.31%	162	37.94%	16	3.75%
2013	147	66.22%	73	32.88%	2	0.90%
2008	340	53.88%	265	42.00%	26	4.12%

== Education ==
The Elsinboro Township School District public school students in kindergarten through eighth grade at Elsinboro Township School. As of the 2022–23 school year, the district, comprised of one school, had an enrollment of 119 students and 15.7 classroom teachers (on an FTE basis), for a student–teacher ratio of 7.6:1. In the 2016–17 school year, Elsinboro was tied as the 18th-smallest enrollment of any school district in the state, with 129 students.

Public school students in ninth through twelfth grades attend Salem High School in Salem City, together with students from Lower Alloways Creek Township, Mannington Township and Quinton Township, as part of a sending/receiving relationship with the Salem City School District. As of the 2022–23 school year, the high school had an enrollment of 420 students and 38.0 classroom teachers (on an FTE basis), for a student–teacher ratio of 11.1:1.

== Transportation ==
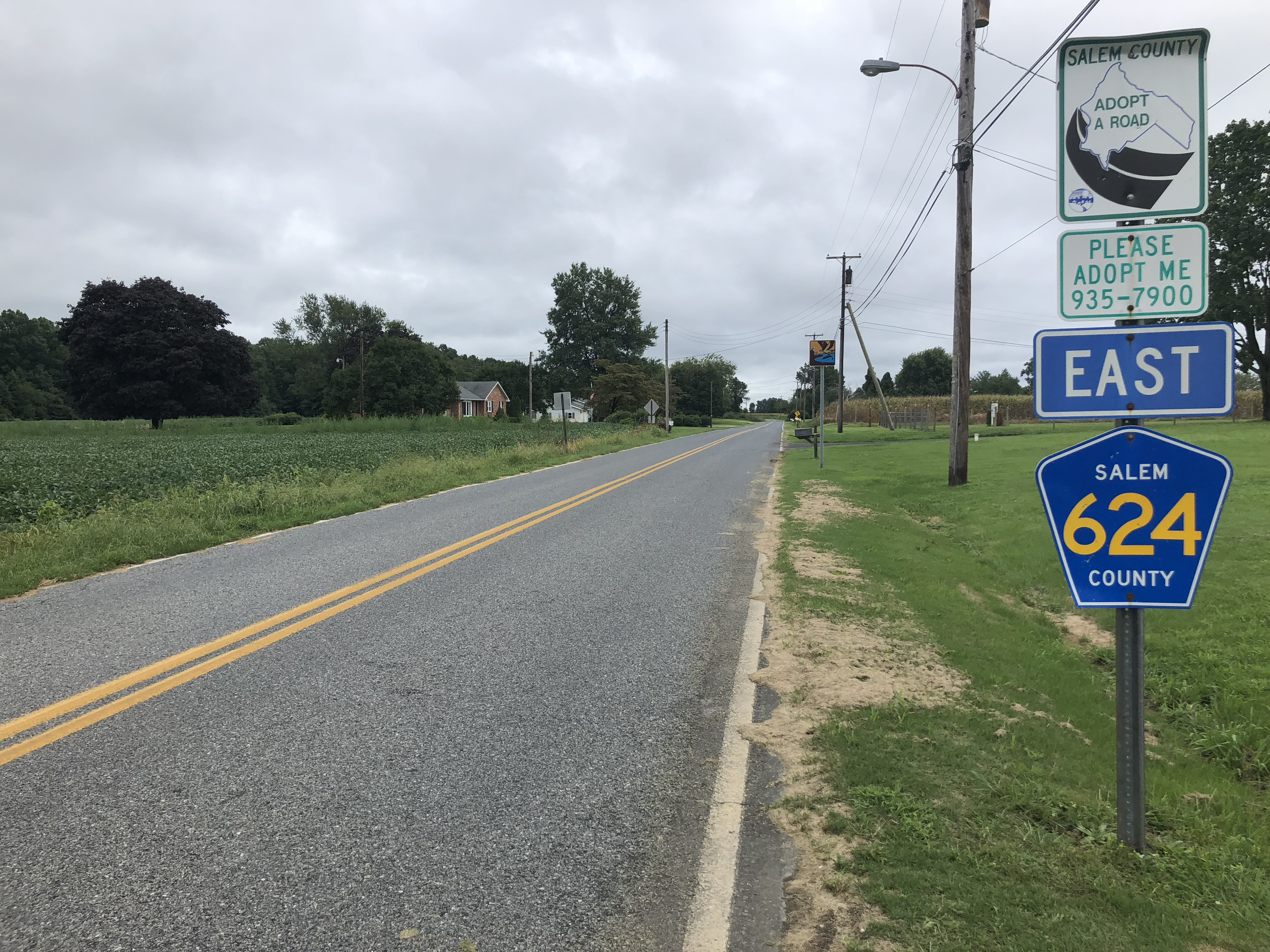
County Route 624 in Elsinboro Township

As of May 2010, the township had a total of 24.13 miles (38.83 km) of roadways, of which 7.67 miles (12.34 km) were maintained by the municipality and 16.46 miles (26.49 km) by Salem County.

No Interstate, U.S., state or major county highways serve Elsinboro Township. The only numbered roads are minor county routes, such as County Route 624.

== Notable people ==
People who were born in, residents of, or otherwise closely associated with Elsinboro Township include:

- George Hires (1835–1911), represented New Jersey's 1st congressional district in the United States House of Representatives from 1885 to 1889
- Pauline Waddington Holme (1848–1940), temperance and suffrage activist
- Esther "Hetty" Saunders (1793–1862), poet of African American descent, born into slavery, who escaped to freedom with her family and lived most of her life in Elsinboro
