= Quinton Township, New Jersey =

Township in Salem County, New Jersey, US

- Township
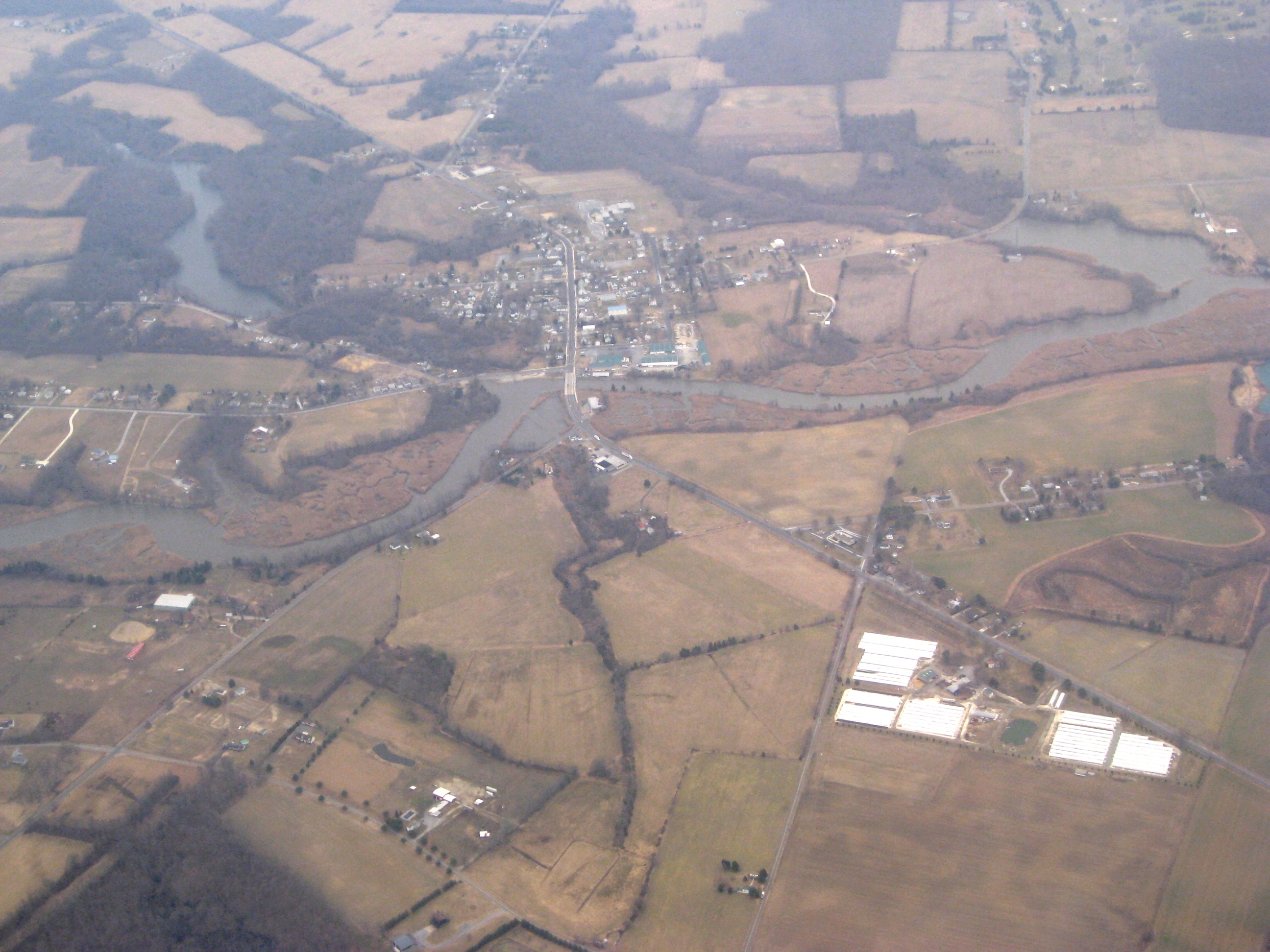
- Aerial photo of Quinton

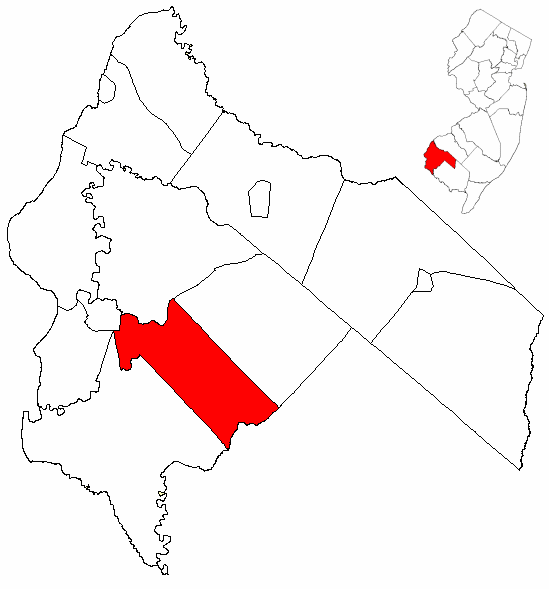
- Quinton Township highlighted in Salem County. Inset map: Salem County highlighted in the State of New Jersey.

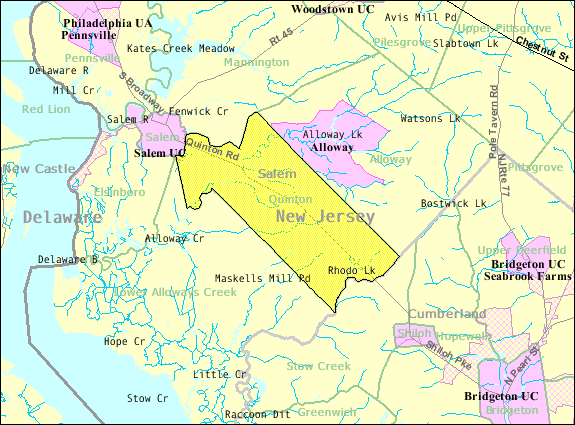
- Census Bureau map of Quinton Township, New Jersey

- Location in Salem County Location in New Jersey Location in the United States
- Coordinates: 39.529355°N 75.392243°W
- Country: United States
- State: New Jersey
- County: Salem
- Incorporated: February 18, 1873

Government
  - Type: Township
  - Body: Township Committee
  - Mayor: Marjorie L. Sperry (R, term ends December 31, 2023)
  - Municipal clerk: Marty R. Uzdanovics

Area
  - Total: 24.27 sq mi (62.87 km^{2})
  - Land: 23.79 sq mi (61.62 km^{2})
  - Water: 0.48 sq mi (1.25 km^{2}) 1.98%
  - Rank: 113th of 565 in state 8th of 15 in county
- Elevation: 69 ft (21 m)

Population (2020)
  - Total: 2,580
  - Estimate (2023): 2,614
  - Rank: 465th of 565 in state 10th of 15 in county
  - Density: 108.4/sq mi (41.9/km^{2})
  - Rank: 536th of 565 in state 9th of 15 in county
- Time zone: UTC−05:00 (Eastern (EST))
  - Summer (DST): UTC−04:00 (Eastern (EDT))
- ZIP Code: 08072
- Area code: 856
- FIPS code: 3403361470
- GNIS feature ID: 0882130
- Website: www.quintonnj.com

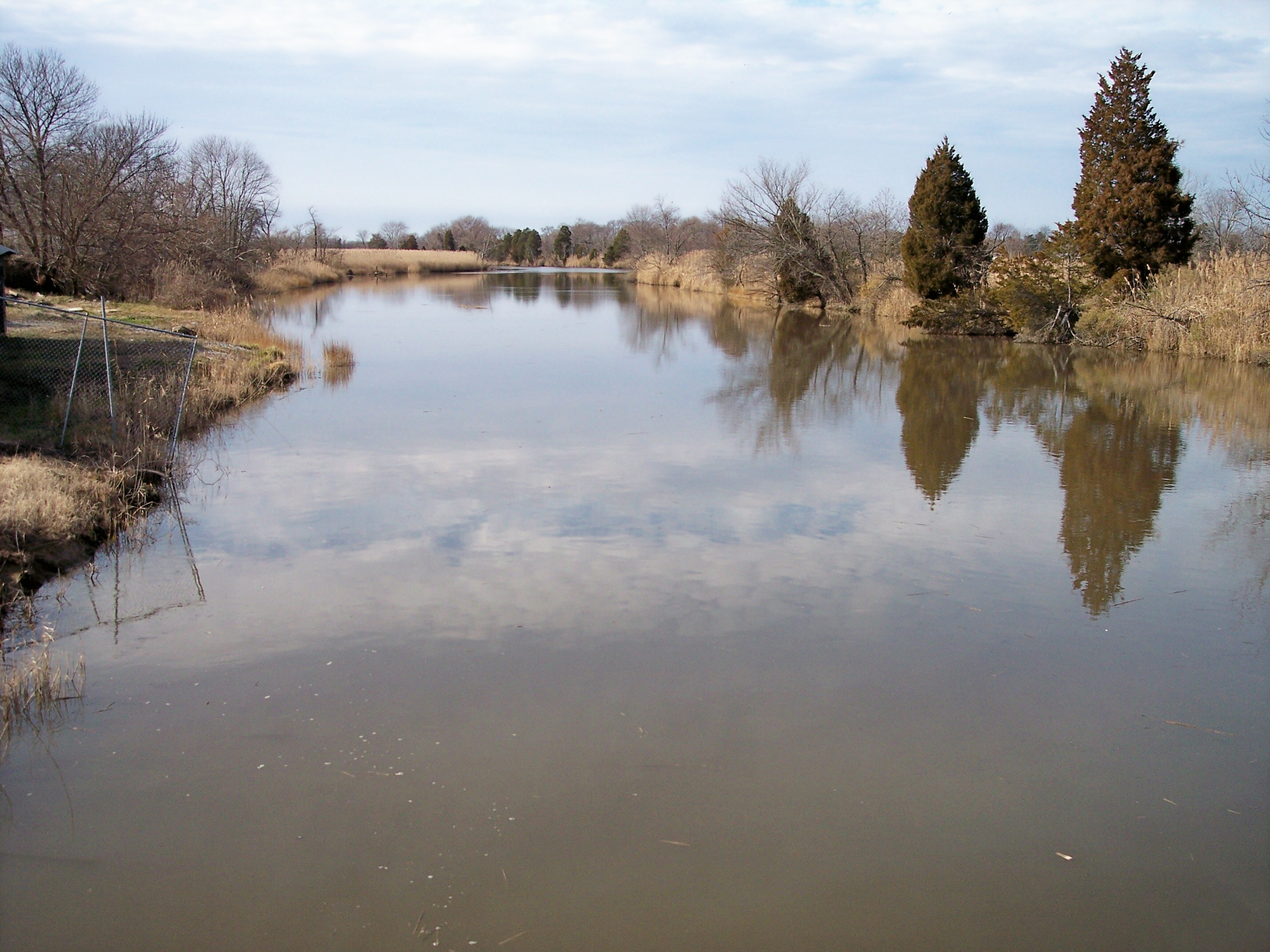
Alloway Creek

Quinton Township is a township in Salem County, in the U.S. state of New Jersey. As of the 2020 United States census, the township's population was 2,580, a decrease of 86 (−3.2%) from the 2010 census count of 2,666, which in turn reflected a decline of 120 (−4.3%) from the 2,786 counted in the 2000 census.

Quinton was formally incorporated as a township by an act of the New Jersey Legislature on February 18, 1873, from portions of Upper Alloways Creek Township (now Alloway Township). The township's name is said to derive from the name of an early settler, with both Tobias Quinton and Edward Quinton mentioned as possible namesakes. In March 1778, during the American Revolutionary War, a minor battle was fought between British forces and local militia at Quinton's Bridge.

It is a dry township, where alcohol cannot legally be sold.

== Geography ==
According to the United States Census Bureau, the township had a total area of 24.27 square miles (62.87 km^{2}), including 23.79 square miles (61.62 km^{2}) of land and 0.48 square miles (1.25 km^{2}) of water (1.98%).

Quinton CDP (with a 2020 Census population of 470) is an unincorporated community and census-designated place (CDP) located within Quinton Township.

Unincorporated communities located partially or completely within the township Berrys Chapel, Harmony, Mickles Mill, Pecks Corner, Woodmere and Woods Upper Mill.

The township borders the municipalities of Alloway Township, Lower Alloways Creek Township, Mannington Township and Salem in Salem County; and Stow Creek Township in Cumberland County.

== History ==
=== April 1963 fire ===
Heavy winds from Delaware Bay through Salem and Cumberland counties set fires in multiple communities on April 4, 1963. One fire was in the bayshore community of Fortescue in Downe Township that destroyed 15 houses, damaged 6 houes and destroyed a restaurant and the local hotel. The second fire began in Quinton around 2:30 p.m., where it started in Smick Lumber Company on Route 49. Embers from the fire reached lumber and escalated, creating heavier fireballs. The 50-mile-per-hour (80 km/h) gusts were fueling the fires along Route 49 as embers and smoked enveloped the area. Fire companies from bigger communities such as Millville, Bridgeton and Vineland were called into Quinton to handle the flames. Local farmers also provided equipment to help fight the fires. With the spontaneous direction changes of flames and embers, it became tough for the firemen to work on centering their efforts on a few buildings and it would not be until after dark before the winds abated enough to help control the fire. 23 people were taken to Salem Memorial Hospital due to eye issues and smoke inhalation.

The post office in Quinton, operated by Mary Myers, was destroyed in the fire. Myers stayed in the post office and did her job until the fire reached the building and she fled with everything that she could grab from the office before it was engulfed. Myers put all the mail, records, cash and stamps in the post office in her bag to get it out. She left the engulfed post office and took the contents of her large bag to the post office in Alloway. The fire ate a local market and Quinton's sewing factory along with numerous houses in the area. Nine families along Route 49 were displaced along with a house on East Fourth Street. The home of the Township Clerk, Kenneth Patrick, was also destroyed in the blaze. Local politicians saved the municipal records going back to 1937 from catching fire at Patrick's house.

19 families totaling 53 people (including 13 children) in Quinton were rendered homeless by the fire in Quinton, but emergency residences were not required as all of the homeless families had relatives in Quinton to assist them. The mayor declared martial law on the evening of April 4 to control the scene of the fire from the numerous onlookers. This was lifted on the morning of April 5. By the morning, authorities had been unable to confirm where at the Smick Lumber Company the fire had started. One worker told the mayor that the building that started the fire had not been wired for electrical service, suggesting wires were not the cause of the fire. Former New York Yankees outfielder Whitey Witt was also an onlooker to the damage in Quinton and Fortescue.

Fire Chief Myron Henderson and Mayor Albert Blades told the press that the damages in Quinton reached about $350,000 (1963 USD). They stated that this would be a major financial strain on the township with the loss of major taxed properties in the fire. Along with the 13 houses leveled by flames, the sewing factory employed 22 people and the only grocery store in the area burned in the blaze. Blades added that the they did not believe that the massive fire would not qualify them for disaster aid from the state or federal governments, but added that the local response was already making up for it. Blades noted that a monetary fund had been started and that new clothing was being brought in for the 53 people who lost everything in the fires. However, onlookers caused issues as nine people were arrested in Quinton fire looting the houses while walking along Route 49. At least one person stole a pocketbook from a burned out home and was surprised by the homeowner, who took a piece of wood and broke the thief's shoulder.

Destruction equipment had been moved into Quinton in the days after the fire. They started leveling the fire ridden homes and businesses with various cranes, dump trucks and bulldozers. By April 11, much of the debris had been eliminated and the sites had been filled in. Over the weekend the officials stated that the women's auxiliaries in the area acquired $5,556 in donations along with furniture and clothes for the families. By Saturday enough donations had been made that newer donations were to be moved to other organizations to use for other people. The Quinton Township Fire Department also operated their own fundraising campaign for the community.

== Demographics ==
Historical population
Census	Pop.	Note	%±
1880	1,390		—
1890	1,307		−6.0%
1900	1,280		−2.1%
1910	1,091		−14.8%
1920	956		−12.4%
1930	1,166		22.0%
1940	1,313		12.6%
1950	1,821		38.7%
1960	2,440		34.0%
1970	2,567		5.2%
1980	2,887		12.5%
1990	2,511		−13.0%
2000	2,786		11.0%
2010	2,666		−4.3%
2020	2,580		−3.2%
2023 (est.)	2,614	▲	1.3%
Population sources: 1880–2000; 1880–1920 1880–1890; 1890–1910 1910–1930; 1940–2000 2000; 2010 2020

=== 2010 census ===
The 2010 United States census counted 2,666 people, 1,036 households, and 756 families in the township. The population density was 110.7 inhabitants per square mile (42.7/km^{2}). There were 1,099 housing units at an average density of 45.6 per square mile (17.6/km^{2}). The racial makeup was 81.58% (2,175) White, 12.90% (344) Black or African American, 0.56% (15) Native American, 0.38% (10) Asian, 0.00% (0) Pacific Islander, 1.20% (32) from other races, and 3.38% (90) from two or more races. Hispanic or Latino of any race were 4.01% (107) of the population.

Of the 1,036 households, 28.8% had children under the age of 18; 53.6% were married couples living together; 14.6% had a female householder with no husband present and 27.0% were non-families. Of all households, 21.1% were made up of individuals and 8.7% had someone living alone who was 65 years of age or older. The average household size was 2.57 and the average family size was 2.98.

23.6% of the population were under the age of 18, 7.0% from 18 to 24, 23.9% from 25 to 44, 29.3% from 45 to 64, and 16.2% who were 65 years of age or older. The median age was 41.5 years. For every 100 females, the population had 95.9 males. For every 100 females ages 18 and older there were 90.7 males.

The Census Bureau's 2006–2010 American Community Survey showed that (in 2010 inflation-adjusted dollars) median household income was $65,061 (with a margin of error of +/− $4,282) and the median family income was $75,833 (+/− $6,396). Males had a median income of $58,542 (+/− $8,331) versus $34,615 (+/− $9,700) for females. The per capita income for the borough was $29,805 (+/− $2,517). About 4.2% of families and 6.0% of the population were below the poverty line, including 10.6% of those under age 18 and 1.7% of those age 65 or over.

=== 2000 census ===
As of the 2000 United States census there were 2,786 people, 1,074 households, and 778 families residing in the township. The population density was 115.3 inhabitants per square mile (44.5/km^{2}). There were 1,133 housing units at an average density of 46.9 per square mile (18.1/km^{2}). The racial makeup of the township was 82.05% White, 14.47% African American, 1.08% Native American, 0.32% Asian, 0.72% from other races, and 1.36% from two or more races. Hispanic or Latino of any race were 1.51% of the population.

There were 1,074 households, out of which 29.3% had children under the age of 18 living with them, 57.9% were married couples living together, 10.1% had a female householder with no husband present, and 27.5% were non-families. 22.7% of all households were made up of individuals, and 10.4% had someone living alone who was 65 years of age or older. The average household size was 2.56 and the average family size was 3.02.

In the township the population was spread out, with 23.6% under the age of 18, 6.8% from 18 to 24, 29.9% from 25 to 44, 23.9% from 45 to 64, and 15.8% who were 65 years of age or older. The median age was 39 years. For every 100 females, there were 99.7 males. For every 100 females age 18 and over, there were 99.3 males.

The median income for a household in the township was $41,193, and the median income for a family was $48,272. Males had a median income of $32,394 versus $22,198 for females. The per capita income for the township was $18,921. About 7.8% of families and 9.3% of the population were below the poverty line, including 10.5% of those under age 18 and 4.4% of those age 65 or over.

== Government ==
=== Local government ===
Quinton Township is governed under the Township form of New Jersey municipal government, one of 141 municipalities (of the 564) statewide that use this form, the second-most commonly used form of government in the state. The governing body is comprised of a three-member Township Committee, whose members are elected directly by the voters at-large in partisan elections to serve three-year terms of office on a staggered basis, with one seat coming up for election each year in a three-year cycle as part of the November general election. At an annual reorganization meeting, the Township Committee selects one of its members to serve as Mayor.

As of 2022, members of the Quinton Township Committee are Mayor Marjorie L. Sperry (R, term on committee ends December 31, 2023; term as mayor ends 2022), Deputy Mayor Joseph J. Hannagan Jr. (R, term on committee ends 2024; term as deputy mayor ends 2022) and Raymond C. Owens (R, 2022).

Joseph Donelson, a former councilmember and mayor, was selected in October 2013 by the Township Council from among three candidates recommended by the municipal Democratic committee to fill the vacant seat expiring in December 2015 of Carl E. Schrier, who had resigned earlier that month. In November 2014, Joseph J. Hannagan Jr., was elected to serve the balance of the term.

=== Federal, state and county representation ===
Quinton Township is located in the 2nd Congressional District and is part of New Jersey's 3rd state legislative district.

For the 119th United States Congress, New Jersey's 2nd congressional district is represented by Jeff Van Drew (R, Dennis Township). New Jersey is represented in the United States Senate by Democrats Cory Booker (Newark, term ends 2027) and Andy Kim (Moorestown, term ends 2031).

For the 2026–2027 session, the 3rd legislative district of the New Jersey Legislature is represented in the State Senate by John Burzichelli (D, Paulsboro) and in the General Assembly by David Bailey (D, Woodstown) and Heather Simmons (D, Glassboro).

Salem County is governed by a five-member Board of County Commissioners who are elected at-large to serve three-year terms of office on a staggered basis, with either one or two seats coming up for election each year. At an annual reorganization meeting held in the beginning of January, the board selects a Director and a Deputy Director from among its members. As of 2025, Salem County's Commissioners (with party, residence, and term-end year listed in parentheses) are:

Director Benjamin H. Laury (R, Elmer, 2027), Deputy Director Cordy Taylor (R, Oldmans Township, 2028), Paul Collier (R, Lower Alloways Creek, 2027), Ed Ramsey (R, Pittsgrove Township, 2026), and Daniel Timmerman (R, Elmer, 2028).

Constitutional officers elected on a countywide basis are: Clerk Dale A. Cross (R, Pennsville Township, 2029), Sheriff Charles M. Miller (R, Salem, 2027) and Surrogate Gordon J. Ostrum Jr. (R, Pilesgrove Township, 2030).

=== Politics ===
As of March 2011, there were a total of 1,701 registered voters in Quinton Township, of which 533 (31.3% vs. 30.6% countywide) were registered as Democrats, 388 (22.8% vs. 21.0%) were registered as Republicans and 778 (45.7% vs. 48.4%) were registered as Unaffiliated. There were two voters registered as either Libertarians or Greens. Among the township's 2010 Census population, 63.8% (vs. 64.6% in Salem County) were registered to vote, including 83.5% of those ages 18 and over (vs. 84.4% countywide).

Gubernatorial election results for Quinton Township
Year	Republican		Democratic		Third party(ies)	
Year	No.	%	No.	%	No.	%
2025	676	65.19%	356	34.33%	5	0.48%
2021	581	69.41%	251	29.99%	5	0.60%
2017	415	58.45%	275	38.73%	20	2.82%
2013	546	71.37%	198	25.88%	21	2.75%
2009	438	48.50%	338	37.43%	127	14.06%
2005	384	48.36%	362	45.59%	48	6.05%

In the 2012 presidential election, Republican Mitt Romney received 55.6% of the vote (673 cast), ahead of Democrat Barack Obama with 43.1% (522 votes), and other candidates with 1.2% (15 votes), among the 1,215 ballots cast by the township's 1,763 registered voters (5 ballots were spoiled), for a turnout of 68.9%. In the 2008 presidential election, Republican John McCain received 679 votes (52.6% vs. 46.6% countywide), ahead of Democrat Barack Obama with 587 votes (45.5% vs. 50.4%) and other candidates with 11 votes (0.9% vs. 1.6%), among the 1,291 ballots cast by the township's 1,710 registered voters, for a turnout of 75.5% (vs. 71.8% in Salem County). In the 2004 presidential election, Republican George W. Bush received 694 votes (57.3% vs. 52.5% countywide), ahead of Democrat John Kerry with 495 votes (40.8% vs. 45.9%) and other candidates with 16 votes (1.3% vs. 1.0%), among the 1,212 ballots cast by the township's 1,662 registered voters, for a turnout of 72.9% (vs. 71.0% in the whole county).

United States presidential election results for Quinton Township 2024 2020 2016 2012 2008 2004
Year	Republican		Democratic		Third party(ies)	
Year	No.	%	No.	%	No.	%
2024	858	67.08%	403	31.51%	18	1.41%
2020	855	60.98%	529	37.73%	18	1.28%
2016	746	61.55%	415	34.24%	51	4.21%
2012	673	55.62%	522	43.14%	15	1.24%
2008	679	53.17%	587	45.97%	11	0.86%
2004	694	57.59%	495	41.08%	16	1.33%

In the 2013 gubernatorial election, Republican Chris Christie received 71.4% of the vote (546 cast), ahead of Democrat Barbara Buono with 25.9% (198 votes), and other candidates with 2.7% (21 votes), among the 774 ballots cast by the township's 1,733 registered voters (9 ballots were spoiled), for a turnout of 44.7%. In the 2009 gubernatorial election, Republican Chris Christie received 438 votes (47.9% vs. 46.1% countywide), ahead of Democrat Jon Corzine with 338 votes (37.0% vs. 39.9%), Independent Chris Daggett with 94 votes (10.3% vs. 9.7%) and other candidates with 33 votes (3.6% vs. 2.0%), among the 914 ballots cast by the township's 1,738 registered voters, yielding a 52.6% turnout (vs. 47.3% in the county).

United States Senate election results for Quinton Township1
Year	Republican		Democratic		Third party(ies)	
Year	No.	%	No.	%	No.	%
2024	797	63.05%	441	34.89%	26	2.06%
2018	614	62.91%	326	33.40%	36	3.69%
2012	569	48.10%	558	47.17%	56	4.73%
2006	436	53.89%	349	43.14%	24	2.97%

United States Senate election results for Quinton Township2
Year	Republican		Democratic		Third party(ies)	
Year	No.	%	No.	%	No.	%
2020	789	56.76%	548	39.42%	53	3.81%
2014	439	56.94%	298	38.65%	34	4.41%
2013	266	62.59%	148	34.82%	11	2.59%
2008	559	44.94%	616	49.52%	69	5.55%

== Education ==
The Quinton Township School District serves public school students in pre-kindergarten through eighth grade at Quinton Township Elementary School. As of the 2023–24 school year, the district, comprised of one school, had an enrollment of 286 students and 30.4 classroom teachers (on an FTE basis), for a student–teacher ratio of 9.4:1.

Public school students in ninth through twelfth grades attend Salem High School in Salem City, together with students from Elsinboro Township, Lower Alloways Creek Township and Mannington Township, as part of a sending/receiving relationship with the Salem City School District. As of the 2023–24 school year, the high school had an enrollment of 387 students and 40.0 classroom teachers (on an FTE basis), for a student–teacher ratio of 9.7:1.

== Transportation ==
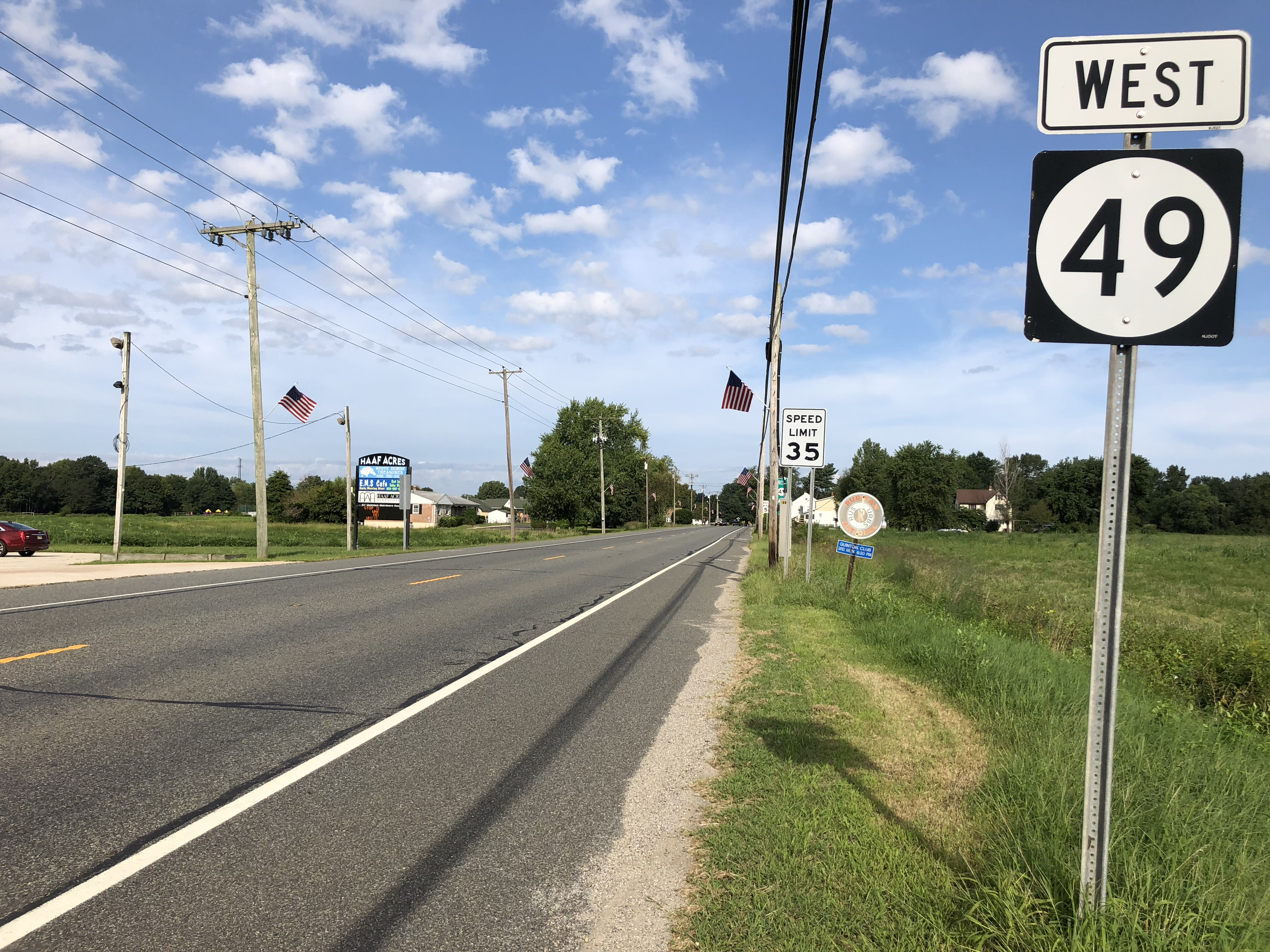
Route 49 westbound in Quinton Township

As of May 2010, the township had a total of 52.58 miles (84.62 km) of roadways, of which 20.24 miles (32.57 km) were maintained by the municipality, 23.67 miles (38.09 km) by Salem County and 8.67 miles (13.95 km) by the New Jersey Department of Transportation.

Roads that pass through the township include Route 49 (Quinton–Marlboro Road, which traverses the township northwest to southeast), County Route 540 and County Route 581 (including its southern terminus at Route 49).

== Notable people ==
People who were born in, residents of, or otherwise closely associated with Quinton Township include:

- George Agnew Chamberlain (1879–1966), novelist and former diplomat
- Shameka Marshall (born 1983), long jumper who won the gold medal at the 2007 NACAC Championships in Athletics
