= Salem High School (New Jersey) =

High school in Salem County, New Jersey, US

Location
- 219 Walnut Street; Salem, Salem County, New Jersey 08079; United States
- 39.5591°N 75.4757°W

Information
- Type: Public high school
- School district: Salem City School District
- NCES School ID: 341455005090
- Principal: Jordan Pla
- Faculty: 35.0 FTEs
- Grades: 9–12
- Enrollment: 393 (as of 2024–25)
- Student to teacher ratio: 11.2:1
- Colors: Royal blue white
- Athletics conference: Tri-County Conference (general); West Jersey Football League (football)
- Team name: Rams
- Rival: Woodstown High School
- Website: www.salemnj.org/o/shs

Salem High School is a comprehensive community four-year public high school that serves students in ninth through twelfth grades from Salem City, in Salem County, in the U.S. state of New Jersey, as part of the Salem City School District. Students from Elsinboro Township, Lower Alloways Creek Township, Mannington Township and Quinton Township attend the school as part of sending/receiving relationships with the respective districts.

As of the 2024–25 school year, the school had an enrollment of 393 students and 35.0 classroom teachers (on an FTE basis), for a student–teacher ratio of 11.2:1. There were 235 students (59.8% of enrollment) eligible for free lunch and 13 (3.3% of students) eligible for reduced-cost lunch.

The district participates in the Interdistrict Public School Choice Program, having been approved on November 2, 1999, as one of the first ten districts statewide to participate in the program. Seats in the program for non-resident students are specified by the district and are allocated by lottery, with tuition paid for participating students by the New Jersey Department of Education.

== Awards, recognition and rankings ==
The school was the 308th-ranked public high school in New Jersey out of 339 schools statewide in New Jersey Monthly magazine's September 2014 cover story on the state's "Top Public High Schools", using a new ranking methodology. The school had been ranked 265th in the state of 328 schools in 2012, after being ranked 277th in 2010 out of 322 schools listed. The magazine ranked the school 284th in 2008 out of 316 schools. The school was ranked 245th in the magazine's September 2006 issue, which surveyed 316 schools across the state.

== Athletics ==
The Salem High School Rams compete as one of the member schools in the Tri-County Conference, which is comprised of public and private high schools in Camden, Cape May, Cumberland, Gloucester and Salem counties. The conference is overseen by the New Jersey State Interscholastic Athletic Association (NJSIAA). With 260 students in grades 10–12, the school was classified by the NJSIAA for the 2019–20 school year as Group I for most athletic competition purposes, which included schools with an enrollment of 75 to 476 students in that grade range. The football team competes in the Diamond Division of the 94-team West Jersey Football League superconference and was classified by the NJSIAA as Group I South for football for 2024–2026, which included schools with 185 to 482 students.

The boys' basketball team won the Group II state championship in 1963 against Mountain High School of West Orange and won the title in 1986 against Central High School of Newark in the tournament final. The 1963 team, led by a tournament-high 38 points from Jerry Dickerson, finished the season with a 26–0 record after winning the Group II title with a 73–61 win against returning champion West Orange Mountain High School in the championship game. The team won back to back Tri-County Conference and South Jersey Group II championships during the 1980–81 and 81–82 seasons. Each season ended in a loss to Clifford Scott High School of East Orange in the state finals. The Salem Rams boys' basketball team won the Tri-County Conference Championship 1951, 1960–1963, 1974–1978, 1981, 1982, 1984-1990 and 2007–2009. Coach George "Lou" Schantz was the first coach in New Jersey high school basketball history to reach the milestone of 600 wins. The 1986 boys' basketball team won the Tri-County Conference Royal Division, South Jersey Group II and New Jersey Group II state championships; Salem defeated Central High School (Newark) in the state finals 77-63 led by the school's all-time leading scorer Keith Jackson. The team won the South Jersey Group I state sectional championship in 2008, defeating Paulsboro High School 64–59 in the final game of the tournament. The team defeated Academy Charter High School 63–48 in the first round of the Group I state tournament, but fell to Science Park High School 77–58 in the finals.

The track & field team, under Coach Nathan Dunn Jr. won the Tri-County Conference Championship in 1960, 1961, 1968 and 1969. Coach Dunn also started the Boys' Cross-Country program at Salem in 1962 and won the Tri-County Conference Championship in 1966 and 1967.

The baseball team, under Coach Wendell Lloyd, won the 1965 Tri-County Conference Championship, then captured the South Jersey Group II championship in 1967. Salem beat Clearview Regional High School and Merchantville High School in the first two rounds of the tournament before defeating Cinnaminson High School in the final game to win the title.

The 1973 football team was awarded the South Jersey Group II state sectional title by the NJSIAA as co-champion with Pleasantville High School. Led by Anthony "A. B." Brown with 2,012 yards rushing, the 1983 football team finished the season with a 9-0-2 record, having won the Tri-County Conference title and the South Jersey Group II sectional title with a 37–13 victory in the championship game against a Hammonton High School team that came into the finals undefeated. The Thanksgiving Day rivalry with Woodstown High School, among the state's oldest and one that has attracted crows exceeding 3,000, was listed at 9th on NJ.com's 2017 list "Ranking the 31 fiercest rivalries in N.J. HS football". Salem leads the rivalry with a 60–35–10 overall record as of 2017.

The spring (outdoor) track and field team won the Group II state championship in 1987 and 1989. The team won the Salem County, Tri-County Conference, South Jersey Group II and the state Group II championships in 1987. Coached by Hall of Famer Lee Bacon, the 1987 team finished the season ranked #1 in South Jersey, earning them the Courier-Post Cup. Team championships also included the Lakewood, Woodbury and Bridgeton Relays. The 1989 boys track and field team won the Salem County, Tri-County championships and won the state Group II title by a single point over Kingsway Regional High School without finishing first in any single event. Bacon previously guided the Rams track team to the 1976 Tri-County Championship.

The girls' basketball team won the 2005 South, Group I state sectional championship, defeating Penns Grove High School 77–54 in the first round and Point Pleasant Beach High School 60–53 in the semifinals, before taking the title with a 57–52 win versus Gloucester City High School. The team also won the 2006 South Jersey Group I state sectional championship.

The softball team earned the South Jersey Group I state title in 2006 with a 5–4 win over Penns Grove High School.

The boys' soccer team earned its first Tri-County Conference Title in team history in 2007 while on its way to its first playoff berth in program history. The team defeated Maple Shade High School 5–0 in the first round of the South Jersey Group I tournament before losing to Arthur P. Schalick High School by a score of 3–1 in the semifinal game. The following year the boys won their second Tri-County conference earning a number one seed in the tournament and fighting their way to a South Jersey Group I title and a berth in the State Group I semi-final match before losing to South River High School.

== Administration ==
The principal is Jordan Pla. The core members of the school's administration include two vice principals.

== Notable alumni ==
- A. B. Brown (born 1965), running back who played in the NFL for the New York Jets
- Spook Jacobs (1925–2011), Major League Baseball infielder
- Lydell Mitchell (born 1949, class of 1968), running back who played in the NFL from 1972 to 1980
- Thomas A. Pankok (1931–2022, class of 1950), politician who served in the New Jersey General Assembly from 1982 to 1986, where he represented the 3rd Legislative District
- Jonathan Taylor (born 1999, class of 2017), running back for the Indianapolis Colts
- Jay Venuto (born 1958), quarterback who played professionally for the Baltimore Colts, New York Jets and Birmingham Stallions
- Rebecca Watson (born 1980), science communicator, podcaster and founder of Skepchick, a blog focused on science and skepticism

== Notable faculty ==
- Sam Venuto (1927–2014), American football running back who played in the NFL for the Washington Redskins and had a record of 132-94-11 as head football coach at Salem HS from 1953 to 1979.
