= Woodstown-Pilesgrove Regional School District =

School district in Salem County, New Jersey, US

Address
- 135 East Avenue Woodstown, Salem County, New Jersey, 08098
- Coordinates: 39.651645°N 75.321863°W

District information
- Grades: PreK-12
- Superintendent: Virginia Grossman
- Business administrator: Rose Chin
- Schools: 4

Students and staff
- Enrollment: 1,425 (as of 2020–21)
- Faculty: 126.5 FTEs
- Student–teacher ratio: 11.3:1

Other information
- District Factor Group: FG
- Website: www.woodstown.org
Ind.	Per pupil	District spending	Rank (*)	K-12 average	%± vs. average
1A	Total Spending	$14,661	1	$18,891	−22.4%
1	Budgetary Cost	13,114	14	14,783	−11.3%
2	Classroom Instruction	7,646	17	8,763	−12.7%
6	Support Services	1,844	14	2,392	−22.9%
8	Administrative Cost	1,734	31	1,485	16.8%
10	Operations & Maintenance	1,497	20	1,783	−16.0%
13	Extracurricular Activities	379	15	268	41.4%
16	Median Teacher Salary	56,626	15	64,043
Data from NJDoE 2014 Taxpayers' Guide to Education Spending. *Of K-12 districts with up to 1,800 students. Lowest spending=1; Highest=49

The Woodstown-Pilesgrove Regional School District is a comprehensive regional public school district serving students in pre-kindergarten through twelfth grade form five communities in Salem County, in the U.S. state of New Jersey. The district serves students from Woodstown and Pilesgrove Township for K-12, along with students from neighboring Alloway Township, Oldmans Township and Upper Pittsgrove Township who attend the district's high school as part of sending/receiving relationships. A majority of public school students in grades 9-12 from Oldmans Township attend Penns Grove High School as part of a sending/receiving relationship with the Penns Grove-Carneys Point Regional School District, with the balance attending Woodstown High School.

As of the 2020–21 school year, the district, comprised of four schools, had an enrollment of 1,425 students and 126.5 classroom teachers (on an FTE basis), for a student–teacher ratio of 11.3:1.

The district is classified by the New Jersey Department of Education as being in District Factor Group "FG", the fourth-highest of eight groupings. District Factor Groups organize districts statewide to allow comparison by common socioeconomic characteristics of the local districts. From lowest socioeconomic status to highest, the categories are A, B, CD, DE, FG, GH, I and J.

== Schools ==
Schools in the district (with 2020–21 enrollment data from the National Center for Education Statistics) are:

Elementary schools

- William Roper Early Childhood Learning Center with 83 students in grades PreK-K
  - Diane Cioffi, principal
- Mary S. Shoemaker Elementary School with 470 students in grades 1-5
  - Diane Cioffi, principal

Middle school

- Woodstown Middle School with 278 students in grades 6-8
  - Allison Pessolano, principal

High school

- Woodstown High School with 579 students in grades 9-12
  - Richard Senor, principal

== Administration ==
Core members of the district's administration are:

- Virginia Grossman, superintendent of schools
- Rose Chin, school business administrator and board secretary

== Board of education ==
The district's board of education, comprised of 11 members, sets policy and oversees the fiscal and educational operation of the district through its administration. As a Type II school district, nine members of the board's trustees are elected directly by voters to serve three-year terms of office on a staggered basis, with three seats up for election each year held (since 2012) as part of the November general election. The board appoints a superintendent to oversee the district's day-to-day operations and a business administrator to supervise the business functions of the district. Seats on the board of education are allocated based on the population of the constituent districts, with five seats assigned to Pilesgrove and for to Woodstown; the sending districts of Alloway Township and Upper Pittsgrove Township each send a member designated by the board of education of the sending district.
