= Salem County, New Jersey =

County in New Jersey, United States

- County
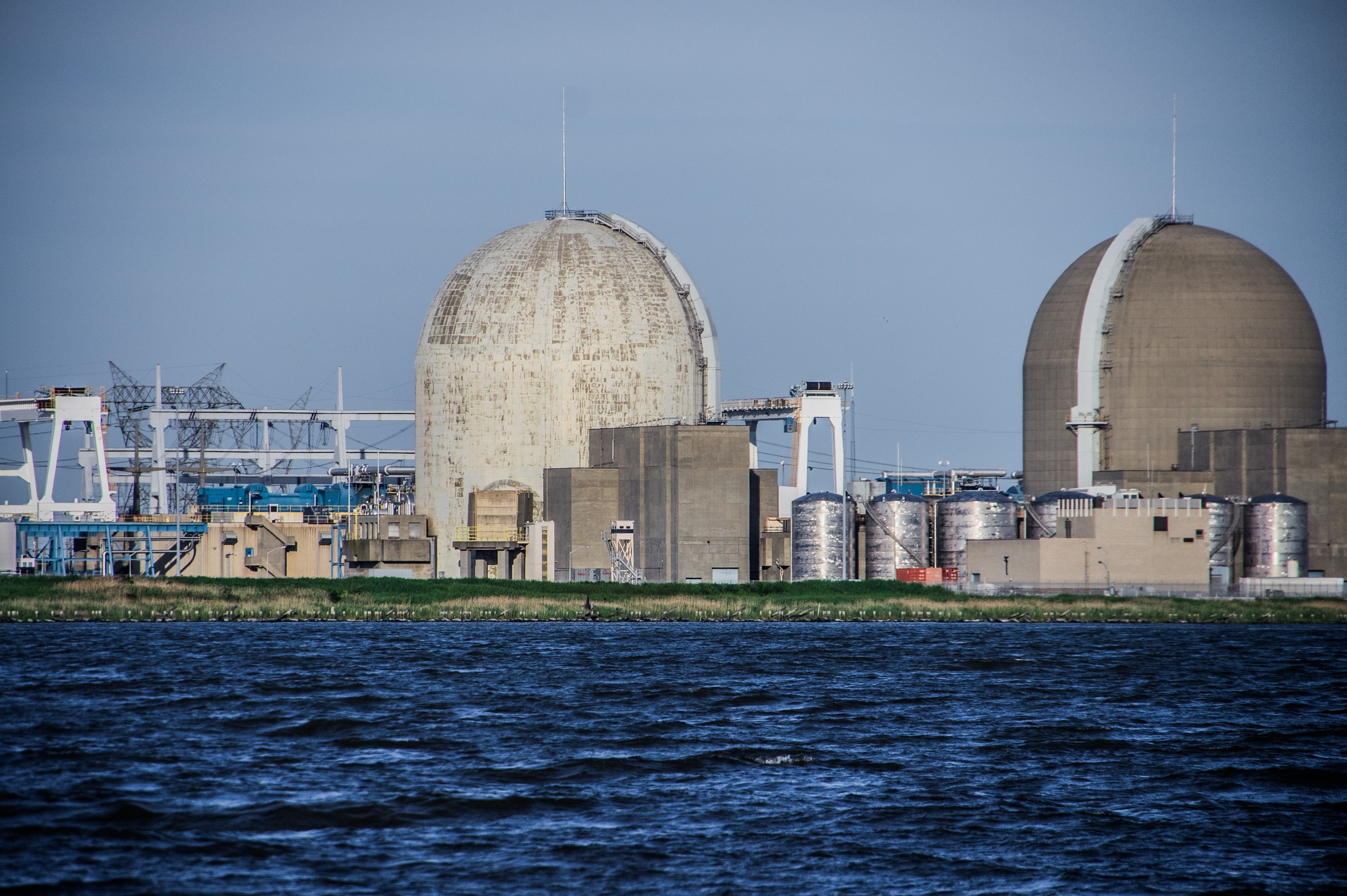
- The Salem Nuclear Power Plant, as seen from Delaware Bay

- Flag Seal Logo

- Location within the U.S. state of New Jersey
- Interactive map of Salem County, New Jersey
- Coordinates: 39°35′N 75°22′W
- Country: United States
- State: New Jersey
- Founded: 1694
- Named for: Hebrew word meaning "peace"
- Seat: Salem
- Largest municipalities: Pennsville Township (population); Lower Alloways Creek Township (area)

Government
  - County Commission Director: Ben H. Laury (R, term ends December 31, 2024)

Area
  - Total: 372.55 sq mi (964.9 km^{2})
  - Land: 331.86 sq mi (859.5 km^{2})
  - Water: 40.69 sq mi (105.4 km^{2}) 10.9%

Population (2020)
  - Total: 64,837 ▼
  - Estimate (2025): 66,280
  - Density: 195.37/sq mi (75.435/km^{2})
- Time zone: UTC−5 (Eastern)
  - Summer (DST): UTC−4 (EDT)
- Congressional district: 2nd
- Website: salemcountynj.gov

Salem County is the westernmost county in the U.S. state of New Jersey. Its western boundary is formed by the Delaware River, and it has the eastern terminus of the Delaware Memorial Bridge, which connects the county with New Castle, Delaware. Its county seat is Salem. The county is part of the South Jersey region of the state.

The county lies within the Philadelphia metropolitan area, also known as the Delaware Valley. As of the 2020 census, the county retained its position as the state's least-populous county, with a population of 64,837, a decrease of 1,246 (−1.9%) from the 2010 census count of 66,083. The United States Census Bureau's Population Estimates Program estimated a 2025 population of 66,280, an increase of 1,443 (+2.2%) from the 2020 decennial census. The most populous place in Salem County is Pennsville Township with 12,684 residents as of the 2020 Census. Lower Alloways Creek Township covers 72.46 square miles (187.7 km^{2}), the largest total area of any municipality.

Salem County, along with adjacent Gloucester County, also in South Jersey, have become an East Coast epicenter for logistics and warehouse construction.

== History ==
=== Etymology ===
The county derives its name from the Hebrew word shalom, which means "peace", chosen by early Quaker settlers to mark the serenity of the area.

=== Early history ===
European settlement began with English colonists in the seventeenth century, who were settling both sides of the Delaware River. They established a colonial court in the area in 1681, but Salem County was first formally organized within West Jersey on May 17, 1694, from the Salem Tenth. Pittsgrove Township was transferred to Cumberland County in April 1867, but was restored to Salem County in February 1868. The area was initially settled by Quakers.

The Old Salem County Courthouse, located on the same block as the Salem County Courthouse, serves as the court for Salem City in the 21st century. It is the oldest active courthouse in New Jersey and is the second oldest courthouse in continuous use in the United States, the oldest being King William County Courthouse in Virginia. The courthouse was built in 1735 during the reign of King George II using locally manufactured bricks. The building was enlarged in 1817 and additionally enlarged and remodeled in 1908. Its distinctive bell tower is essentially unchanged and the original bell sits in the courtroom.

Judge William Hancock of the King's Court presided at the courthouse. He was later killed by the British in the American Revolutionary War during the massacre at Hancock House committed by the British against local militia during the Salem Raid in 1778. Afterward the courthouse was the site of the "treason trials", wherein suspected Loyalists were put on trial for having allegedly aided the British during the Salem Raid. Four men were convicted and sentenced to death for treason; however, they were pardoned by Governor William Livingston and exiled from New Jersey. The courthouse is also the site of the legend of Colonel Robert Gibbon Johnson's proving the edibility of the tomato. Before 1820, Americans often assumed tomatoes were poisonous. In 1820, Colonel Johnson, according to legend, stood upon the courthouse steps and ate tomatoes in front of a large crowd assembled to watch him do so.

Salem County is notable for its distinctive Quaker-inspired architecture and masonry styles of the 18th century. It had a rural and agricultural economy. In the early 20th century, its towns received numerous immigrants from eastern and southern Europe, who markedly added to the population. In the period following World War II, the county's population increased due to suburban development. To accommodate increasing traffic, the Delaware Memorial Bridge was built from Salem County to New Castle, Delaware.

== Geography and climate ==
According to the U.S. Census Bureau, as of the 2020 Census, the county had a total area of 372.55 square miles (964.9 km^{2}), of which 331.86 square miles (859.5 km^{2}) was land (89.1%) and 40.69 square miles (105.4 km^{2}) was water (10.9%). The county is bordered on the west by the Delaware River, and drained by Salem River, Alloway, and other creeks.

The terrain is almost uniformly flat coastal plain, with minimal relief. The highest elevation in the county has never been determined with any specificity, but is likely one of seven low rises in Upper Pittsgrove Township that reach approximately 160 feet (49 m) in elevation. Sea level is the lowest point.

The county has a humid subtropical climate (Cfa) and monthly temperatures in Salem city average from 33.2 °F (0.7 °C) in January to 77.2 °F (25.1 °C) in July, while in Elmer they average from 33.1 °F (0.6 °C) in January to 76.8 °F (24.9 °C) in July.

=== Climate and weather ===
Salem, New Jersey

Climate chart (precipitation, max. and min. temperature)
J	F	M	A	M	J	J	A	S	O	N	D
3 40 25	2.8 44 27	3.9 52 34	3.5 64 43	4 73 53	3.9 82 63	4.6 86 68	3.3 84 66	4.3 77 58	3.4 66 46	3.1 56 37	3.5 45 29
- █ Average max. and min. temperatures in °F
- █ Precipitation totals in inches
- Source: The Weather Channel
Metric conversion
J	F	M	A	M	J	J	A	S	O	N	D
76 4 −4	71 7 −3	100 11 1	89 18 6	100 23 12	99 28 17	116 30 20	83 29 19	110 25 14	87 19 8	79 13 3	88 7 −2
- █ Average max. and min. temperatures in °C
- █ Precipitation totals in mm

In recent years, average temperatures in the county seat of Salem have ranged from a low of 25 °F (−4 °C) in January to a high of 86 °F (30 °C) in July, although a record low of −14 °F (−26 °C) was recorded in January 1985 and a record high of 107 °F (42 °C) was recorded in August 1918. Average monthly precipitation ranged from 2.78 inches (71 mm) in February to 4.57 inches (116 mm) in July.

== Demographics ==
Historical population
Census	Pop.	Note	%±
1790	10,437		—
1800	11,371		8.9%
1810	12,761		12.2%
1820	14,022		9.9%
1830	14,155		0.9%
1840	16,024		13.2%
1850	19,467		21.5%
1860	22,458		15.4%
1870	23,940		6.6%
1880	24,579		2.7%
1890	25,151		2.3%
1900	25,530		1.5%
1910	26,999		5.8%
1920	36,572		35.5%
1930	36,834		0.7%
1940	42,274		14.8%
1950	49,508		17.1%
1960	58,711		18.6%
1970	60,346		2.8%
1980	64,676		7.2%
1990	65,294		1.0%
2000	64,285		−1.5%
2010	66,083		2.8%
2020	64,837		−1.9%
2025 (est.)	66,280		2.2%
Historical sources: 1790–1990; 1970–2010 2010 2020

=== 2020 census ===
As of the 2020 census, the county had a population of 64,837, a median age of 42.1 years, 22.1% of residents under the age of 18, and 19.2% of residents aged 65 or older; for every 100 females there were 95.1 males, and for every 100 females age 18 and over there were 93.2 males age 18 and over.

The racial makeup of the county was 71.9% White, 14.7% Black or African American, 0.5% American Indian and Alaska Native, 1.0% Asian, <0.1% Native Hawaiian and Pacific Islander, 4.6% from some other race, and 7.2% from two or more races; Hispanic or Latino residents of any race comprised 10.1% of the population.

46.8% of residents lived in urban areas, while 53.2% lived in rural areas.

There were 25,225 households in the county, of which 30.2% had children under the age of 18 living in them; 46.2% were married-couple households, 17.9% were households with a male householder and no spouse or partner present, and 28.6% were households with a female householder and no spouse or partner present. About 26.6% of all households were made up of individuals and 12.7% had someone living alone who was 65 years of age or older.

There were 27,763 housing units, of which 9.1% were vacant. Among occupied housing units, 69.6% were owner-occupied and 30.4% were renter-occupied; the homeowner vacancy rate was 2.6% and the rental vacancy rate was 7.7%.

The most reported ancestries in 2020 were:

- Irish (20.6%)
- German (19%)
- English (18%)
- Italian (13.4%)
- African American (10%)
- Puerto Rican (5.1%)
- Polish (3.6%)
- Scottish (2.8%)
- Mexican (2.6%)
- French (2%)

=== Racial and ethnic composition ===
Salem County, New Jersey – Racial and ethnic composition Note: the US Census treats Hispanic/Latino as an ethnic category. This table excludes Latinos from the racial categories and assigns them to a separate category. Hispanics/Latinos may be of any race.
Race / Ethnicity (NH = Non-Hispanic)	Pop 1980	Pop 1990	Pop 2000	Pop 2010	Pop 2020	% 1980	% 1990	% 2000	% 2010	% 2020
White alone (NH)	53,603	53,839	51,171	50,736	45,279	82.88%	82.46%	79.60%	76.78%	69.84%
Black or African American alone (NH)	9,634	9,391	9,257	8,940	9,049	14.90%	14.38%	14.40%	13.53%	13.96%
Native American or Alaska Native alone (NH)	129	206	184	187	182	0.20%	0.32%	0.29%	0.28%	0.28%
Asian alone (NH)	191	363	386	548	649	0.30%	0.56%	0.60%	0.83%	1.00%
Native Hawaiian or Pacific Islander alone (NH)	x	x	10	10	13	x	x	0.02%	0.02%	0.02%
Other race alone (NH)	114	59	58	47	277	0.18%	0.09%	0.09%	0.07%	0.43%
Mixed race or Multiracial (NH)	x	x	721	1,108	2,853	x	x	1.12%	1.68%	4.40%
Hispanic or Latino (any race)	1,005	1,436	2,498	4,507	6,535	1.55%	2.20%	3.89%	6.82%	10.08%
Total	64,676	65,294	64,285	66,083	64,837	100.00%	100.00%	100.00%	100.00%	100.00%

=== 2010 census ===
The 2010 United States census counted 66,083 people, 25,290 households, and 17,551 families in the county. The population density was 199.1 inhabitants per square mile (76.9/km^{2}). There were 27,417 housing units at an average density of 82.6 per square mile (31.9/km^{2}). The racial makeup was 79.83% (52,757) White, 14.09% (9,309) Black or African American, 0.36% (240) Native American, 0.84% (557) Asian, 0.02% (10) Pacific Islander, 2.64% (1,745) from other races, and 2.22% (1,465) from two or more races. Hispanic or Latino of any race were 6.82% (4,507) of the population.

Of the 25,290 households, 29% had children under the age of 18; 49.9% were married couples living together; 14.4% had a female householder with no husband present and 30.6% were non-families. Of all households, 25.4% were made up of individuals and 10.9% had someone living alone who was 65 years of age or older. The average household size was 2.56 and the average family size was 3.07.

23.5% of the population were under the age of 18, 8.2% from 18 to 24, 23.9% from 25 to 44, 29.4% from 45 to 64, and 15% who were 65 years of age or older. The median age was 40.8 years. For every 100 females, the population had 94.9 males. For every 100 females ages 18 and older there were 91.6 males.

== Government ==
=== County government ===
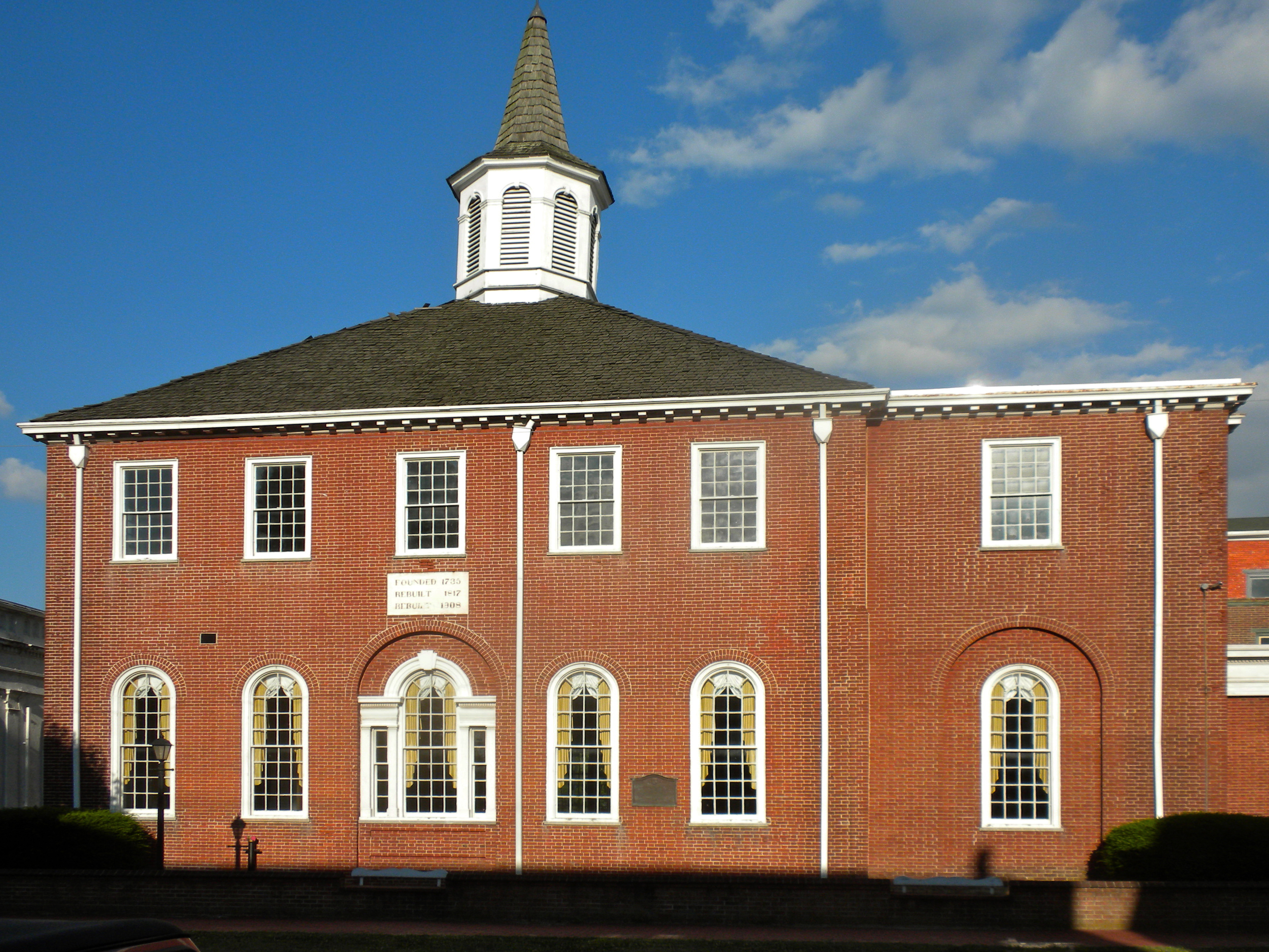
The Old Salem County Courthouse in Salem

Salem County is governed by a five-member Board of Commissioners who are elected at-large to serve three-year terms of office on a staggered basis, with either one or two seats coming up for election each year. At an annual reorganization meeting held at the beginning of January, the board selects a director and a deputy director from among its members. The appointed position professional county administrator was abolished by a unanimous vote of the commissioners in January 2014. In 2016, commissioners were paid $25,410 and the director was paid an annual salary of $26,410.

In the 2016 general election, Salem County voters approved a binding referendum to cut the number of Commissioner from seven to five as well as a non-binding referendum to cut Commissioner salaries by 20%; both initiatives, which had been placed on the ballot as the result of grassroots campaigns opposed to a proposed outsourcing deal, passed by a 3–1 margin. In the wake of the referendum results, Director Julie Acton resigned in December 2016 and was replaced by Scott Griscom. In April 2017, the New Jersey Supreme Court ruled that the reduction in seats will be accomplished through attrition, with the seats expiring at the end of 2017 (held by Commissioners Cross, Painter, and Vanderslice) being eliminated; in the November 2017 general election there was one new three-year seat up for a vote as well as a two-year unexpired term, so that on January 1, 2018, there would be a five-member board. Republicans have held a 5-0 majority on the board since the 2022 election.

As of 2026, Salem County's Commissioners (with terms for director and deputy director ending every December 31) are:

Commissioner	Party, Residence, Term
Director Ben H. Laury	R, Elmer, 2027
Deputy Director Cordy Taylor	R, Oldmans Township, 2028
Ed Ramsay	R, Pittsgrove Township, 2026
Paul Collier	R, Lower Alloways Creek, 2027
Daniel Timmerman	R, Elmer, 2028

Pursuant to Article VII Section II of the New Jersey State Constitution, each county in New Jersey is required to have three elected administrative officials known as "constitutional officers." These officers are the County Clerk and County Surrogate (both elected for five-year terms of office) and the County Sheriff (elected for a three-year term). Salem County's constitutional officers, elected on a countywide basis are:

Title	Representative
County Clerk	Dale A. Cross (R, Pennsville Township, 2029)
Sheriff	Charles "Chuck" Miller (R, Salem, 2027)
Surrogate	Mickey Ostrum Jr. (R, Pilesgrove Township, 2030)

The Salem County Prosecutor is Kristin J. Telsey, who was nominated to fill the position in September 2022. Salem County is a part of Vicinage 15 of the New Jersey Superior Court (along with Cumberland County and Gloucester County), seated in Woodbury in Gloucester County; the Assignment Judge for the vicinage is Benjamin C. Telsey. The Salem County Courthouse is in Salem. No Democrat has won county-wide office since 2020.

=== Federal representatives ===
Salem County falls entirely within the 2nd congressional district For the 119th United States Congress, New Jersey's 2nd congressional district is represented by Jeff Van Drew (R, Dennis Township).

=== State represenatatives ===
All of Salem County is located in the 3rd legislative district.

District	Senator	Assembly	Notes
3rd	John Burzichelli (D)	Heather Simmons (D) Dave Bailey (D)	The remainder of this district includes portions of Cumberland and Gloucester counties.

== Politics ==
United States presidential election results for Salem County, New Jersey
Year	Republican		Democratic		Third party(ies)	
Year	No.	%	No.	%	No.	%
1896	3,717	54.37%	2,802	40.99%	317	4.64%
1900	3,395	50.59%	2,982	44.43%	334	4.98%
1904	3,694	54.69%	2,775	41.08%	286	4.23%
1908	3,713	52.91%	3,174	45.23%	131	1.87%
1912	1,803	29.65%	2,745	45.14%	1,533	25.21%
1916	4,080	53.77%	3,353	44.19%	155	2.04%
1920	7,638	66.50%	3,483	30.33%	364	3.17%
1924	8,027	68.86%	3,206	27.50%	424	3.64%
1928	12,323	80.23%	3,001	19.54%	36	0.23%
1932	9,870	56.64%	7,357	42.22%	198	1.14%
1936	7,671	39.54%	11,614	59.86%	117	0.60%
1940	8,132	39.80%	12,244	59.92%	57	0.28%
1944	7,942	43.38%	10,345	56.50%	23	0.13%
1948	8,961	48.65%	9,278	50.37%	179	0.97%
1952	12,026	51.30%	11,362	48.47%	54	0.23%
1956	14,091	60.16%	9,276	39.60%	56	0.24%
1960	14,192	53.34%	12,394	46.58%	21	0.08%
1964	8,682	32.71%	17,846	67.23%	17	0.06%
1968	11,407	43.45%	11,172	42.56%	3,672	13.99%
1972	16,371	64.84%	8,609	34.10%	269	1.07%
1976	11,639	46.60%	12,826	51.35%	512	2.05%
1980	13,000	51.03%	10,209	40.08%	2,265	8.89%
1984	17,368	65.66%	8,935	33.78%	149	0.56%
1988	15,240	59.52%	9,956	38.88%	410	1.60%
1992	10,363	37.10%	10,062	36.02%	7,510	26.88%
1996	9,294	35.76%	12,044	46.34%	4,654	17.91%
2000	12,257	45.44%	13,718	50.86%	997	3.70%
2004	15,721	52.79%	13,749	46.17%	311	1.04%
2008	14,816	46.99%	16,044	50.88%	672	2.13%
2012	14,334	48.39%	14,719	49.69%	570	1.92%
2016	16,381	54.87%	11,904	39.88%	1,568	5.25%
2020	18,827	55.50%	14,479	42.68%	616	1.82%
2024	18,229	58.80%	12,275	39.60%	497	1.60%

Salem County has generally and historically been a bellwether county in the state, having voted for the national winner all but three times (1960, 1992, and 2000) between 1936 and 2012. Since 2012, the county has swung more toward Republicans, following the trend of most rural counties in the United States. Republican Donald Trump won 54.9% of the vote in 2016, the highest vote share for a Republican since George H. W. Bush in 1988. Trump improved to 55.3% of the vote in 2020 and 58.71% in 2024. As of January 2023, there were a total of 48,956 registered voters in Salem County, of whom 14,768 (30.2%) were registered as Democrats, 14,839 (30.3%) were registered as Republicans and 18,525 (37.8%) were registered as unaffiliated. There were 824 voters (1.7%) registered to other parties. Among the county's 2010 Census population, 64.6% were registered to vote, including 84.4% of those ages 18 and over.

Senate Class 1 election results

United States Senate election results for Salem County, New Jersey1
Year	Republican		Democratic		Third party(ies)	
Year	No.	%	No.	%	No.	%
2024	17,338	56.46%	12,561	40.90%	809	2.63%
2018	13,687	57.47%	9,060	38.04%	1,068	4.48%
2012	12,555	43.82%	15,044	52.51%	1,050	3.67%
2006	10,576	49.71%	9,898	46.52%	802	3.77%
2000	13,900	52.32%	11,566	43.54%	1,101	4.14%
1994	9,577	49.47%	8,876	45.85%	906	4.68%
1988	12,562	49.11%	12,485	48.81%	534	2.09%
1982	9,528	47.60%	9,994	49.93%	495	2.47%

Senate Class 2 election results

United States Senate election results for Salem County, New Jersey2
Year	Republican		Democratic		Third party(ies)	
Year	No.	%	No.	%	No.	%
2020	17,910	53.41%	14,515	43.28%	1,111	3.31%
2014	9,304	51.41%	8,060	44.54%	733	4.05%
2013	5,598	54.65%	3,903	38.10%	743	7.25%
2008	12,869	42.26%	16,132	52.97%	1,452	4.77%
2002	9,487	46.79%	10,232	50.47%	556	2.74%
1996	12,102	47.60%	11,736	46.16%	1,585	6.23%
1990	7,999	42.82%	10,086	53.99%	596	3.19%
1984	10,099	38.54%	15,900	60.67%	207	0.79%

=== State elections ===
Governor election results

Gubernatorial election results for Salem County, New Jersey
Year	Republican		Democratic		Third party(ies)	
Year	No.	%	No.	%	No.	%
2025	13,281	57.11%	9,782	42.06%	192	0.83%
2021	12,620	64.09%	6,893	35.01%	178	0.90%
2017	8,629	50.06%	7,814	45.33%	794	4.61%
2013	12,748	66.63%	5,889	30.78%	495	2.59%
2009	9,599	47.18%	8,323	40.91%	2,422	11.91%
2005	9,608	46.48%	10,057	48.65%	1,008	4.88%
2001	8,878	43.83%	10,837	53.50%	540	2.67%
1997	10,686	49.87%	8,790	41.02%	1,950	9.10%
1993	11,171	52.01%	9,162	42.66%	1,146	5.34%
1989	7,938	39.26%	11,644	57.59%	637	3.15%
1985	12,376	64.92%	6,417	33.66%	270	1.42%
1981	9,841	47.59%	10,334	49.98%	503	2.43%
1977	8,359	44.31%	9,961	52.80%	545	2.89%
1973	8,397	43.33%	10,935	56.43%	47	0.24%
1969	13,182	60.91%	8,389	38.76%	72	0.33%
1965	10,054	46.24%	11,629	53.48%	62	0.29%
1961	9,532	43.76%	12,237	56.18%	11	0.05%
1957	7,552	38.64%	11,968	61.24%	23	0.12%
1953	7,694	43.58%	9,919	56.18%	43	0.24%

== Economy ==
The Bureau of Economic Analysis calculated that the county's gross domestic product was $5.2 billion in 2021, which was ranked 18th in the state and was a 3.9% increase from the prior year.

== Education ==
=== School districts ===
School districts include:

K-12

- Penns Grove-Carneys Point Regional School District
- Pennsville School District
- Pittsgrove Township School District
- Salem City School District
- Salem County Special Services School District
- Woodstown-Pilesgrove Regional School District – Regional

Secondary

- Salem County Vocational Technical Schools

Elementary

- Alloway Township School District
- Elsinboro Township School District
- Lower Alloways Creek Township School District
- Mannington Township School District
- Oldmans Township School District
- Quinton Township School District
- Upper Pittsgrove School District

Elmer School District became a non-operating school district in 2010, and disestablished completely in 2017.

== Transportation ==
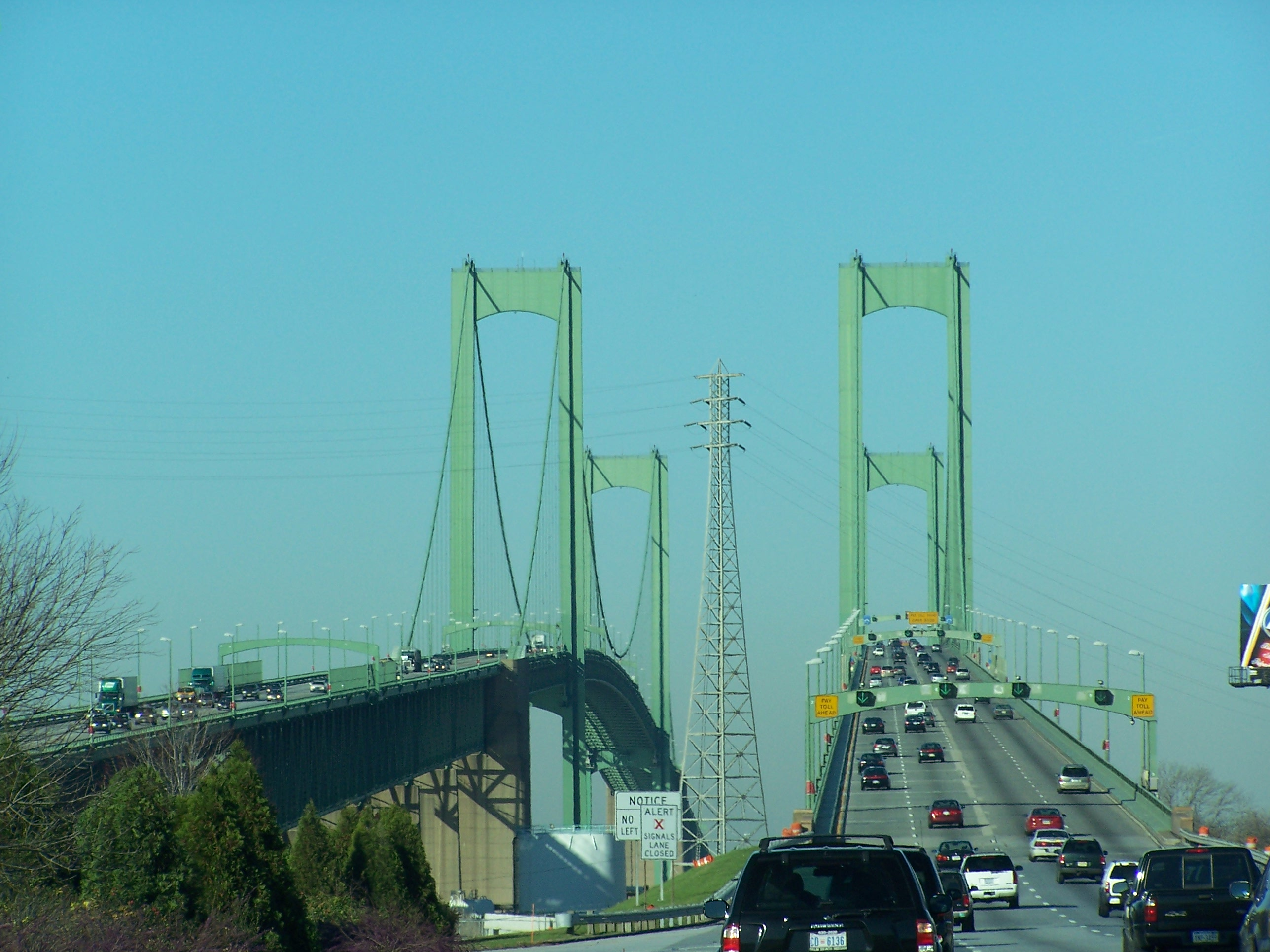
The Delaware Memorial Bridge connects Salem County with New Castle County, Delaware

As of 2010, the county had a total of 879.53 miles (1,415.47 km) of roadways, of which 429.36 miles (690.99 km) were maintained by the local municipality, 355.17 miles (571.59 km) by Salem County and 85.94 miles (138.31 km) by the New Jersey Department of Transportation, 8.11 miles (13.05 km) by the New Jersey Turnpike Authority and 0.95 miles (1.53 km) by the Delaware River and Bay Authority.

Salem is served by many roads. Major county routes include CR 540, CR 551, CR 553 (only in Pittsgrove) and CR 581. State highways include Route 45, Route 48 (only in Carneys Point), Route 49, Route 56 (only in Pittsgrove), Route 77 and Route 140 (only in Carneys Point). The U.S. routes are U.S. Route 40 and the southern end of U.S. Route 130.

Limited access roads include Interstate 295 and the New Jersey Turnpike. Both highways pass through the northern part of the county. Only one turnpike interchange is located in Salem: Exit 1 in Carneys Point (which is also where the turnpike ends). There are a pair of service areas on the Turnpike, both located between exits 1 and 2 in Oldmans Township: The John Fenwick Service Area on the northbound side and the Clara Barton Service Area in the southbound direction. The Route 55 freeway passes through the northeastern part of the county briefly but has no interchanges within the county.

The Delaware Memorial Bridge (which is signed as I-295/US 40) is a set of twin suspension bridges crossing the Delaware River. Connecting New Castle, Delaware and Pennsville Township, the original span was opened in 1951 and the second span in 1968.

NJ Transit operates three routes through Salem County: the 401, which stops in Salem, Woodstown, Swedesboro, and Woodbury en route to and from Philadelphia; the 402, which stops in Penns Grove and has two stops in Salem en route to and from Philadelphia; and the 468, which has local stops throughout Salem County.

== Municipalities ==
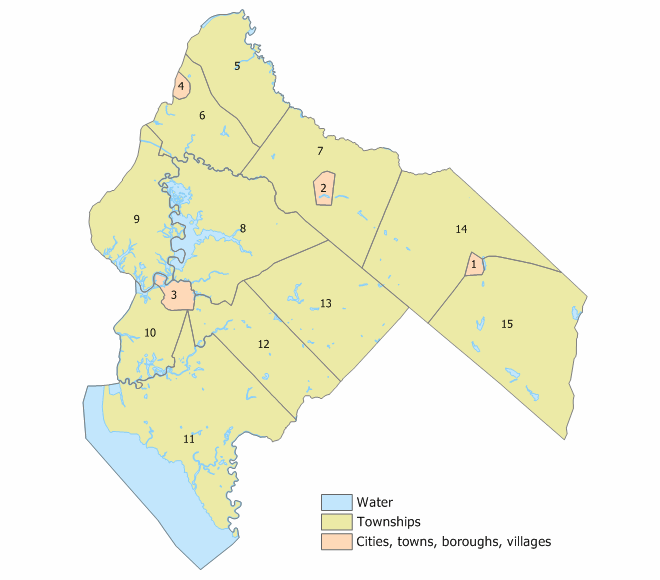
Index map of Salem County municipalities (click to see index key)

Interactive map of municipalities in Salem County.

The 15 municipalities in Salem County (with 2010 Census data for population, housing units and area in square miles) are: Other, unincorporated communities in the county are listed next to their parent municipality. Some of these areas are census-designated places (CDPs) that have been created by the United States Census Bureau for enumeration purposes within a Township. Other communities and enclaves that exist within a municipality are also listed next to the name.

Municipality (map index)	Map key	Municipal type	Population	Housing units	Total area	Water area	Land area	Pop. density	Housing density	School district	Unincorporated communities / notes
Alloway Township	13	township	3,283	1,268	33.83	0.43	33.40	103.8	38.0	Woodstown-Pilesgrove (9-12) (S/R); Alloway Township (PK-8)	Aldine; Alloway CDP (1,296); Friesburg; Penton
Carneys Point	6	township	8,637	3,502	17.74	0.87	16.86	477.3	207.7	Penns Grove-Carneys Point	Carneys Point CDP (8,637)
Elmer	1	borough	1,347	577	0.88	0.01	0.87	1,612.3	666.9	Pittsgrove Township	
Elsinboro	10	township	1,001	524	13.32	1.41	11.92	86.9	44.0	Salem City (9-12) (S/R); Elsinboro Township (K-8)	
Lower Alloways Creek	11	township	1,717	727	72.46	27.23	45.23	39.1	16.1	Salem City (9-12) (S/R); Lower Alloway Creek Township (PK-8)	Hancock's Bridge CDP (155)
Mannington Township	8	township	1,475	592	37.73	4.02	33.70	53.6	17.6	Salem City (9-12) (S/R); Mannington Township (PK-8)	Marshalltown
Oldmans Township	5	township	1,910	699	20.38	0.93	19.45	91.1	35.9	Penns Grove-Carneys Point (9-12) (S/R); Oldmans Township (K-8)	Auburn CDP (part; 1,057); Pedricktown CDP (487)
Penns Grove	4	borough	4,837	2,004	0.91	0.00	0.91	5,656.0	2,202.2	Penns Grove-Carneys Point	
Pennsville Township	9	township	12,684	5,914	24.59	3.31	21.28	630.2	278.0	Pennsville	Deepwater; Pennsville CDP (12,043)
Pilesgrove	7	township	4,183	1,594	35.07	0.23	34.84	115.3	45.7	Woodstown-Pilesgrove	Auburn CDP (part; 1,057)
Pittsgrove	15	township	8,777	3,445	45.92	0.83	45.08	208.3	76.4	Pittsgrove Township	Brotmanville; Centerton; Norma; Olivet CDP (1,297)
Quinton Township	12	township	2,580	1,099	24.58	0.49	24.09	110.7	45.6	Salem City (9-12) (S/R); Quinton Township (PK-8)	Quinton CDP (470)
Salem	3	city	5,296	2,633	2.82	0.47	2.34	2,195.9	1,123.6	Salem City	
Upper Pittsgrove	14	township	3,432	1,310	40.49	0.16	40.33	86.9	32.5	Woodstown-Pilesgrove (9-12) (S/R); Upper Pittsgrove (PK-8)	Daretown; Friendship; Monroeville; Whig Lane
Woodstown	2	borough	3,678	1,529	1.63	0.04	1.58	2,211.8	964.9	Woodstown-Pilesgrove	
Salem		County	64,837	27,417	372.33	40.43	331.90	199.1	82.6		

== Recreation ==
=== Wineries ===
- Auburn Road Vineyards
- Chestnut Run Farm
- Monroeville Vineyard & Winery
- Salem Oak Vineyards

== Notable people ==
- Whitey Witt, former baseball outfielder and member of the New York Yankees' first World Series championship team, 1923
- Teyona Anderson (born 1989), winner of America's Next Top Model (season 12)
- David Bailey, politician who has represented the 3rd legislative district in the New Jersey General Assembly since January 2024
- Isaac Ambrose Barber (1852–1909), U.S. Congressman from Maryland, serving from 1897 to 1899
- Mario Cerrito (born 1984), horror filmmaker
- Isaiah D. Clawson (1820–1879), represented New Jersey's 1st congressional district in the United States House of Representatives from 1855 to 1859
- Fred Drains (born 1971), American-born and naturalized Swedish basketball player
- Rachel Davis DuBois (1892–1993), educator, human rights activist and pioneer of intercultural education
- Hilly Flitcraft (1923–2003), pitcher whose MLB career consisted of three games played with the Philadelphia Phillies during the 1942 season at the age of 19
- Elwood L. Haines (1893–1949), Bishop of the Episcopal Diocese of Iowa from 1944 to 1949
- Irv Halter (born 1954), retired United States Air Force major general who ran for Congress in Colorado in the 2014 elections
- Tara LaRosa (born 1978), mixed martial arts fighter
- Everett Shinn (1876–1953), realist painter best known for his work with the Ashcan School

== See also ==
- National Register of Historic Places listings in Salem County, New Jersey
- Wistarburgh Glass Works – an 18th-century glass company operating in the county.
