= Salem City School District (New Jersey) =

School district in Salem County, New Jersey, US

Address
- 205 Walnut Street Salem, Salem County, New Jersey, 08079; United States
- Coordinates: 39.560156°N 75.472677°W

District information
- Grades: PreK-12
- Superintendent: Carol Kelley
- Business administrator: Herbert Schectman
- Schools: 3
- Affiliation: Former Abbott district

Students and staff
- Enrollment: 1,226 (as of 2021–22)
- Faculty: 99.0 FTEs
- Student–teacher ratio: 12.4:1

Other information
- District Factor Group: A
- Website: www.salemnj.org
Ind.	Per pupil	District spending	Rank (*)	K-12 average	%± vs. average
1A	Total Spending	$23,803	46	$18,891	26.0%
1	Budgetary Cost	18,410	47	14,783	24.5%
2	Classroom Instruction	10,523	46	8,763	20.1%
6	Support Services	3,458	46	2,392	44.6%
8	Administrative Cost	1,749	33	1,485	17.8%
10	Operations & Maintenance	2,250	47	1,783	26.2%
13	Extracurricular Activities	403	19	268	50.4%
16	Median Teacher Salary	57,879	19	64,043
Data from NJDoE 2014 Taxpayers' Guide to Education Spending. *Of K-12 districts with up to 1,800 students. Lowest spending=1; Highest=49

The Salem City School District is a comprehensive community public school district that serves students in pre-kindergarten through twelfth grade from Salem City, in Salem County, in the U.S. state of New Jersey. The district is one of 31 former Abbott districts statewide that were established pursuant to the decision by the New Jersey Supreme Court in Abbott v. Burke which are now referred to as "SDA Districts" based on the requirement for the state to cover all costs for school building and renovation projects in these districts under the supervision of the New Jersey Schools Development Authority.

Public school students from Elsinboro, Lower Alloways Creek Township, Mannington Township and Quinton Township attend the district's high school for grades 9–12 as part of sending/receiving relationships.

The district participates in the Interdistrict Public School Choice Program, having been approved on November 2, 1999, as one of the first ten districts statewide to participate in the program. Seats in the program for non-resident students are specified by the district and are allocated by lottery, with tuition paid for participating students by the New Jersey Department of Education.

As of the 2021–22 school year, the district, comprising three schools, had an enrollment of 1,226 students and 99.0 classroom teachers (on an FTE basis), for a student–teacher ratio of 12.4:1.

The district is classified by the New Jersey Department of Education as being in District Factor Group "A", the lowest of eight groupings. District Factor Groups organize districts statewide to allow comparison by common socioeconomic characteristics of the local districts. From lowest socioeconomic status to highest, the categories are A, B, CD, DE, FG, GH, I and J.

== Schools ==
Schools in the district (with 2021–22 enrollment data from the National Center for Education Statistics) are:

Elementary school

- John Fenwick Academy with 358 students in grades PreK-2
  - Syeda L. Carter, principal

Middle school

- Salem Middle School with 444 students in grades 3–8
  - Pascale E. DeVilmé, principal

High school

- Salem High School with 399 students in grades 9–12
  - John Mulhorn, principal

== Administration ==
Core members of the district's administration are:

- Carol Kelley, superintendent
- Herbert Schectman, business administrator and board secretary

After 15 years as Superintendent, Dr. Amiot Patrick Michel retired in December 2024 and Dr. Carol Kelley, who was previously the Superintendent in Princeton until the fall of 2023 when she resigned after a controversial tenure there, began in Salem City in January 2025.

== Board of education ==
The district's board of education is comprised of nine members who set policy and oversee the fiscal and educational operation of the district through its administration; Each of the sending districts have an appointed member who serves on the board. As a Type II school district, the board's trustees are elected directly by voters to serve three-year terms of office on a staggered basis, with three seats up for election each year held (since 2013) as part of the November general election. The board appoints a superintendent to oversee the district's day-to-day operations and a business administrator to supervise the business functions of the district.
