= Elmer School District =

School district in Salem County, New Jersey, US

Coordinates: 39.59281°N 75.175324°W

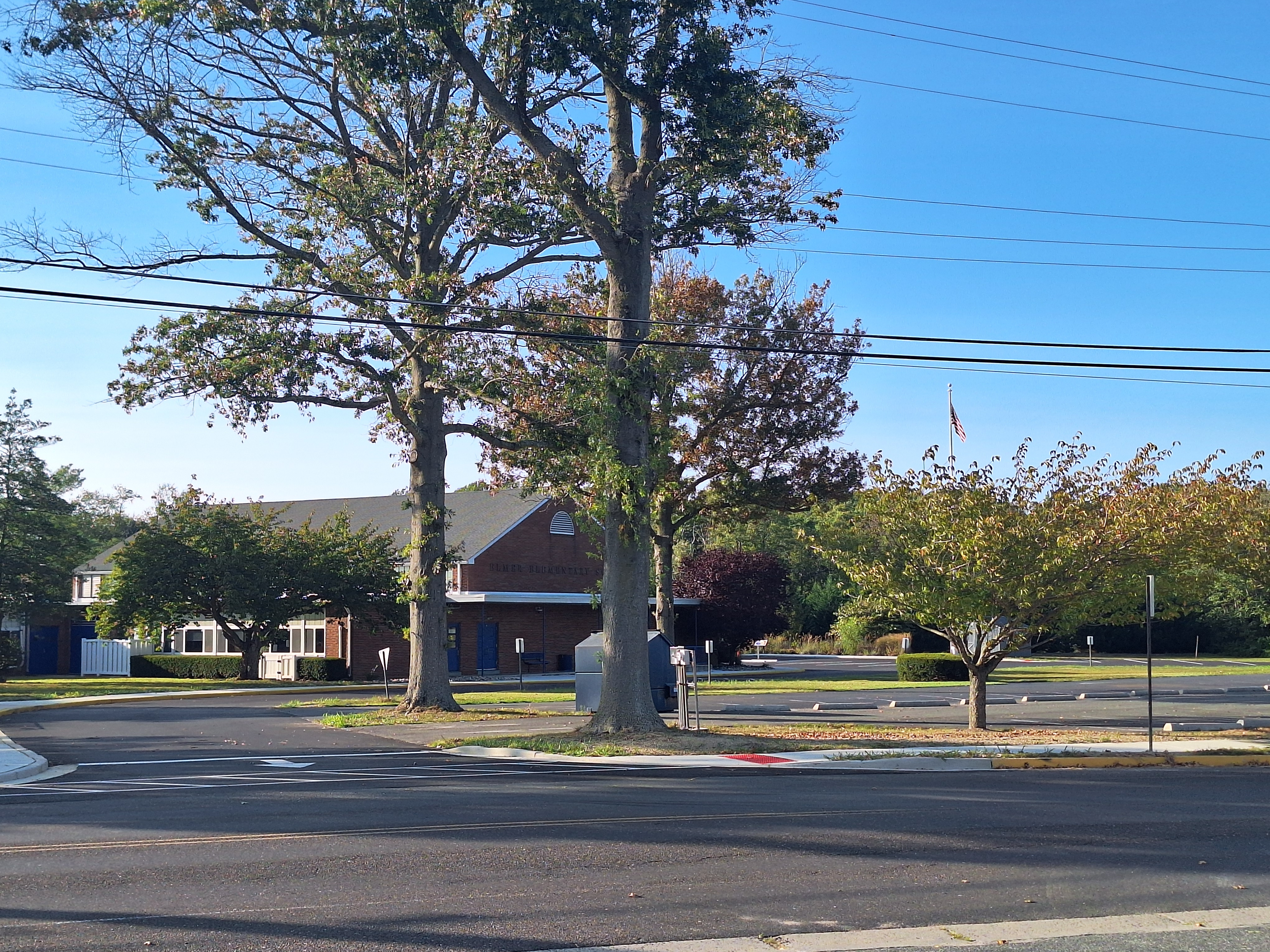
- Front Street; Elmer, NJ 08318

District information
- Grades: K-6 (until circa 2003-2004) K-4 (circa 2003-2004 to 2010) none (non-operating district, 2010-2017)
- Superintendent: Stephen E. Berkowitz
- Business administrator: Henry Bermann
- Schools: 1 (prior to 2010) none (2010-2017)

Students and staff
- Enrollment: 76 (as of 2007-08)
- Faculty: 6.0 FTEs
- Student–teacher ratio: 12.7

Other information
- District Factor Group: CD
- Website: https://www.elmerschool.com
Ind.	Per pupil	District spending	Rank (*)	K-6 average	%± vs. average
1	Budgetary Cost	16,609	53	12,195	36.2%
2	Classroom Instruction	7,212	23	7,366	−2.1%
6	Support Services	3,004	53	1,832	64.0%
8	Administrative Cost	1,646	42	1,389	18.5%
10	Operations & Maintenance	3,548	61	1,472	141.0%
13	Extracurricular Activities	79	36	40	97.5%
16	Median Teacher Salary	41,034	2	52,691
Data from NJDoE 2009 Taxpayers' Guide to Education Spending. *Of K-6 districts with any number of students. Lowest spending=1; Highest=62

The Elmer School District was a community public school district that served students in pre-kindergarten and from the Borough of Elmer in Salem County, in the U.S. state of New Jersey. It operated an elementary school which covered up to grade 4 in the late 2000s. In previous eras, the school went up to grade 6. The district also operated The Learning Center in Elmer School for infants through PreK-4.

For fifth (as of the late 2000s) through twelfth grades, public school students attended Pittsgrove Township Middle School (5-8) and then Arthur P. Schalick High School (9-12), in Pittsgrove Township, as part of a sending/receiving relationship with the Pittsgrove Township School District.

At a meeting conducted in June 2009, the Elmer Board of Education voted to merge its student body with that of the Pittsgrove Township School District and would send all of its students as part of the send-receive relationship. It was fully disestablished in 2017 and merged into the Pittsgrove Township School District.

As of the 2007–08 school year, the district's one school had an enrollment of 76 students and 6.0 classroom teachers (on an FTE basis), for a student–teacher ratio of 12.7.

The district was classified by the New Jersey Department of Education as being in District Factor Group "CD", the sixth-highest of eight groupings. District Factor Groups organize districts statewide to allow comparison by common socioeconomic characteristics of the local districts. From lowest socioeconomic status to highest, the categories are A, B, CD, DE, FG, GH, I and J. Elmer School District is now merged with Pittsgrove Township School District.

== History ==
Circa 2003/2004 the school no longer covered the 5th and 6th grades.

In 2009 the Elmer district reached an agreement on a sending/receiving relationship with the Pittsgrove District. Elmer School District became a non-operating school district (in which it operates no schools and only sends students to other school districts) in 2010.

In 2017 the Elmer School District and its board of education were dissolved, and the Pittsgrove district acquired the Elmer school. The Pittsgrove district paid the Elmer district $620,000 for the Elmer School. The district dissolved after that purchase. The Elmer district had a debt of $2,800,000 to the State of New Jersey, and the state canceled the debt after the merger occurred.

== School ==
Elmer School had 76 students as of the 2007–08 school year.

== Administration ==
Core members of the district's administration are:

- Stephen E. Berkowitz, superintendent and principal
- Henry Bermann, board secretary and school business administrator
