= History of the Jews in New Jersey =

The history of Jews in New Jersey started with the arrival of Dutch and English traders and settlers in the late 1600s. According to the Berman Jewish DataBank's 2019 survey, New Jersey is the state with the fourth-highest total population of Jews at 545,450 and is also the state with the third highest percent of Jews at 6.1%. This means that New Jersey is home to 7.8% of the American Jewish population.

== Colonial era ==
Several references to Jews are present in early colonial New Jersey records: for example, Moses Levy, referred to as a "Jew here", was one of the inhabitants of New Jersey who petitioned King George I to veto an act of the colonial assembly permitting Quakers to affirm. Asher Levy, the grandson of Asser Levy, was the only Jew in New Jersey's troops during the American Revolutionary War: Levy was commissioned as an ensign in the first regiment on September 12, 1778, and resigned on June 4, 1779. Many of the Jews present in the state during the colonial period were merchants from nearby Philadelphia and New York City.

The documentation notes several Sephardic Jewish families of Spanish, Portuguese, or Italian descent (“traders”) arriving in early New Jersey 1679-1792 after being forced to flee less hospitable and tolerant areas such as early Boston, often anglicizing their surnames, and some later converting. These early settlers held clandestine meetings, holidays, worship, and burial arrangements near, and on, what is now Newark’s Prince Street named for one of those original families.

The first organized Jewish community in the state was in Newark, which was established in 1844 by Louis Trier. The Congregation B'nai Jeshurun of Newark, the oldest synagogue in Newark, was created on August 20, 1848, by Jewish immigrants from Germany. Other cities in New Jersey with early Jewish congregations were Paterson (1847), New Brunswick (1861), Jersey City (1864), Bayonne (1878), Elizabeth (1881), Vineland (1882), Passaic (1899), Perth Amboy (1890), Atlantic City (1890), Woodbine (1891), Camden (1894) and Englewood (1896).

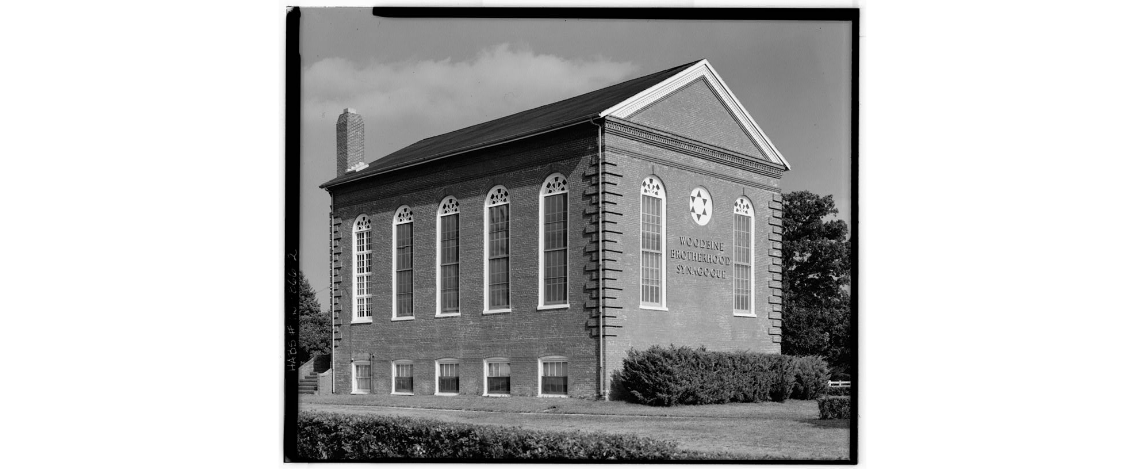
Woodbine Brotherhood Synagogue in Woodbine

Many Jewish immigrants were also recruited for farming in the late 1890s, and small agricultural communities were founded by Jewish charitable organizations. For example, the city of Woodbine was founded in 1903 as the first "the first self-governing Jewish community since the fall of Jerusalem" by the New Jersey state legislature. Baron Maurice de Hirsch helped create the community in 1891 by contributing $37,500 towards buying 5,300 acres of land for 12 aspiring Jewish farmers, and later started the Baron De Hirsch Agricultural School in 1894.

Other agricultural communities founded during this period include Alliance, Brotmanville, Carmel, Rosenhayn, Six Points, Norma and Garton Road. The Paris-based Alliance Israélite Universelle worked in tandem with the de Hirsch Fund to introduce professional administration and crop techniques to the newly resettled immigrants.

== 20th century ==
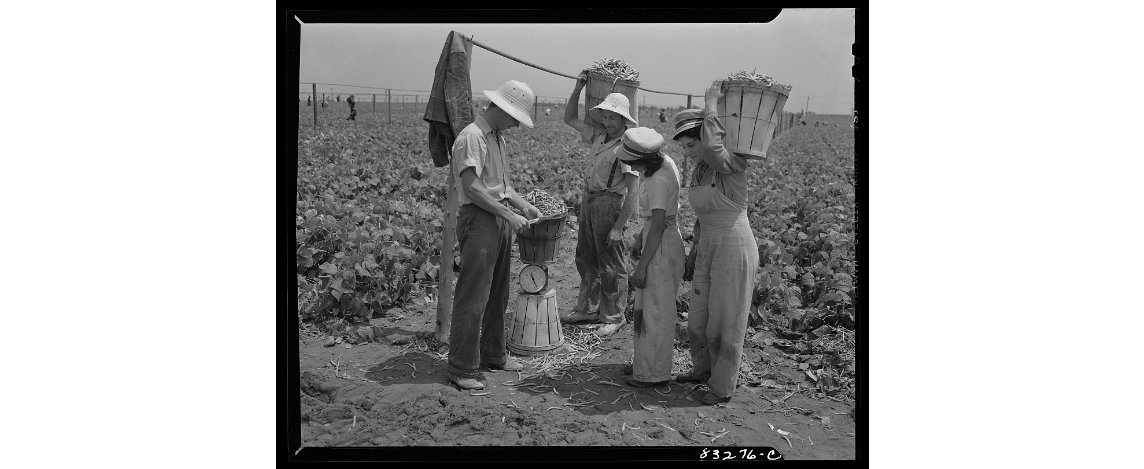
A Jewish family harvesting the bean crop in Bridgeton, New Jersey

The 20th century brought new waves of Jewish immigrants: Sephardic Jews from the Balkans and the Mediterranean in the 1910s who settled in New Brunswick and Atlantic City; Ashkenazi Jews from Russia and Poland fleeing pogroms in the 1920s who moved to Paterson, Jersey City and Newark; and Mizrahi Jews from Syria in the 1970s who moved from Brooklyn to Monmouth County.

=== Urbanization ===
Newark was a common destination for recent Jewish immigrants in the early 1900s: at one point, it had a community of over 80,000 Jews and nearly 100 Jewish cemeteries. Author Philip Roth incorporated his experiences growing up in Newark's Weequahic neighborhood in many of his novels, such as Portnoy's Complaint and The Plot Against America. Weequahic was home to 17 of Newark's 43 synagogues, a Hebrew school and the Hebrew Sheltering Home. In 1930, a third of the state's Jewish population lived in Newark. However, due to suburbanization and the 1967 Newark riots, most of the city's Jewish population left in the 1970s for other towns in Essex County, like Livingston, Millburn and South Orange. By 1977, it is estimated that only 500 Jews remained in the city. The arc of Newark's Jewish community is portrayed in Roth's "American trilogy" of three novels set in Newark: American Pastoral, I Married a Communist and The Human Stain.

Another common destination was Paterson: as there was a thriving silk industry there, many immigrants came from the textile cities of Łódź and Białystok. At the height of the Jewish community, which declined in the later half of the 1900s, Paterson was home to eight synagogues and a mikvah.

New Jersey was also home to the start of many Jewish newspapers during this period, such as the Newarker Wochenblat (1910–1914), the Newark Jewish Chronicle (1921–1942), the Jewish Post (1934–1941), the Jewish Review (1929–Unknown), the Jewish News (1947–Present) and the Yated Ne'eman (1987–Present).

=== Rural Life ===
Roosevelt, New Jersey originally started as a 1930s Great Depression-era planned community project by the Farm Security Administration and Resettlement Administration, in order to resettle Jewish garment workers living in overcrowded tenement housing in New York City and Philadelphia to a cooperative rural colony. The plan for 200 houses, a factory, a farm and three retail stores on the "Jersey Homesteads" site was approved in 1933, and the two architects in charge of implementing the project were Alfred Kastner and Louis Kahn. Houses were advertised in Yiddish newspapers and in union publications, such as the International Ladies Garment Workers Union.

The New Jersey Jewish farming community peaked in 1948, with approximately 100,000 to 150,000 Jews participating in farming. Due to the decline of small-scale farming in New Jersey and the G.I. bill, which allowed returning World War II veterans to go to college, most Jewish farmers had abandoned agriculture by the 1970s.

Rabbi Aharon Kotler moved his yeshiva, Beth Medrash Govoha, to Lakewood, New Jersey in 1943 due to its thriving kosher hospitality industry, feeling the town would be more welcoming to a yeshiva. The yeshiva had 250 students in the 1960s, and over 6,000 by 2022.

== 21st century ==
On a state-wide level, the Jewish population of New Jersey has continued to grow, reflecting migration from New York City to suburbs in the northern half of the state. From 2018 to 2019, the state's Jewish population increased by 103,000 (23%). Most Jews live in Bergen County, Monmouth County, Ocean County, Middlesex County, Union County, and Essex County.

Lakewood has become the second-fastest growing city in the state: it increased by 42,000 people (42%) between 2010 and 2020. This is due to the high birthrate among the majority Orthodox population there, as well as lower cost of living. Several yeshivas also account for an influx of young people moving to the area.

The Jewish Museum of New Jersey opened in 2003. In 2005, the two oldest continuous Jewish families still residing in New Jersey were the Princes and the Louzadas.

In 2019, a shooting was perpetrated by Black Hebrew Israelites in a kosher grocery store in Jersey City. Other modern examples of antisemitism in New Jersey include the Tenafly Adolf Hitler assignment controversy and the 2017–2018 Bergen County eruv controversy.

Rutgers University, the state university of New Jersey, has the largest population of Jewish undergraduate students in America, at approximately 6,000 Jewish undergraduate and 1,000+ Jewish graduate students in 2022. Rutgers is home to a Jewish Studies department, a Hillel International center with a kosher cafe and a Chabad Lubavitch house. The university also offers a minor in Holocaust studies. Approximately 15% of undergraduates at Rutgers are Jewish as of 2015.

== Notable Jews from New Jersey ==
- Judy Blume, author from Elizabeth
- Michael Chertoff, Secretary of Homeland Security from Elizabeth
- Alan Guth, theoretical physicist and cosmologist from New Brunswick
- Allen Klein, American businessman from Newark
- Frank R. Lautenberg, New Jersey United States Senator from Paterson
- Philip Roth, author from Newark
- Nat Arno, commander of the anti-Nazi New Jersey Minutemen
- Moe Berg of Newark, professional baseball player and WWII OSS intelligence operative
