= Olivet, New Jersey =

Populated place in Salem County, New Jersey, US

- Census-designated place
- Location of Olivet in Salem County highlighted in red (left). Inset map: Location of Salem County in New Jersey highlighted in orange (right).New Jersey.

- Location in Salem County Location in New Jersey Location in the United States
- Coordinates: 39.538101°N 75.176334°W
- Country: United States
- State: New Jersey
- County: Salem
- Township: Pittsgrove

Area
  - Total: 2.69 sq mi (6.96 km^{2})
  - Land: 2.49 sq mi (6.45 km^{2})
  - Water: 0.20 sq mi (0.51 km^{2}) 7.29%
- Elevation: 82 ft (25 m)

Population (2020)
  - Total: 1,297
  - Density: 520.9/sq mi (201.11/km^{2})
- Time zone: UTC−05:00 (Eastern (EST))
  - Summer (DST): UTC−04:00 (Eastern (EDT))
- Area code: 856
- FIPS code: 34-54960
- GNIS feature ID: 02389619

Olivet is an unincorporated community and census-designated place (CDP) located within Pittsgrove Township, in Salem County, in the U.S. state of New Jersey. As of the 2020 census, Olivet had a population of 1,297.

== Geography ==
According to the United States Census Bureau, Olivet had a total area of 2.701 square miles (7.00 km^{2}), including 2.504 square miles (6.49 km^{2}) of land and 0.197 square miles (0.51 km^{2}) of water (7.29%).

== Demographics ==
Historical population
Census	Pop.	Note	%±
1990	1,315		—
2000	1,420		8.0%
2010	1,408		−0.8%
2020	1,297		−7.9%
Population sources: 1950 1960 1970; 1980 1990 2000; 2010 2020

Olivet first appeared as a census designated place in the 1990 U.S. census.

=== 2020 census ===
Olivet CDP, New Jersey – Racial and ethnic composition Note: the US Census treats Hispanic/Latino as an ethnic category. This table excludes Latinos from the racial categories and assigns them to a separate category. Hispanics/Latinos may be of any race.
Race / Ethnicity (NH = Non-Hispanic)	Pop 2000	Pop 2010	Pop 2020	% 2000	% 2010	% 2020
White alone (NH)	1,330	1,316	1,126	93.66%	93.47%	86.82%
Black or African American alone (NH)	20	8	17	1.41%	0.57%	1.31%
Native American or Alaska Native alone (NH)	0	0	3	0.00%	0.00%	0.23%
Asian alone (NH)	37	36	20	2.61%	2.56%	1.54%
Native Hawaiian or Pacific Islander alone (NH)	1	0	0	0.07%	0.00%	0.00%
Other race alone (NH)	3	0	13	0.21%	0.00%	1.00%
Mixed race or Multiracial (NH)	9	10	40	0.63%	0.71%	3.08%
Hispanic or Latino (any race)	20	38	78	1.41%	2.70%	6.01%
Total	1,420	1,408	1,297	100.00%	100.00%	100.00%

=== 2010 census ===
The 2010 United States census counted 1,408 people, 477 households, and 411 families in the CDP. The population density was 562.3 people per square mile (217.1 people/km^{2}). There were 490 housing units at an average density of 195.7 units per square mile (75.6 units/km^{2}). The racial makeup was 95.31% (1,342) White, 0.64% (9) Black or African American, 0.00% (0) Native American, 2.56% (36) Asian, 0.00% (0) Pacific Islander, 0.64% (9) from other races, and 0.85% (12) from two or more races. Hispanic or Latino of any race were 2.70% (38) of the population.

Of the 477 households, 37.5% had children under the age of 18; 75.5% were married couples living together; 6.9% had a female householder with no husband present and 13.8% were non-families. Of all households, 11.7% were made up of individuals and 3.6% had someone living alone who was 65 years of age or older. The average household size was 2.95 and the average family size was 3.18.

24.1% of the population were under the age of 18, 8.9% from 18 to 24, 23.5% from 25 to 44, 35.0% from 45 to 64, and 8.4% who were 65 years of age or older. The median age was 40.4 years. For every 100 females, the population had 100.9 males. For every 100 females ages 18 and older there were 97.8 males.

=== 2000 census ===
As of the 2000 United States census there were 1,420 people, 460 households, and 419 families living in the CDP. The population density was 220.2 people/km^{2} (570 people/mi^{2}). There were 467 housing units at an average density of 72.4 units/km^{2} (188 units/mi^{2}). The racial makeup of the CDP was 94.37% White, 1.41% African American, 2.61% Asian, 0.07% Pacific Islander, 0.70% from other races, and 0.85% from two or more races. Hispanic or Latino of any race were 1.41% of the population.

There were 460 households, out of which 51.1% had children under the age of 18 living with them, 80.9% were married couples living together, 7.2% had a female householder with no husband present, and 8.7% were non-families. 7.0% of all households were made up of individuals, and 1.5% had someone living alone who was 65 years of age or older. The average household size was 3.09 and the average family size was 3.23.

In the CDP the population was spread out, with 30.4% under the age of 18, 7.4% from 18 to 24, 26.5% from 25 to 44, 29.8% from 45 to 64, and 5.9% who were 65 years of age or older. The median age was 39 years. For every 100 females, there were 105.8 males. For every 100 females age 18 and over, there were 97.2 males.

The median income for a household in the CDP was $71,893, and the median income for a family was $74,000. Males had a median income of $52,016 versus $28,641 for females. The per capita income for the CDP was $28,981. About 2.5% of families and 3.7% of the population were below the poverty line, including 9.7% of those under age 18 and none of those age 65 or over.

== Education ==
All of Pittsgrove Township, including Olivet, is within the Pittsgrove Township School District.
