= Helmbrecht =

Helmbrecht or Helmbrechts may refer to:

- Helmbrechts
- VfB Helmbrechts
- Helmbrechts concentration camp
- Melissa Helmbrecht
- Meier Helmbrecht (play)
