= Elmer, New Jersey =

Borough in Salem County, New Jersey, US

- Borough
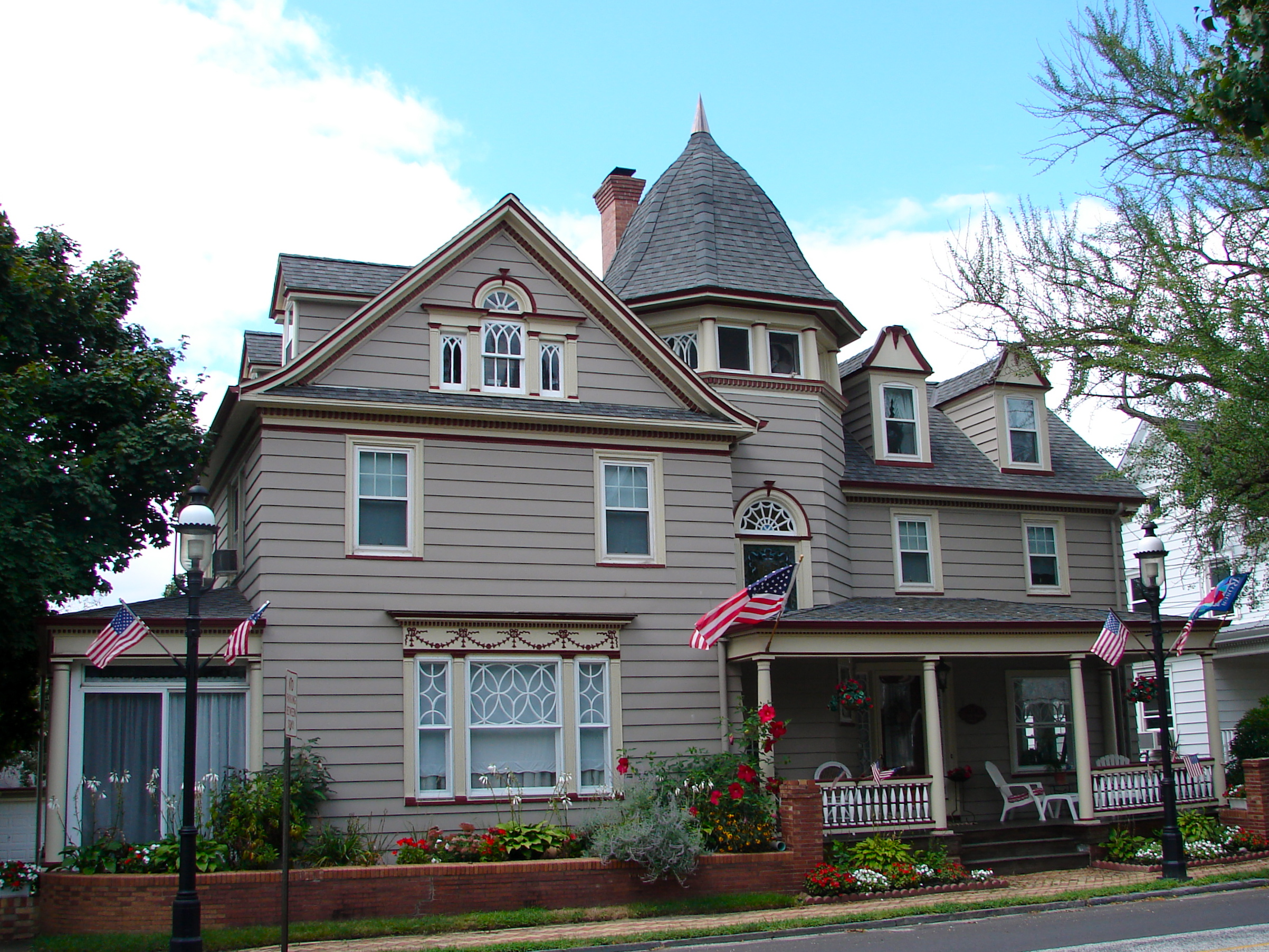
- David V. Smith House
- Nickname: "The Small Town with the Big Welcome"
- Location within Salem County. Inset: Location of Salem County in New Jersey

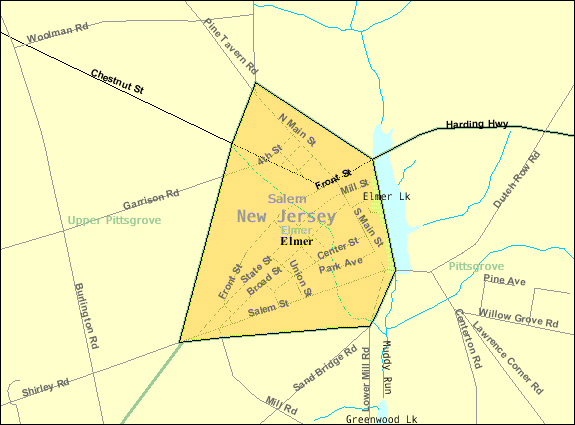
- Census Bureau map

- Location in Salem County Location in New Jersey Location in the United States
- Coordinates: 39.592258°N 75.174569°W
- Country: United States
- State: New Jersey
- County: Salem
- Incorporated: January 28, 1893
- Named for: Lucius Elmer

Government
  - Type: Borough
  - Body: Borough Council
  - Mayor: Joseph P. Stemberger (D, term ends December 31, 2023)
  - Municipal clerk: Sarah D. Walker

Area
  - Total: 0.91 sq mi (2.35 km^{2})
  - Land: 0.89 sq mi (2.30 km^{2})
  - Water: 0.019 sq mi (0.05 km^{2}) 2.20%
  - Rank: 513th of 565 in state 14th of 15 in county
- Elevation: 115 ft (35 m)

Population (2020)
  - Total: 1,347
  - Estimate (2023): 1,368
  - Rank: 521st of 565 in state 14th of 15 in county
  - Density: 1,507.2/sq mi (581.9/km^{2})
  - Rank: 334th of 565 in state 4th of 15 in county
- Time zone: UTC−05:00 (Eastern (EST))
  - Summer (DST): UTC−04:00 (Eastern (EDT))
- ZIP Code: 08318
- Area code: 856
- FIPS code: 3403321240
- GNIS feature ID: 885206
- Website: www.elmerboroughnj.com

Elmer is a borough in Salem County in the U.S. state of New Jersey. As of the 2020 United States census, the borough's population was 1,347, a decrease of 48 (−3.4%) from the 2010 census count of 1,395, which in turn reflected an increase of 11 (+0.8%) from the 1,384 counted in the 2000 census. It was the home of the annual Appel Farm Arts and Music Festival, which celebrated its 23rd and final year in 2012.

== History ==
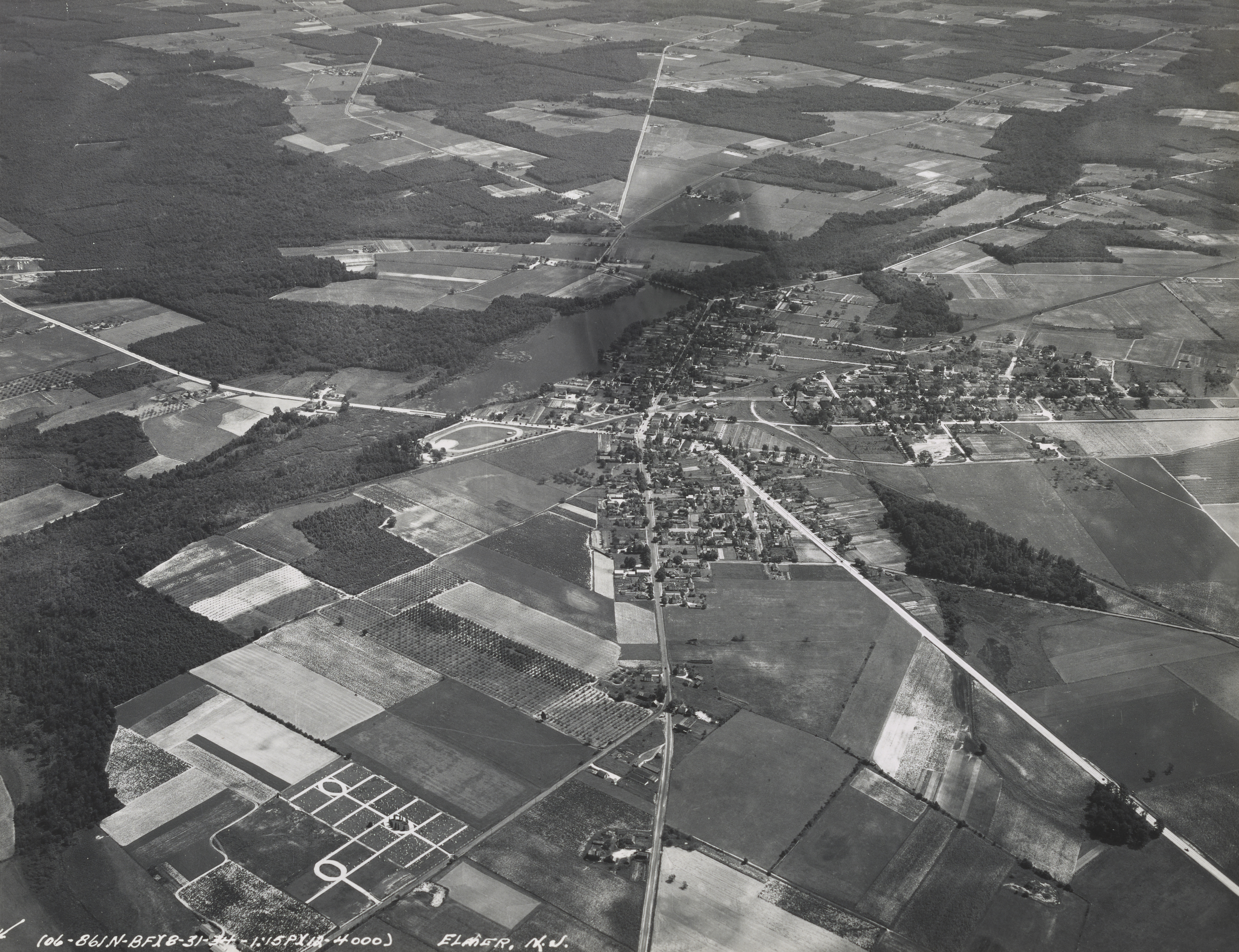
Old aerial image of Elmer

Elmer was incorporated as a borough by an act of the New Jersey Legislature on January 28, 1893, from portions of Pittsgrove Township and Upper Pittsgrove Township, based on the results of a referendum held four days earlier.} The borough was named for Lucius Elmer a former judge who helped obtain a post office for the community during his service as Congressman.

Elmer is a dry town where alcohol is not permitted to be sold legally.

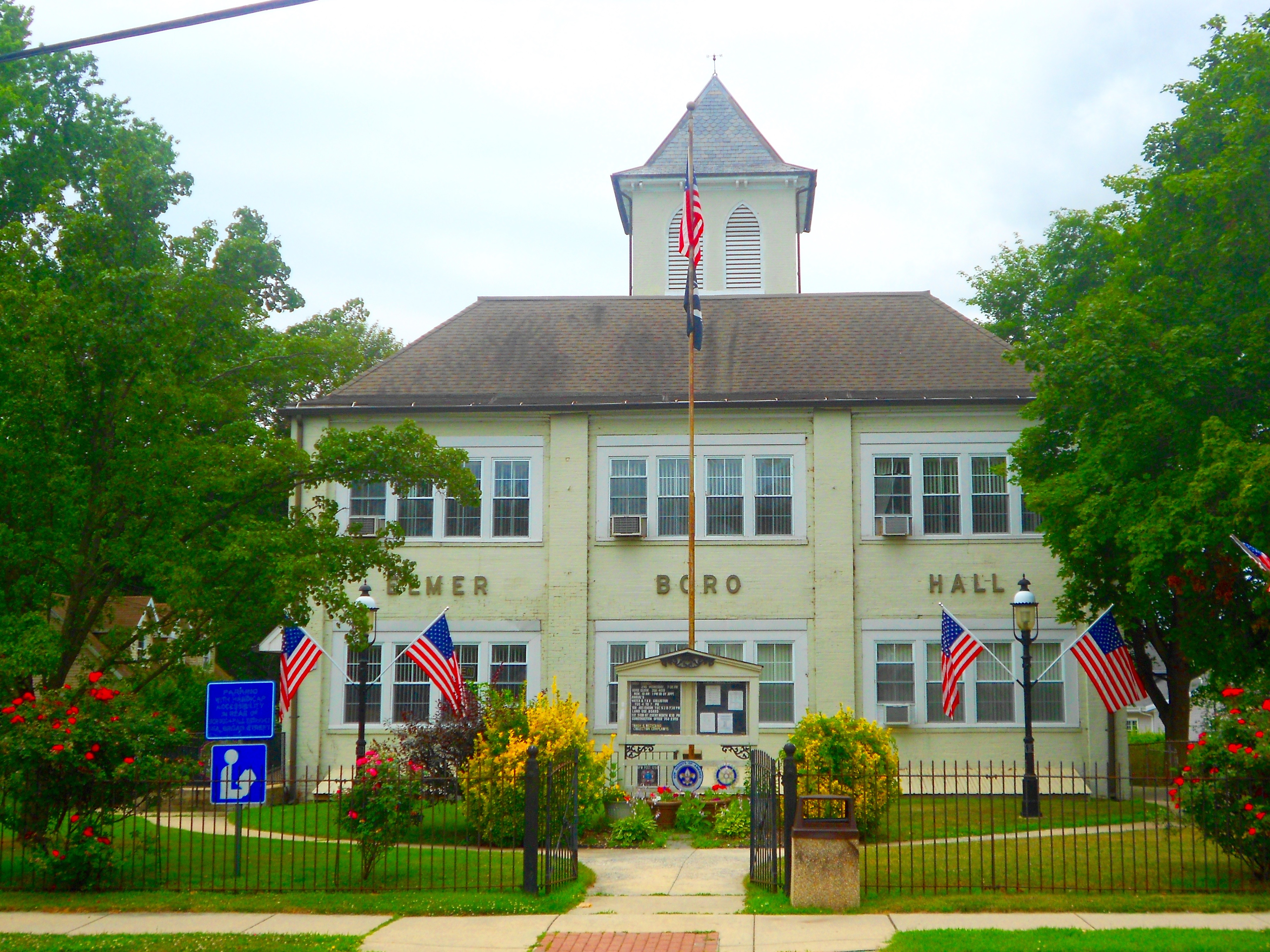
Borough Hall

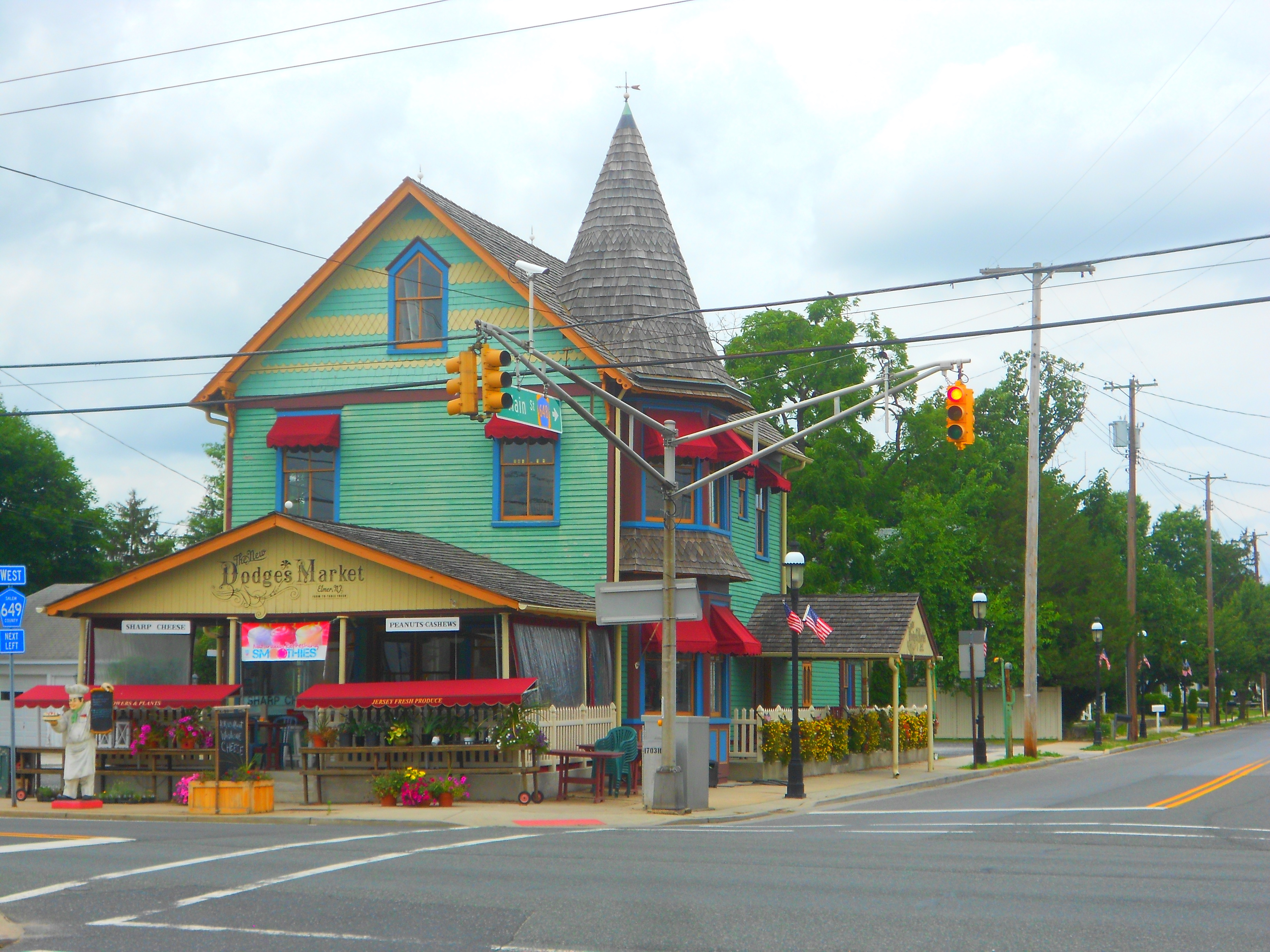
Market on US 40

== Geography ==
According to the United States Census Bureau, the borough had a total area of 0.91 square miles (2.37 km^{2}), including 0.89 square miles (2.31 km^{2}) of land and 0.02 square miles (0.05 km^{2}) of water (2.20%).

The borough borders Pittsgrove Township and Upper Pittsgrove Township.

The borough is located on U.S. Route 40.

== Demographics ==
Historical population
Census	Pop.	Note	%±
1880	345		—
1890	842		144.1%
1900	1,140		35.4%
1910	1,167		2.4%
1920	1,115		−4.5%
1930	1,219		9.3%
1940	1,344		10.3%
1950	1,460		8.6%
1960	1,505		3.1%
1970	1,592		5.8%
1980	1,569		−1.4%
1990	1,571		0.1%
2000	1,384		−11.9%
2010	1,395		0.8%
2020	1,347		−3.4%
2023 (est.)	1,368	▲	1.6%
Population sources: 1880–1890; 1900–2000 1900–1920; 1900–1910 1910–1930; 1940–2000 2000; 2010 2020

=== 2010 census ===
The 2010 United States census counted 1,395 people, 536 households, and 391 families in the borough. The population density was 1,612.3 inhabitants per square mile (622.5/km^{2}). There were 577 housing units at an average density of 666.9 per square mile (257.5/km^{2}). The racial makeup was 94.05% (1,312) White, 2.15% (30) Black or African American, 0.57% (8) Native American, 0.79% (11) Asian, 0.00% (0) Pacific Islander, 1.29% (18) from other races, and 1.15% (16) from two or more races. Hispanic or Latino of any race were 3.15% (44) of the population.

Of the 536 households, 31.3% had children under the age of 18; 51.5% were married couples living together; 13.6% had a female householder with no husband present and 27.1% were non-families. Of all households, 22.2% were made up of individuals and 9.3% had someone living alone who was 65 years of age or older. The average household size was 2.60 and the average family size was 3.00.

22.8% of the population were under the age of 18, 8.3% from 18 to 24, 28.5% from 25 to 44, 26.5% from 45 to 64, and 14.0% who were 65 years of age or older. The median age was 39.1 years. For every 100 females, the population had 95.7 males. For every 100 females ages 18 and older there were 96.5 males.

The Census Bureau's 2006–2010 American Community Survey showed that (in 2010 inflation-adjusted dollars) median household income was $65,417 (with a margin of error of +/− $8,616) and the median family income was $78,661 (+/− $5,812). Males had a median income of $51,685 (+/− $7,458) versus $41,042 (+/− $9,148) for females. The per capita income for the borough was $29,065 (+/− $2,585). About 7.8% of families and 6.5% of the population were below the poverty line, including 8.7% of those under age 18 and 6.8% of those age 65 or over.

=== 2000 census ===
As of the 2000 United States census there were 1,384 people, 524 households, and 385 families residing in the borough. The population density was 1,599.5 inhabitants per square mile (617.6/km^{2}). There were 557 housing units at an average density of 643.7 per square mile (248.5/km^{2}). The racial makeup of the borough was 97.25% White, 0.65% African American, 0.51% Asian, 0.72% from other races, and 0.87% from two or more races. Hispanic or Latino of any race were 1.52% of the population.

There were 524 households, out of which 35.7% had children under the age of 18 living with them, 58.0% were married couples living together, 11.6% had a female householder with no husband present, and 26.5% were non-families. 22.3% of all households were made up of individuals, and 10.1% had someone living alone who was 65 years of age or older. The average household size was 2.61 and the average family size was 3.06.

In the borough the population was spread out, with 24.4% under the age of 18, 8.6% from 18 to 24, 29.8% from 25 to 44, 21.7% from 45 to 64, and 15.5% who were 65 years of age or older. The median age was 37 years. For every 100 females, there were 94.1 males. For every 100 females age 18 and over, there were 87.5 males.

The median income for a household in the borough was $46,172, and the median income for a family was $58,438. Males had a median income of $39,896 versus $27,583 for females. The per capita income for the borough was $21,356. About 4.6% of families and 5.3% of the population were below the poverty line, including 6.2% of those under age 18 and 3.3% of those age 65 or over.

== Government ==
=== Local government ===
Elmer is governed under the borough form of New Jersey municipal government, which is used in 218 municipalities (of the 564) statewide, making it the most common form of government in New Jersey. The governing body is comprised of the mayor and the borough council, with all positions elected at-large on a partisan basis as part of the November general election. The mayor is elected directly by the voters to a four-year term of office. The borough council includes six members elected to serve three-year terms on a staggered basis, with two seats coming up for election each year in a three-year cycle. The borough form of government used by Elmer is a "weak mayor / strong council" government in which council members act as the legislative body with the mayor presiding at meetings and voting only in the event of a tie. The mayor can veto ordinances subject to an override by a two-thirds majority vote of the council. The mayor makes committee and liaison assignments for council members, and most appointments are made by the mayor with the advice and consent of the council.

As of 2022, the mayor of Elmer Borough is Democrat Joseph P. Stemberger, whose term of office expires on December 31, 2023. Members of the Elmer Borough Council are Council President Lewis M. Schneider (R, 2024), Lynda Davis (R, 2022), Bruce Foster (R, 2023), Cynthia L. Nolan (R, 2023), Steven A. Schalick (R, 2022) and James W. Zee, III (R, 2024).

In February 2019, the borough council selected Bruce Foster from three candidates nominated by the Republican municipal committee to fill the seat expiring in December 2020 that became vacant following the resignation of R. Matthew Richards the previous month. Foster served on an interim basis until the November 2019 general election, when he was elected to serve the balance of the term of office.

=== Federal, state and county representation ===
Elmer is located in the 2nd Congressional District and is part of New Jersey's 3rd state legislative district.

For the 119th United States Congress, New Jersey's 2nd congressional district is represented by Jeff Van Drew (R, Dennis Township). New Jersey is represented in the United States Senate by Democrats Cory Booker (Newark, term ends 2027) and Andy Kim (Moorestown, term ends 2031).

For the 2026–2027 session, the 3rd legislative district of the New Jersey Legislature is represented in the State Senate by John Burzichelli (D, Paulsboro) and in the General Assembly by David Bailey (D, Woodstown) and Heather Simmons (D, Glassboro).

Salem County is governed by a five-member Board of County Commissioners who are elected at-large to serve three-year terms of office on a staggered basis, with either one or two seats coming up for election each year. At an annual reorganization meeting held in the beginning of January, the board selects a Director and a Deputy Director from among its members. As of 2025, Salem County's Commissioners (with party, residence, and term-end year listed in parentheses) are:

Director Benjamin H. Laury (R, Elmer, 2027), Deputy Director Cordy Taylor (R, Oldmans Township, 2028), Paul Collier (R, Lower Alloways Creek, 2027), Ed Ramsey (R, Pittsgrove Township, 2026), and Daniel Timmerman (R, Elmer, 2028).

Constitutional officers elected on a countywide basis are: Clerk Dale A. Cross (R, Pennsville Township, 2029), Sheriff Charles M. Miller (R, Salem, 2027) and Surrogate Gordon J. Ostrum Jr. (R, Pilesgrove Township, 2030).

=== Politics ===
As of March 2011, there were a total of 852 registered voters in Elmer, of whom 201 (23.6% vs. 30.6% countywide) were registered as Democrats, 253 (29.7% vs. 21.0%) were registered as Republicans and 397 (46.6% vs. 48.4%) were registered as Unaffiliated. There was one voter registered to another party. Among the borough's 2010 Census population, 61.1% (vs. 64.6% in Salem County) were registered to vote, including 79.1% of those ages 18 and over (vs. 84.4% countywide).

Gubernatorial election results for Elmer
Year	Republican		Democratic		Third party(ies)	
Year	No.	%	No.	%	No.	%
2025	336	61.20%	210	38.25%	3	0.55%
2021	297	67.65%	130	29.61%	12	2.73%
2017	204	56.20%	136	37.47%	23	6.34%
2013	329	75.46%	95	21.79%	12	2.75%
2009	234	54.17%	155	35.88%	43	9.95%
2005	261	54.60%	191	39.96%	26	5.44%

In the 2012 presidential election, Republican Mitt Romney received 60.4% of the vote (356 cast), ahead of Democrat Barack Obama with 38.0% (224 votes), and other candidates with 1.5% (9 votes), among the 593 ballots cast by the borough's 875 registered voters (4 ballots were spoiled), for a turnout of 67.8%. In the 2008 presidential election, Republican John McCain received 375 votes (56.4% vs. 46.6% countywide), ahead of Democrat Barack Obama with 261 votes (39.2% vs. 50.4%) and other candidates with 15 votes (2.3% vs. 1.6%), among the 665 ballots cast by the borough's 892 registered voters, for a turnout of 74.6% (vs. 71.8% in Salem County). In the 2004 presidential election, Republican George W. Bush received 414 votes (62.4% vs. 52.5% countywide), ahead of Democrat John Kerry with 242 votes (36.5% vs. 45.9%) and other candidates with 5 votes (0.8% vs. 1.0%), among the 663 ballots cast by the borough's 904 registered voters, for a turnout of 73.3% (vs. 71.0% in the whole county).

United States presidential election results for Elmer 2024 2020 2016 2012 2008 2004
Year	Republican		Democratic		Third party(ies)	
Year	No.	%	No.	%	No.	%
2024	450	63.65%	247	34.94%	10	1.41%
2020	469	63.55%	248	33.60%	21	2.85%
2016	395	64.44%	181	29.53%	37	6.04%
2012	356	60.44%	224	38.03%	9	1.53%
2008	375	57.60%	261	40.09%	15	2.30%
2004	414	62.63%	242	36.61%	5	0.76%

In the 2013 gubernatorial election, Republican Chris Christie received 75.5% of the vote (329 cast), ahead of Democrat Barbara Buono with 21.8% (95 votes), and other candidates with 2.8% (12 votes), among the 440 ballots cast by the borough's 897 registered voters (4 ballots were spoiled), for a turnout of 49.1%. In the 2009 gubernatorial election, Republican Chris Christie received 234 votes (53.8% vs. 46.1% countywide), ahead of Democrat Jon Corzine with 155 votes (35.6% vs. 39.9%), Independent Chris Daggett with 38 votes (8.7% vs. 9.7%) and other candidates with 5 votes (1.1% vs. 2.0%), among the 435 ballots cast by the borough's 876 registered voters, yielding a 49.7% turnout (vs. 47.3% in the county).

United States Senate election results for Elmer1
Year	Republican		Democratic		Third party(ies)	
Year	No.	%	No.	%	No.	%
2024	421	60.84%	247	35.69%	24	3.47%
2018	319	64.57%	151	30.57%	24	4.86%
2012	315	54.88%	240	41.81%	19	3.31%
2006	278	56.85%	188	38.45%	23	4.70%

United States Senate election results for Elmer2
Year	Republican		Democratic		Third party(ies)	
Year	No.	%	No.	%	No.	%
2020	459	62.45%	255	34.69%	21	2.86%
2014	230	60.05%	138	36.03%	15	3.92%
2013	148	62.98%	81	34.47%	6	2.55%
2008	338	52.90%	277	43.35%	24	3.76%

== Education ==
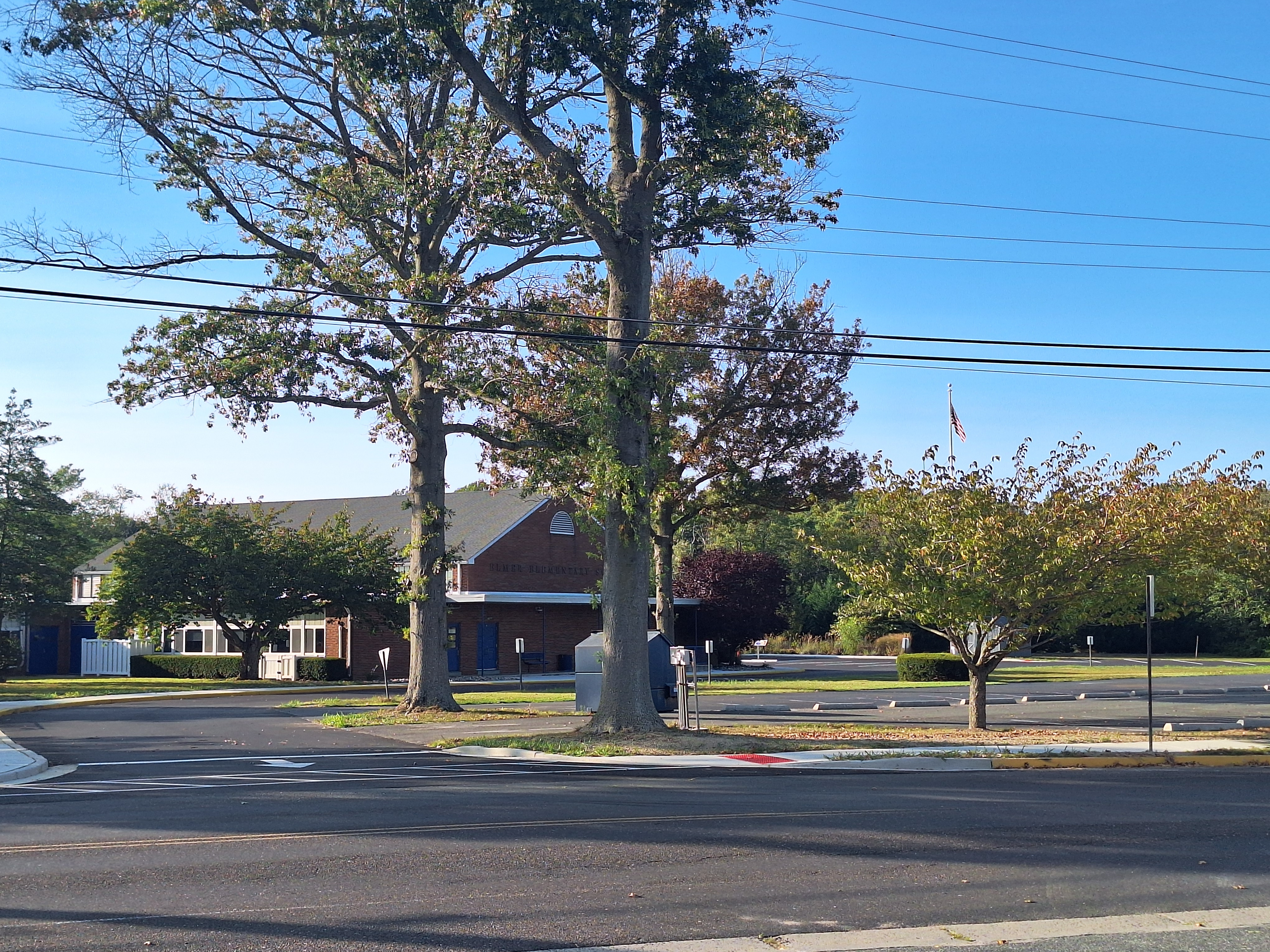
Elmer Elementary School (now of Pittsgrove Township School District, formerly of the Elmer School District)

Public school students from Elmer and Pittsgrove Township attend the Pittsgrove Township School District for kindergarten through twelfth grade as part of a full sending/receiving relationship in which the former Elmer School was integrated into the district as of 2011 and students from both Elmer and Pittsgrove Township attend school together throughout their education.

Previously the municipality was served by the Elmer School District, an elementary school district. As of May 2010, Elmer students began attending the schools of the Pittsgrove Township School District at all elementary levels as part of a full sending/receiving relationship in which the former Elmer School became integrated into the district and Elmer and Pittsgrove Township students began to attend school together throughout their education. Initially this was done as part of a full sending/receiving relationship from Elmer to Pittsgrove Township. The Elmer School District fully dissolved after the 2016–17 school year and was absorbed by the Pittsgrove Township district, which paid $620,000 to acquire the Elmer School facility. The state forgave the remaining $2.8 million that was owed by the Elmer district.

As of the 2023–24 school year, the district, comprised of five schools, had an enrollment of 1,680 students and 142.9 classroom teachers (on an FTE basis), for a student–teacher ratio of 11.8:1. Schools in the district (with 2023–24 enrollment data from the National Center for Education Statistics) are Norma Elementary School with 131 students in grades PreK–K, Elmer Elementary School with 197 students in grades 1–2, Olivet Elementary School with 351 students in grades 3–5, Pittsgrove Township Middle School with 483 students in grades 6–8 and A.P. Schalick High School with 478 students in grades 9–12.

== Transportation ==
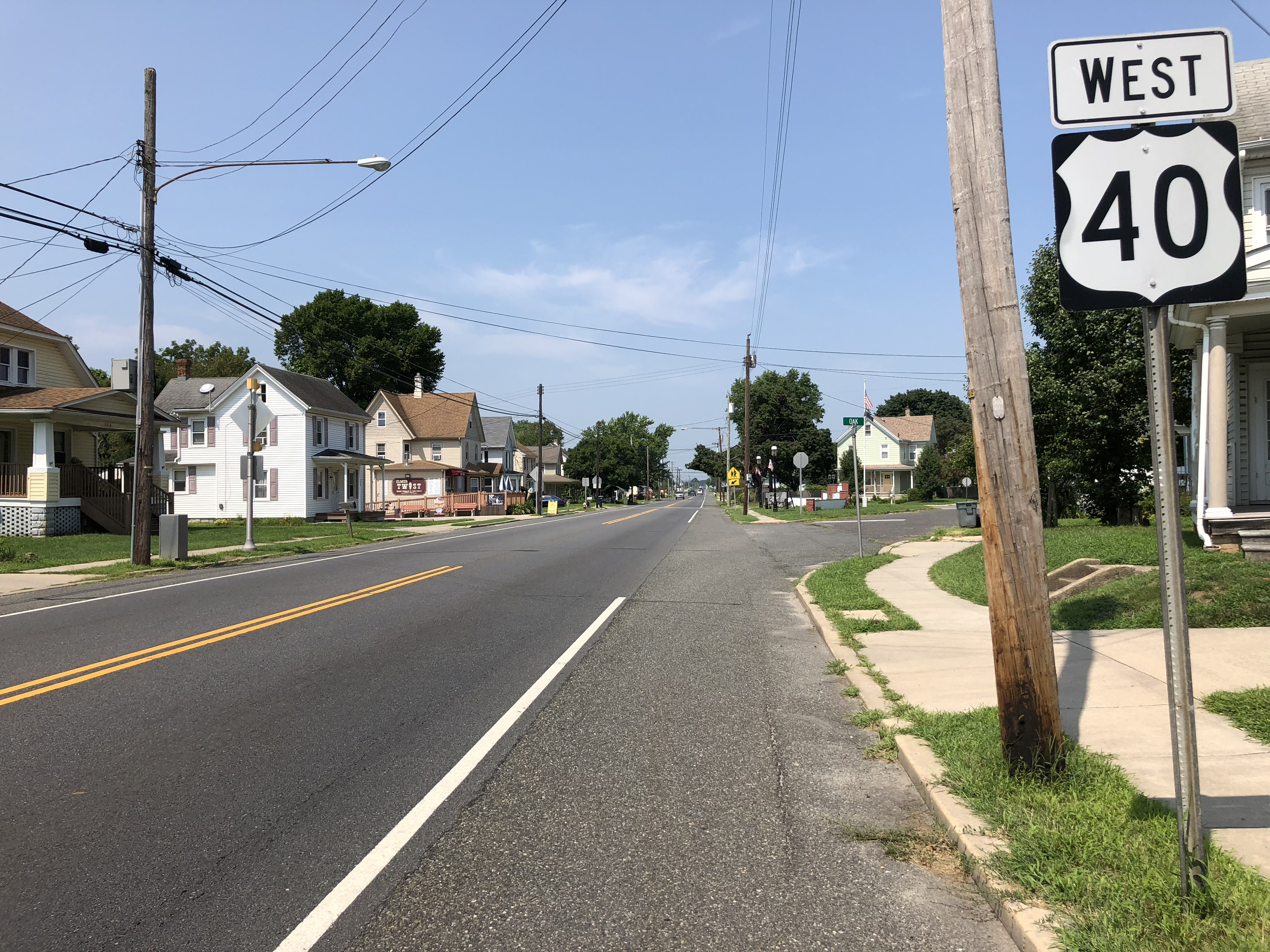
U.S. Route 40 westbound in Elmer

As of May 2010, the borough had a total of 9.54 miles (15.35 km) of roadways, of which 5.18 miles (8.34 km) were maintained by the municipality, 3.67 miles (5.91 km) by Salem County and 0.69 miles (1.11 km) by the New Jersey Department of Transportation.

U.S. Route 40 is the main highway serving Elmer.

== Notable people ==
People who were born in, residents of, or otherwise closely associated with Elmer include:

- Todd Barranger (born 1968), professional golfer
- King Brady (1881–1947), MLB pitcher
- Mulford B. Foster (1888–1978), botanist known as the "Father of the Bromeliad"
- David Mixner (1946–2024), civil rights activist and author
- David A. Schauer (born 1961, class of 1979) radiation physicist
- Tiernny Wiltshire (born 1998), soccer forward for the Jamaica women's national team
