= Norma, New Jersey =

US historical Jewish settlement

- Unincorporated community
- Norma's location in Salem County (Inset: Salem County in New Jersey) Norma, New Jersey (New Jersey) Norma, New Jersey (the United States)
- Coordinates: 39°29′46″N 75°05′17″W
- Country: United States
- State: New Jersey
- County: Salem
- Township: Pittsgrove
- Elevation: 82 ft (25 m)
- Time zone: UTC−05:00 (Eastern (EST))
  - Summer (DST): UTC−04:00 (EDT)
- ZIP Code: 08347
- Area code: 856
- GNIS feature ID: 878816

Norma is an unincorporated community located within Pittsgrove Township in Salem County, in the U.S. state of New Jersey. Norma is located at the junction of County Routes 540 and 638, west of Vineland. Norma has a post office with ZIP Code 08347, which opened on June 29, 1888.

Norma is serviced by Pittsgrove Township School District. There is an elementary school within the town, currently enrolled 125 students which only offers pre-kindergarten. Year on year enrollment has been declining. The school is classified as fringe rural.

According to the 2020 census, Pittsgrove Township has a population of about 8,800 people. It is estimated about 500 people live in Norma. There are currently a number of churches in the town, including a Mennonite church, a baptist church and missionary. Norma has experienced population decline since the early 2000s.

== History ==
Norma was established, alongside the two other communities of Alliance and Brotmanville as agriculture settlements by Jewish Russian immigrants in the late nineteenth century. At the time of settlement, three million jews lived in a part of Russia known as the Pale, with severe restrictions on access to land. Norma was selected as a site for a Jewish agriculture community by international philanthropic groups who wanted to support the ability for Jewish farmers, under pressure in Russia, to have access to agriculture land. With assistance from the international aid organizations, a small group of Jews were relocated to this area, alongside other agriculture settlements, which were fairly uninhabited, to avoid integration issues within existing cities and allow them to continue to work in agriculture. Norma was established through funds provided by the Baron de Hirsch Fund, with ongoing support to farmers provided by the Jewish Agriculture and Industrial Society.

In 1897, the synagogue in Norma was established. In 1889, a marketing cooperative was established by farmers, where the produce grown in the settlement was sold to markets in neighboring Philadelphia.

By 1890, Norma was an independent community. In contrast to the neighboring towns, Norma had railway access in town, and by 1901, a cannery was built. In 1926, the town received electricity access, and by 1928 was the first town in Salem County to use streetlights. The town continued to attract Jewish immigrants through the 1940s, although the community remained small.

== See also ==
- Alliance colony
- Brotmanville
- Jewish immigration to the US
- Jewish agricultural colonies in the Russian Empire
- Jewish Colonisation Association
