= New Jersey Minutemen =

Mob-organized pre-WWII anti-fascist and anti-Nazi supporter group

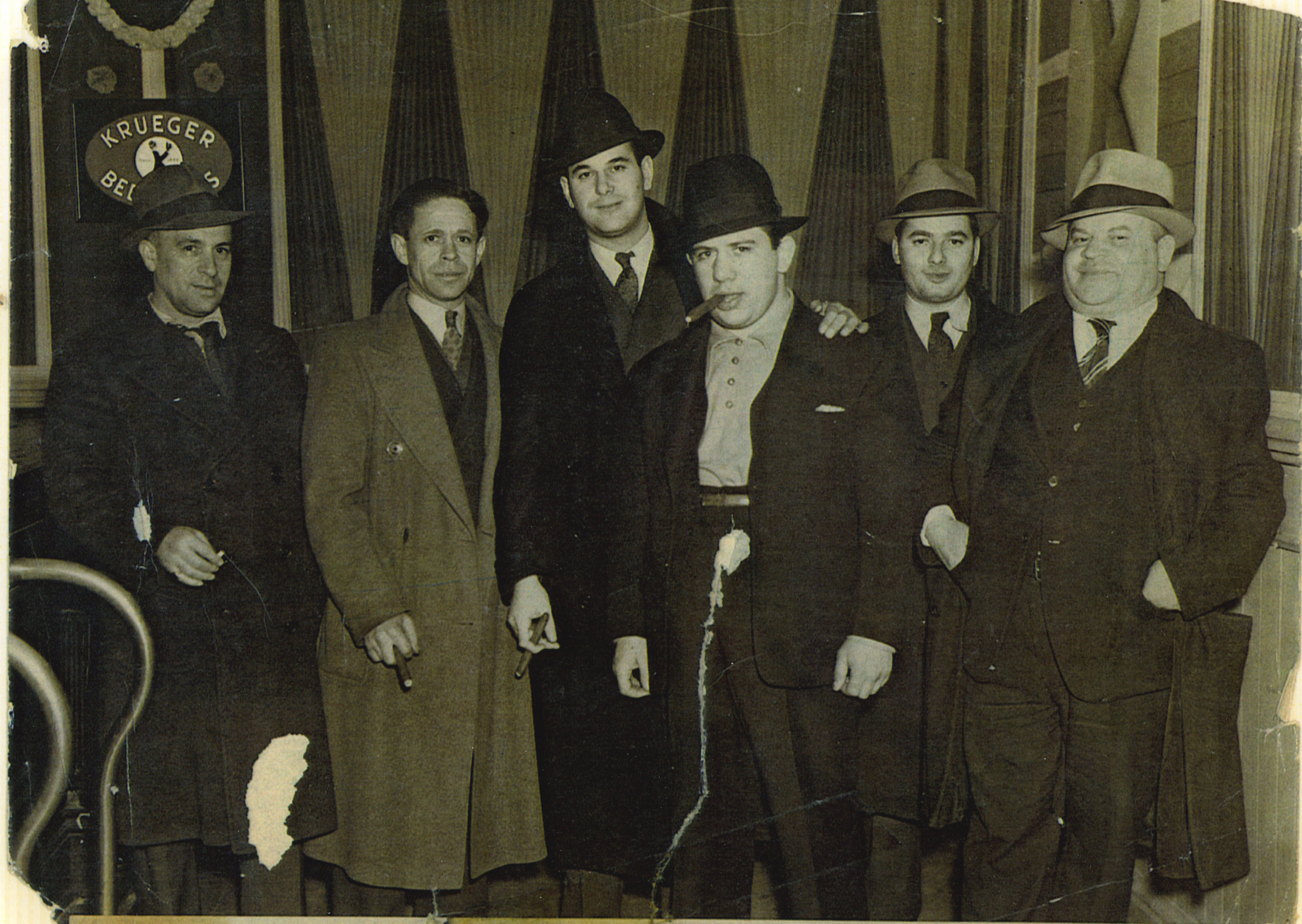
Nat Arno (center) with the Minutemen

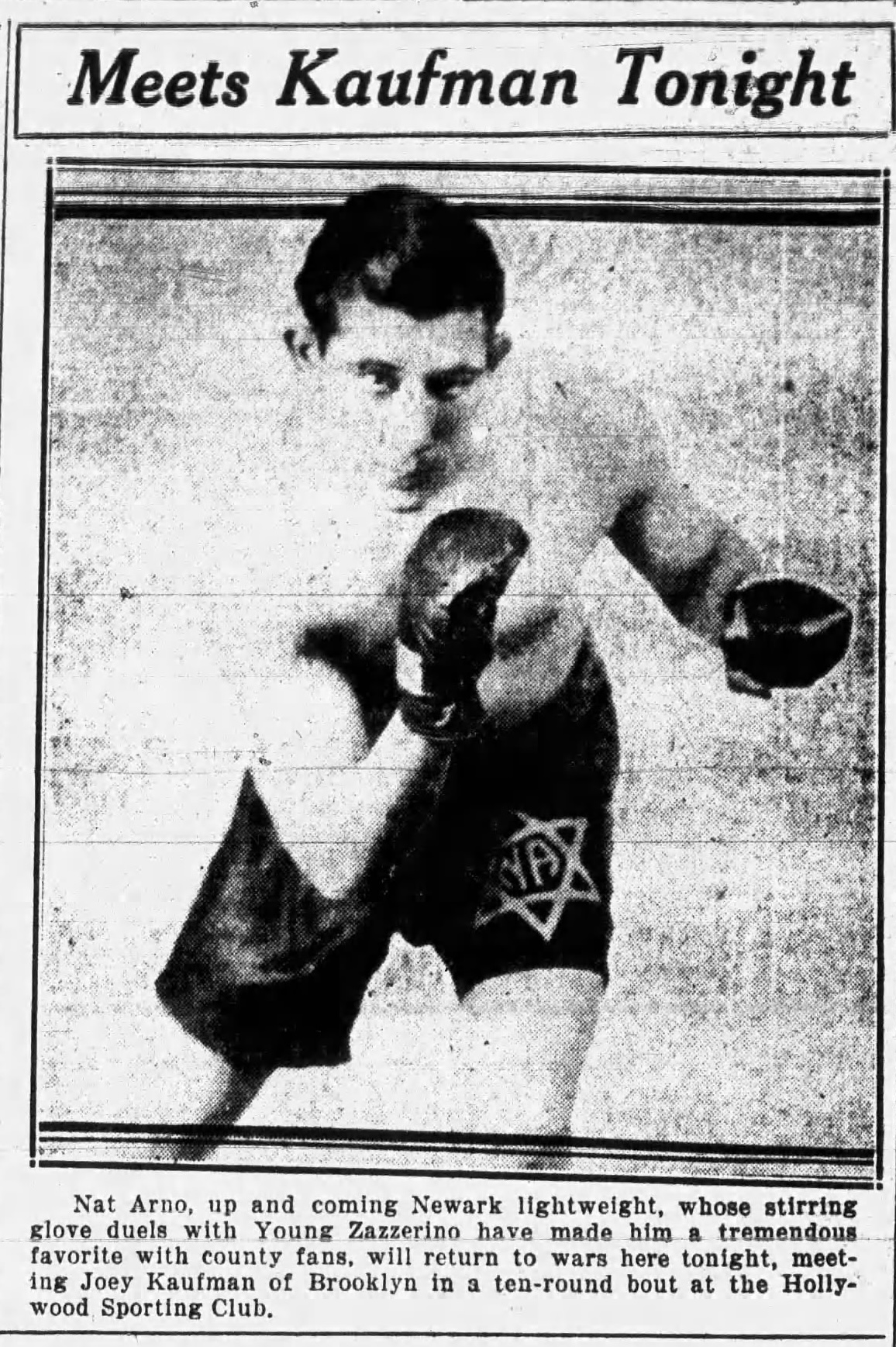
Nat Arno (The Bayonne Times, 1931)

The New Jersey Minutemen were a militant anti-fascist group that operated in Newark, New Jersey, from 1933 to 1941. They were antagonists of the pro-Nazi German American Bund and the Christian Front group inspired by Charles Coughlin's Social Justice doctrines. The commander of the Minutemen was a former featherweight and lightweight class boxer of Jewish ancestry, Nat Arno, born Sidney Nathan Abramowitz (April 1, 1910 – August 8, 1973). The group was organized at the behest of New Jersey–based Jewish-American organized crime leader Abner Zwillman. The membership consisted of "tough guys...recruited from Zwillman's Third Ward gang." According to one historian, "The mob hastened the Bund's demise by introducing mortal risks to its leadership."

The Minutemen initially attacked a meeting of Friends of New Germany with pipes wrapped in cloth or rubber; three Friends of New Germany were injured. This was followed shortly thereafter by a massive street fight outside the Schwabenhalle in Irvington, a brawl that encompassed nearly 2,000 people over 12 city blocks, 20 injuries with three hospitalizations, and seven arrests. Two men in a black sedan shot at Nat Arno and another Anti-Nazi Minutemen leader Max Feilshus on Fourth of July 1934; Feilshus was hit in both legs.

The "hoodlums" of the Minutemen coordinated with S. William Kalb of the respectable Non-Sectarian Anti-Nazi League. They had different approaches to the shared goal of disarming antisemitism and Nazism in New Jersey before World War II.

A similar program dedicated to punching Nazis was organized by Meyer Lansky in New York. Lansky's efforts—which included 1938's so-called Battle of Yorkville Casino, in which 60 Jewish-American World War I vets wearing American Legion caps fought the 1,000-strong German American Bund at a birthday party for Hitler—were partly at the behest of former U.S. Congressman Nathan Perlman and Rabbi Stephen S. Wise. Lansky put together a team for this work that included the likes of Bugsy Siegel, Lepke Buchalter, Gurrah Shapiro, Tick Tock Tannenbaum, and Blue Jaw Magoon. Lansky and Siegel declined an offer of payment for these services, considering it, rather, a duty and an honor. Lansky, who referred to the Bundists as brownshirts, later said "The main point was to teach them that Jews couldn't be kicked around."

In both states, respectable leadership involved with the campaign specified "no killing please" even though the lower-level muscle were willing to provide additional violence. Meanwhile, opposing the rise of American fascism was sound policy for criminal underground leaders whose business prospects would likely be compromised by the rise of an authoritarian regime; Mussolini, for his part, had not been a particular ally of the Sicilian Mafia.

The New Jersey Minutemen took their name from the Continental Minutemen rapid-reaction militia of the American Revolutionary War. The slogan of the New Jersey Minutemen was "No Ism But American-Ism."

Nat Arno enlisted on January 1, 1941, and served as a sergeant in the infantry of the U.S. Army during World War II. He later moved to California, started a family there and died in 1973.

== See also ==
- Bugs and Meyer Mob
- Jewish-American organized crime
- History of the Jews in New Jersey
- Nazism in the Americas
- Operation Underworld
