= Paul Gause =

American basketball player (born 1986)

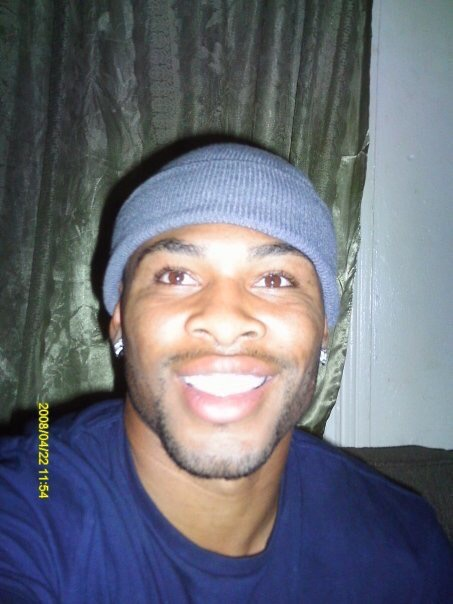
- Selfie of Gause, 2008

Personal information
- Born: February 18, 1986 (age 40) Vineland, New Jersey
- Listed height: 6 ft 0 in (1.83 m)
- Listed weight: 205 lb (93 kg)

Career information
- High school: Schalick (Pittsgrove, New Jersey)
- College: Seton Hall (2005–2009)
- NBA draft: 2009: undrafted
- Playing career: 2010–2015
- Position: Shooting guard / point guard

Career history
- 2010–2011: USC Freiburg
- 2011–2012: Newcastle Eagles
- 2012: ASS Sale
- 2012–2013: BC Prievidza
- 2013–2015: Newcastle Eagles
- 2015: ASS Sale

Paul Gause (born February 18, 1986) is an American former professional basketball player.

== Early years ==
=== Basketball ===
Gause played basketball for Arthur P. Schalick High School in Pittsgrove Township, New Jersey, from 2001 to 2005. A four-year starter, Gause averaged over 25 points per game as a freshman, 27+ as a sophomore and 30+ per game his junior and senior seasons. He set a school single-game scoring record on February 26, 2004, when he dropped 52 points on Overbrook High School in a 94–80 win.

During his senior campaign in 2004–05, Gause led Schalick to a 25–5 record and its first ever boys' basketball South Jersey Group I championship, as well as its first trip to the state final. Schalick lost, however, 66–69 in overtime to Science Park High School. In the loss, he scored 34 points on 8-for-18 shooting on three-point attempts. For the season, Gause averaged 33.9 points, 6.7 rebounds, 5.2 assists and 3.7 steals per game.

Paul finished his high school career near the top of New Jersey's all-time scoring list. His 3,144 career points rank third in state history and second in South Jersey history. Only Camden High School's Dajuan Wagner, who also owns the state record of 3,462 points, finished with more. Additionally, Gause and Wagner are the only two South Jersey players to ever score 1,000+ points in a single season.

He was named as an All-State selection by New Jersey State Interscholastic Athletic Association, and also the consensus South Jersey Male Athlete of the Year by the Philadelphia Inquirer, Camden Courier-Post and the Vineland Daily Journal.

=== Other sports ===
Gause excelled at other sports besides basketball. An all-state cornerback and running back in football, he led his high school team to two straight South Jersey Group I championships in 2003 & 2004 (the latter being an undefeated 12–0 season). He drew interest from Rutgers and Ohio State for his quickness and ability to read the opposing quarterbacks, though was never given any offers by the schools. Paul set a South Jersey single season scoring record during his senior year after amassing 236 offensive points, breaking the previous South Jersey mark by 10 points. As of March 2008, this point total ranks fourth all-time in New Jersey history. He also set a South Jersey single season touchdown record, also done in 2004, by reaching the end zone 39 times.

During the springtime, Gause participated in the 100m and 200m dashes, 4x400 relay and the high jump events. He finished in the top 5 in SJ Group I during his junior and senior seasons for the high jump, garnering All-Conference accolades in the process.

== College career ==
Gause played for the Seton Hall Pirates men's basketball team as either the point guard or shooting guard. He made his collegiate debut on November 16, 2005, at Cameron Indoor Stadium when SHU visited the Duke Blue Devils. Gause played 16 minutes, scored three points and grabbed two rebounds in the game. His Big East debut came on January 4, 2006, against St. John's University. Paul scored seven points, snagged four steals and grabbed four rebounds in a 69–61 win. He also hit the game-tying shot at the end of regulation to send the game into overtime.

Gause tied the Seton Hall Pirates' single-game steals record in 2006–07 when he recorded eight steals against St. Mary's on December 2, 2006. He also totaled 90 steals on the year, a new Seton Hall men's basketball single-season record. Gause averaged 3.10 spg which topped Big East play and ranked second nationally. For his on-the-ball defense he was nominated as a candidate for the Big East Defensive Player of the Year, but did not win.

Paul's junior year campaign in 2007–08 was hampered by a broken bone in his right hand, and then cut short by a season-ending knee injury on February 6. Prior to his leave he was averaging a conference-best 2.8 steals per game.

== Professional career ==
=== Football ===
Gause was drafted by the Las Vegas Locomotives of the United Football League on June 18, 2009. He was released before the season began.

=== Basketball ===
In 2010, he signed with USC Freiburg, a professional basketball team in Germany's Pro A. In 28 games played during the 2010–11 season, Gause averaged 15.9 points, 3.8 assists and 2.8 steals per game. His steals average was second in the league. Gause now played for Newcastle Eagles in the BBL. He made his debut on September 20, 2011, in the Eagles 85–63 BBL Trophy win against Glasgow Rocks. He was included in the Week 4 BBL Team of the Week.

==== The Basketball Tournament ====
Paul Gause played for Seton Hall In in the 2018 edition of The Basketball Tournament. In 2 games, he averaged 11.5 points, 5.5 rebounds, and 1.5 steals per game. Hall In reached the second round before falling to the Golden Eagles.

== Personal life ==
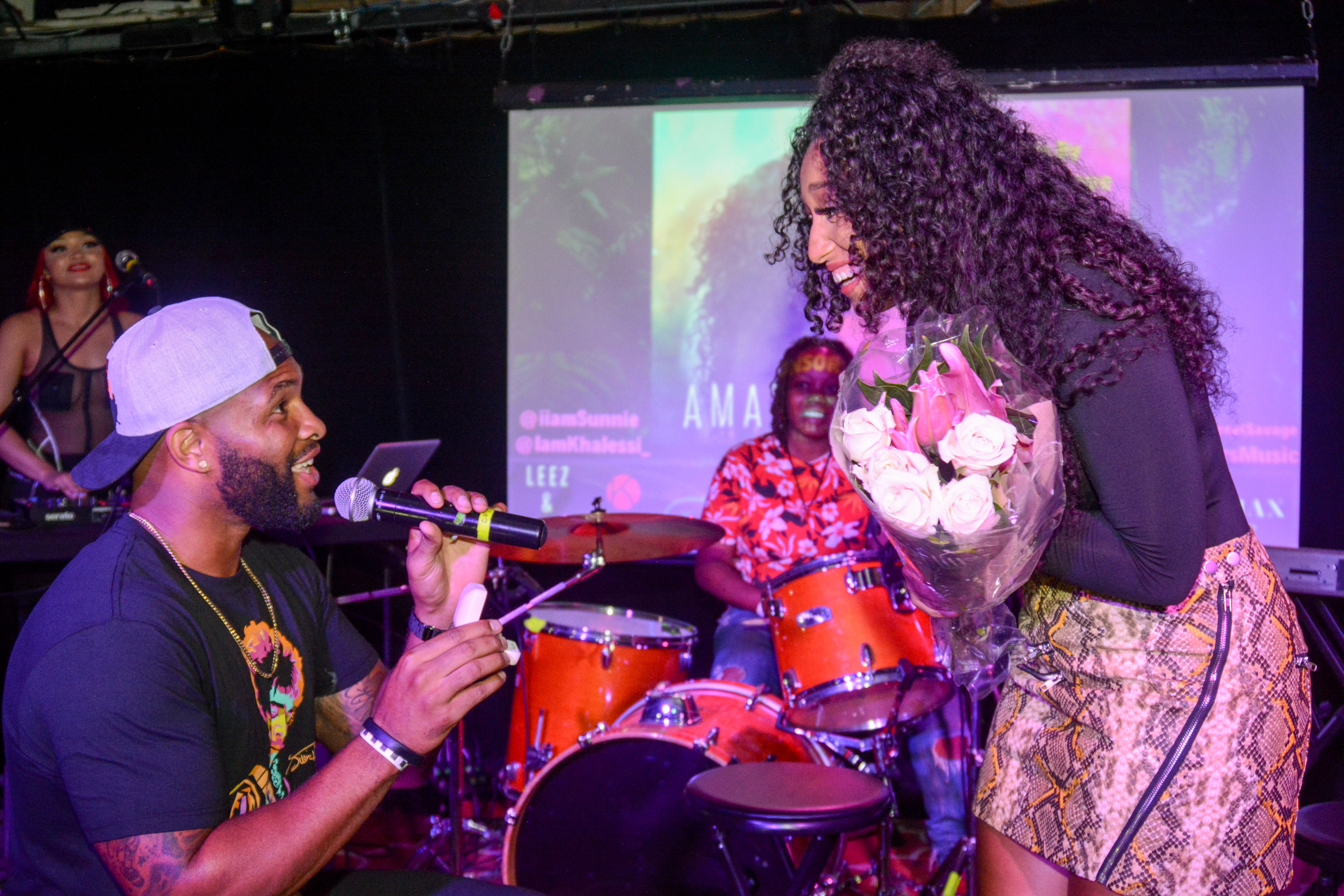
Gause proposing to Bianca Ingram.

Paul Gause is married to Bianca Gause and they have 2 young children.
