= Centreville Township, New Jersey =

Coordinates: 39.538°N 75.113°W

Centreville Township was a township that existed from 1822 to 1829 in Salem County, New Jersey, United States.

The township was incorporated by an Act of the New Jersey Legislature on March 4, 1822, from portions of Pittsgrove Township. On February 8, 1829, the township was dissolved and its territory restored to Pittsgrove Township.
