= David V. Smith House =

Historic house in New Jersey, United States

- U.S. National Register of Historic Places
- New Jersey Register of Historic Places
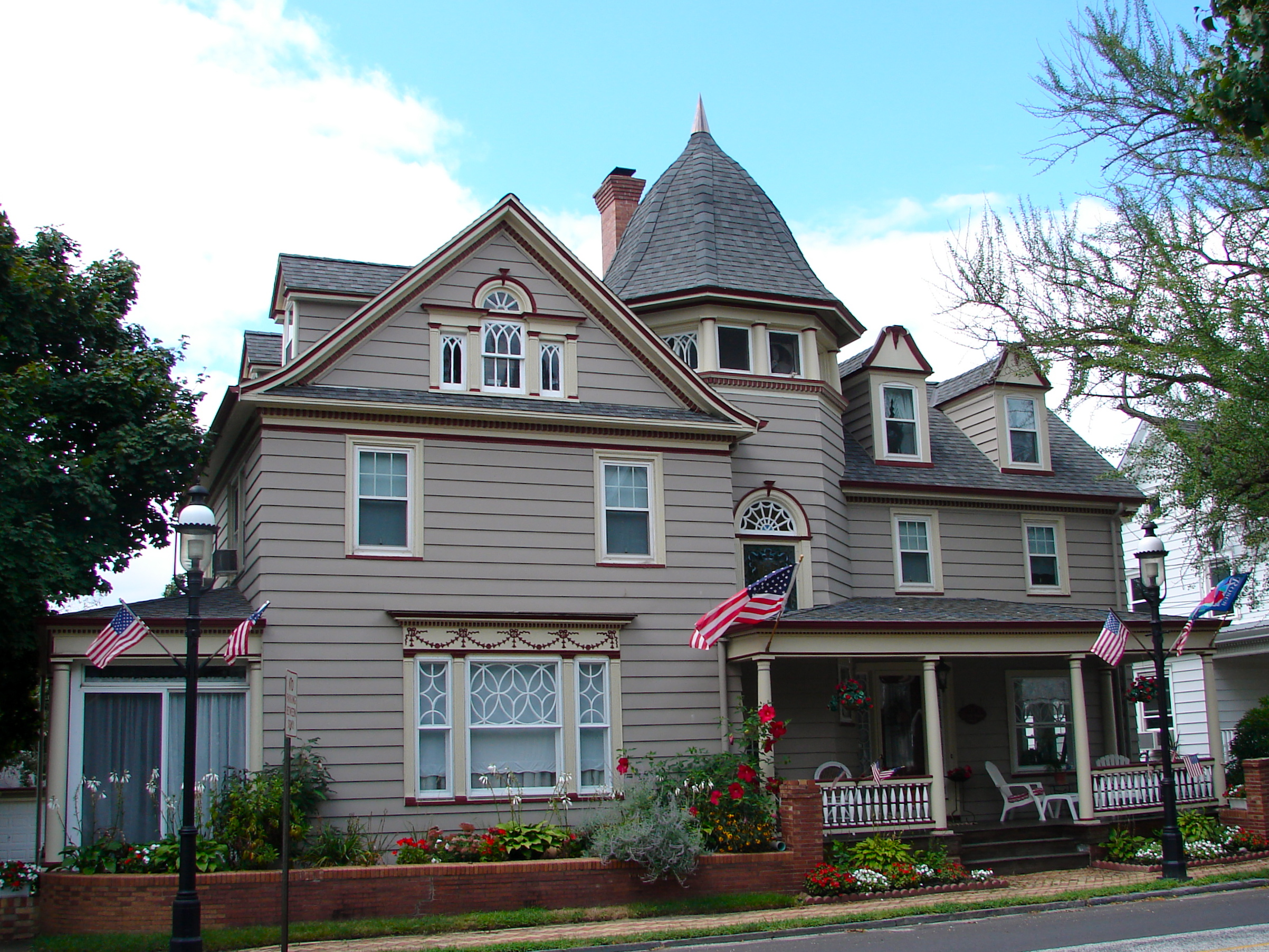

- Location within Salem County, New Jersey Location within New Jersey Location within the United States
- Location: 104 South Main Street, Elmer, New Jersey
- Coordinates: 39°35′36″N 75°10′10″W
- Area: 0.5 acres (0.20 ha)
- Built: 1830
- Architectural style: Late Victorian
- NRHP reference No.: 76001182
- NJRHP No.: 2430

Significant dates
- Added to NRHP: May 17, 1976
- Designated NJRHP: November 20, 1975

David V. Smith House is located in Elmer, Salem County, New Jersey, United States. The house was built in 1830 and was added to the National Register of Historic Places on May 17, 1976.

== See also ==
- National Register of Historic Places listings in Salem County, New Jersey
