= Pittsgrove Township, New Jersey =

Township in Salem County, New Jersey, US

- Township
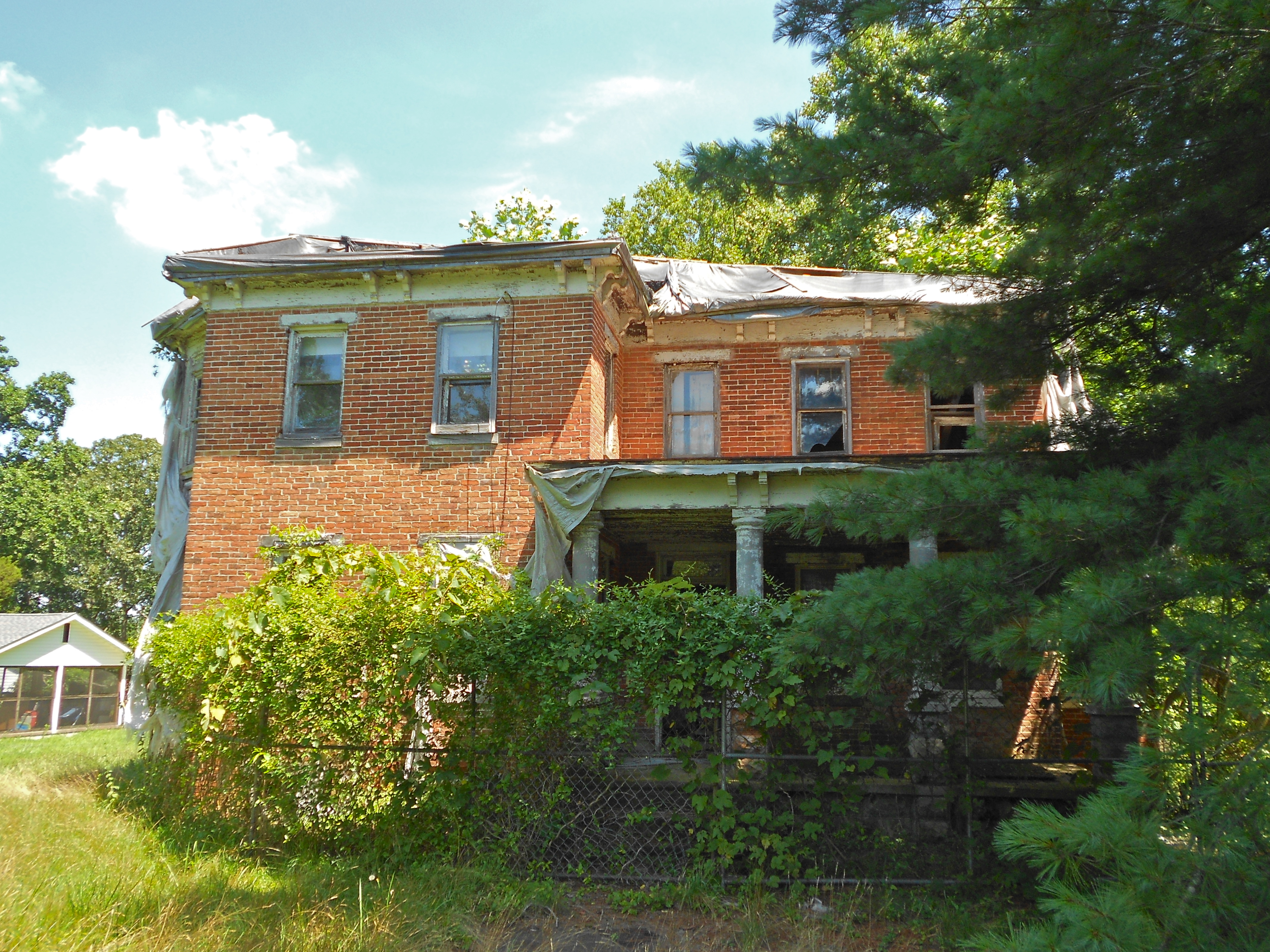
- Moshe Bayuk House

- Seal
- Motto: Old Values, New Ideas: Working Together For All
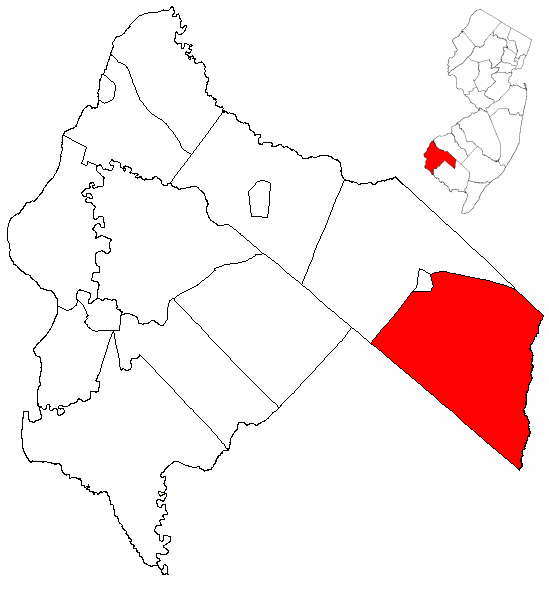
- Pittsgrove Township highlighted in Salem County. Inset map: Salem County highlighted in the State of New Jersey.

- Location in Salem County Location in New Jersey Location in the United States
- Coordinates: 39.54265°N 75.129901°W
- Country: United States
- State: New Jersey
- County: Salem
- Royal charter: December 6, 1769
- Incorporated: February 21, 1798
- Named for: William Pitt, 1st Earl of Chatham

Government
  - Type: Township
  - Body: Township Committee
  - Mayor: Fiore J. Copare (R, term ends December 31, 2023)
  - Administrator: Charles Hughes
  - Municipal clerk: Charlet Cheeseman

Area
  - Total: 45.75 sq mi (118.50 km^{2})
  - Land: 44.90 sq mi (116.29 km^{2})
  - Water: 0.85 sq mi (2.21 km^{2}) 1.87%
  - Rank: 40th of 565 in state 2nd of 15 in county
- Elevation: 108 ft (33 m)

Population (2020)
  - Total: 8,777
  - Estimate (2023): 8,888
  - Rank: 273rd of 565 in state 2nd of 15 in county
  - Density: 195.5/sq mi (75.5/km^{2})
  - Rank: 505th of 565 in state 7th of 15 in county
- Time zone: UTC−05:00 (Eastern (EST))
  - Summer (DST): UTC−04:00 (Eastern (EDT))
- ZIP Code: 08318
- Area code: 856 exchange: 358
- FIPS code: 3403359130
- GNIS feature ID: 1729723
- Website: www.pittsgrovetownship.com

Pittsgrove Township is a township in Salem County, in the U.S. state of New Jersey. As of the 2020 United States census, the township's population was 8,777, a decrease of 616 (−6.6%) from the 2010 census count of 9,393, which in turn reflected an increase of 500 (+5.6%) from the 8,893 counted in the 2000 census.

Pittsgrove Township was formed by Royal charter on December 6, 1769 and was incorporated by an act of the New Jersey Legislature on February 21, 1798, as one of the initial group of 104 townships established in New Jersey. Portions of the township were taken on March 4, 1822, to form Centreville Township (which was restored in 1829 when the township was dissolved), on March 10, 1846, to form Upper Pittsgrove Township and on January 28, 1893, to form Elmer borough. The township was named for William Pitt, 1st Earl of Chatham, a supporter of the colonial cause.

== History ==
The Alliance Colony was a Jewish agricultural community that was founded on May 10, 1882, in Pittsgrove Township. It was named after the Alliance Israélite Universelle of Paris and was funded by the Hebrew Emigrant Aid Society of New York and Philadelphia and the Baron De Hirsch Fund. The Moshe Bayuk House is the last remaining structure at the site of the colony.

== Geography ==
According to the United States Census Bureau, the township had a total area of 45.75 square miles (118.50 km^{2}), including 44.90 square miles (116.29 km^{2}) of land and 0.85 square miles (2.21 km^{2}) of water (1.87%).

Olivet (with a 2020 Census population of 1,297) is an unincorporated community and census-designated place (CDP) located within Pittsgrove Township.

Other unincorporated communities, localities and place names located partially or completely within the township include Alliance, Brotmanville, Centerton, Daretown, Greenville, Norma, Norma Station, Palatine, Parvin Lake, Rainbow Lake, Six Points, Union Grove, Upper Neck and Willow Grove.

The township borders the municipalities of Elmer Borough and Upper Pittsgrove Township in Salem County; Deerfield Township, Upper Deerfield Township and Vineland in Cumberland County and Franklin Township in Gloucester County.

== Demographics ==
Historical population
Census	Pop.	Note	%±
1810	1,991		—
1820	2,040		2.5%
1830	2,216		8.6%
1840	2,390		7.9%
1850	1,151	*	−51.8%
1860	1,233		7.1%
1870	1,667		35.2%
1880	1,433		−14.0%
1890	1,914		33.6%
1900	2,092	*	9.3%
1910	2,394		14.4%
1920	1,842		−23.1%
1930	2,091		13.5%
1940	2,157		3.2%
1950	2,808		30.2%
1960	3,785		34.8%
1970	4,618		22.0%
1980	6,954		50.6%
1990	8,121		16.8%
2000	8,893		9.5%
2010	9,393		5.6%
2020	8,777		−6.6%
2023 (est.)	8,888		1.3%
Population sources: 1810–2000; 1810–1920 1840 1850–1870; 1850 1870 1880–1890; 1890–1910 1910–1930 1940–2000; 2000 2010 2020 * = Lost territory in previous decade.

=== 2010 census ===
The 2010 United States census counted 9,393 people, 3,307 households, and 2,576 families in the township. The population density was 208.3 inhabitants per square mile (80.4/km^{2}). There were 3,445 housing units at an average density of 76.4 per square mile (29.5/km^{2}). The racial makeup was 88.17% (8,282) White, 6.97% (655) Black or African American, 0.42% (39) Native American, 0.94% (88) Asian, 0.01% (1) Pacific Islander, 1.39% (131) from other races, and 2.10% (197) from two or more races. Hispanic or Latino of any race were 4.80% (451) of the population.

Of the 3,307 households, 31.8% had children under the age of 18; 60.1% were married couples living together; 12.4% had a female householder with no husband present and 22.1% were non-families. Of all households, 17.8% were made up of individuals and 7.5% had someone living alone who was 65 years of age or older. The average household size was 2.80 and the average family size was 3.15.

23.3% of the population were under the age of 18, 9.1% from 18 to 24, 22.8% from 25 to 44, 32.3% from 45 to 64, and 12.5% who were 65 years of age or older. The median age was 41.6 years. For every 100 females, the population had 99.0 males. For every 100 females ages 18 and older there were 95.0 males.

The Census Bureau's 2006–2010 American Community Survey showed that (in 2010 inflation-adjusted dollars) median household income was $74,348 (with a margin of error of +/− $6,547) and the median family income was $83,564 (+/− $7,149). Males had a median income of $56,300 (+/− $5,678) versus $38,056 (+/− $6,727) for females. The per capita income for the borough was $28,606 (+/− $1,671). About 2.4% of families and 4.7% of the population were below the poverty line, including 5.0% of those under age 18 and 7.0% of those age 65 or over.

=== 2000 census ===
As of the 2000 United States census there were 8,893 people, 3,020 households, and 2,422 families residing in the township. The population density was 196.8 inhabitants per square mile (76.0/km^{2}). There were 3,155 housing units at an average density of 69.8 per square mile (26.9/km^{2}). The racial makeup of the township was 88.14% White, 8.04% African American, 0.38% Native American, 0.58% Asian, 0.04% Pacific Islander, 1.29% from other races, and 1.52% from two or more races. Hispanic or Latino of any race were 3.41% of the population.

There were 3,020 households, out of which 38.1% had children under the age of 18 living with them, 64.9% were married couples living together, 10.7% had a female householder with no husband present, and 19.8% were non-families. 16.2% of all households were made up of individuals, and 6.2% had someone living alone who was 65 years of age or older. The average household size was 2.90 and the average family size was 3.23.

In the township the population was spread out, with 26.7% under the age of 18, 8.0% from 18 to 24, 27.8% from 25 to 44, 26.1% from 45 to 64, and 11.4% who were 65 years of age or older. The median age was 38 years. For every 100 females, there were 98.1 males. For every 100 females age 18 and over, there were 93.4 males.

The median income for a household in the township was $56,687, and the median income for a family was $63,266. Males had a median income of $42,653 versus $27,173 for females. The per capita income for the township was $21,624. About 3.5% of families and 5.0% of the population were below the poverty line, including 6.8% of those under age 18 and 4.1% of those age 65 or over.

== Government ==
=== Local government ===
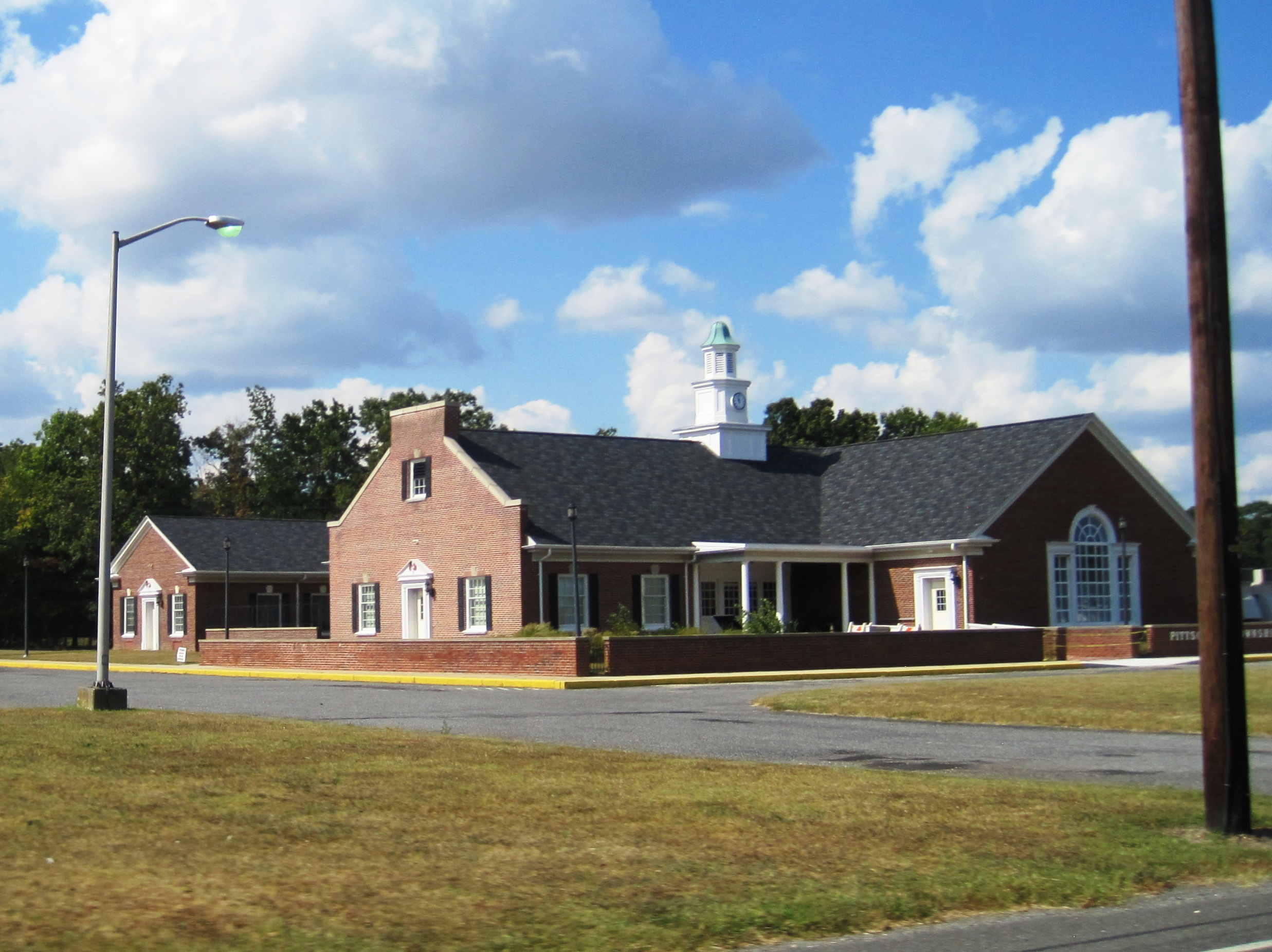
Municipal Building

Pittsgrove Township is governed under the Township form of New Jersey municipal government, one of 141 municipalities (of the 564) statewide that use this form, the second-most commonly used form of government in the state. The Township Committee is comprised of five members, who are elected directly by the voters at-large in partisan elections to serve three-year terms of office on a staggered basis, with either one or two seats coming up for election each year as part of the November general election in a three-year cycle. At an annual reorganization meeting, the Township Committee selects one of its members to serve as Mayor and another as Deputy Mayor.

As of 2022, members of the Pittsgrove Township Committee are Mayor Fiore Copare (R, term on committee ends December 31, 2023; term as mayor ends 2022), Deputy Mayor Francesca I. Spinelli (R, term on committee ends 2024; term as deputy mayor ends 2022), Eric Harz (R, 2022), William A. Schmidt (R, 2023) and Kevin Yeagle (R, 2024).

==== Public safety ====
Pittsgrove Township is protected by the New Jersey State Police. American Legion Ambulance Corps (who purchased the Elmer Ambulance Corps in 2018) and Norma/Alliance Rescue provide EMS services to the township. Centerton Fire Company, Willow Grove Fire Company, and Norma/Alliance Fire Rescue provide fire protection services for the township.

=== Federal, state and county representation ===
Pittsgrove Township is located in the 2nd Congressional District and is part of New Jersey's 3rd state legislative district.

For the 119th United States Congress, New Jersey's 2nd congressional district is represented by Jeff Van Drew (R, Dennis Township). New Jersey is represented in the United States Senate by Democrats Cory Booker (Newark, term ends 2027) and Andy Kim (Moorestown, term ends 2031).

For the 2026–2027 session, the 3rd legislative district of the New Jersey Legislature is represented in the State Senate by John Burzichelli (D, Paulsboro) and in the General Assembly by David Bailey (D, Woodstown) and Heather Simmons (D, Glassboro).

Salem County is governed by a five-member Board of County Commissioners who are elected at-large to serve three-year terms of office on a staggered basis, with either one or two seats coming up for election each year. At an annual reorganization meeting held in the beginning of January, the board selects a Director and a Deputy Director from among its members. As of 2025, Salem County's Commissioners (with party, residence, and term-end year listed in parentheses) are:

Director Benjamin H. Laury (R, Elmer, 2027), Deputy Director Cordy Taylor (R, Oldmans Township, 2028), Paul Collier (R, Lower Alloways Creek, 2027), Ed Ramsey (R, Pittsgrove Township, 2026), and Daniel Timmerman (R, Elmer, 2028).

Constitutional officers elected on a countywide basis are: Clerk Dale A. Cross (R, Pennsville Township, 2029), Sheriff Charles M. Miller (R, Salem, 2027) and Surrogate Gordon J. Ostrum Jr. (R, Pilesgrove Township, 2030).

=== Politics ===
Gubernatorial election results for Pittsgrove Township
Year	Republican		Democratic		Third party(ies)	
Year	No.	%	No.	%	No.	%
2025	2,296	60.98%	1,449	38.49%	20	0.53%
2021	2,022	65.78%	1,036	33.70%	16	0.52%
2017	1,257	49.16%	1,191	46.58%	109	4.26%
2013	1,764	63.98%	926	33.59%	67	2.43%
2009	1,422	48.93%	1,198	41.23%	286	9.84%
2005	1,296	46.60%	1,330	47.82%	155	5.57%

United States presidential election results for Pittsgrove Township 2024 2020 2016 2012 2008 2004
Year	Republican		Democratic		Third party(ies)	
Year	No.	%	No.	%	No.	%
2024	3,069	63.21%	1,715	35.32%	71	1.46%
2020	3,011	58.95%	2,006	39.27%	91	1.78%
2016	2,508	58.08%	1,655	38.33%	155	3.59%
2012	2,114	50.25%	2,046	48.63%	47	1.12%
2008	2,162	47.92%	2,279	50.51%	71	1.57%
2004	2,233	51.22%	2,077	47.64%	50	1.15%

United States Senate election results for Pittsgrove Township1
Year	Republican		Democratic		Third party(ies)	
Year	No.	%	No.	%	No.	%
2024	2,932	61.20%	1,738	36.28%	121	2.53%
2018	1,970	57.35%	1,297	37.76%	168	4.89%
2012	1,868	45.67%	2,061	50.39%	161	3.94%
2006	1,437	49.08%	1,344	45.90%	147	5.02%

United States Senate election results for Pittsgrove Township2
Year	Republican		Democratic		Third party(ies)	
Year	No.	%	No.	%	No.	%
2020	2,913	57.90%	1,977	39.30%	141	2.80%
2014	1,303	52.88%	1,082	43.91%	79	3.21%
2013	840	57.57%	601	41.19%	18	1.23%
2008	1,922	43.85%	2,254	51.43%	207	4.72%

As of March 2011, there were a total of 5,928 registered voters in Pittsgrove Township, of which 1,618 (27.3% vs. 30.6% countywide) were registered as Democrats, 1,223 (20.6% vs. 21.0%) were registered as Republicans and 3,085 (52.0% vs. 48.4%) were registered as Unaffiliated. There were 2 voters registered as either Libertarians or Greens. Among the township's 2010 Census population, 63.1% (vs. 64.6% in Salem County) were registered to vote, including 82.3% of those ages 18 and over (vs. 84.4% countywide).

In the 2016 presidential election, Republican Donald Trump received 58% of the vote (2,508 cast), ahead of Democrat Hillary Clinton with 38.3% (1,655 votes), and other candidates with 3.6% (155 votes), among the 4,318 ballots cast in total. In the 2012 presidential election, Republican Mitt Romney received 50.2% of the vote (2,114 cast), ahead of Democrat Barack Obama with 48.6% (2,046 votes), and other candidates with 1.1% (47 votes), among the 4,229 ballots cast by the township's 6,130 registered voters (22 ballots were spoiled), for a turnout of 69.0%. In the 2008 presidential election, Democrat Barack Obama received 2,279 votes (50.0% vs. 50.4% countywide), ahead of Republican John McCain with 2,162 votes (47.5% vs. 46.6%) and other candidates with 71 votes (1.6% vs. 1.6%), among the 4,554 ballots cast by the township's 6,225 registered voters, for a turnout of 73.2% (vs. 71.8% in Salem County). In the 2004 presidential election, Republican George W. Bush received 2,233 votes (51.0% vs. 52.5% countywide), ahead of Democrat John Kerry with 2,077 votes (47.4% vs. 45.9%) and other candidates with 50 votes (1.1% vs. 1.0%), among the 4,380 ballots cast by the township's 6,022 registered voters, for a turnout of 72.7% (vs. 71.0% in the whole county).

In the 2013 gubernatorial election, Republican Chris Christie received 64.0% of the vote (1,764 cast), ahead of Democrat Barbara Buono with 33.6% (926 votes), and other candidates with 2.4% (67 votes), among the 2,908 ballots cast by the township's 6,077 registered voters (151 ballots were spoiled), for a turnout of 47.9%. In the 2009 gubernatorial election, Republican Chris Christie received 1,422 votes (46.9% vs. 46.1% countywide), ahead of Democrat Jon Corzine with 1,198 votes (39.5% vs. 39.9%), Independent Chris Daggett with 243 votes (8.0% vs. 9.7%) and other candidates with 43 votes (1.4% vs. 2.0%), among the 3,035 ballots cast by the township's 6,164 registered voters, yielding a 49.2% turnout (vs. 47.3% in the county).

== Education ==
Public school students from Pittsgrove Township and Elmer borough attend the Pittsgrove Township School District for kindergarten through twelfth grade as part of a full sending/receiving relationship in which the former Elmer School was integrated into the district as of 2011 and students from both Elmer and Pittsgrove Township attend school together throughout their education. Initially this was done as part of a full sending/receiving relationship from Elmer to Pittsgrove Township. The Elmer School District fully dissolved after the 2016–17 school year and was absorbed by the Pittsgrove Township district, which paid $620,000 to acquire the Elmer School facility.

As of the 2023–24 school year, the district, comprised of five schools, had an enrollment of 1,680 students and 142.9 classroom teachers (on an FTE basis), for a student–teacher ratio of 11.8:1. Schools in the district (with 2023–24 enrollment data from the National Center for Education Statistics) are Norma Elementary School with 131 students in grades PreK–K, Elmer Elementary School with 197 students in grades 1–2, Olivet Elementary School with 351 students in grades 3–5, Pittsgrove Township Middle School with 483 students in grades 6–8 and A.P. Schalick High School with 478 students in grades 9–12.

== Transportation ==
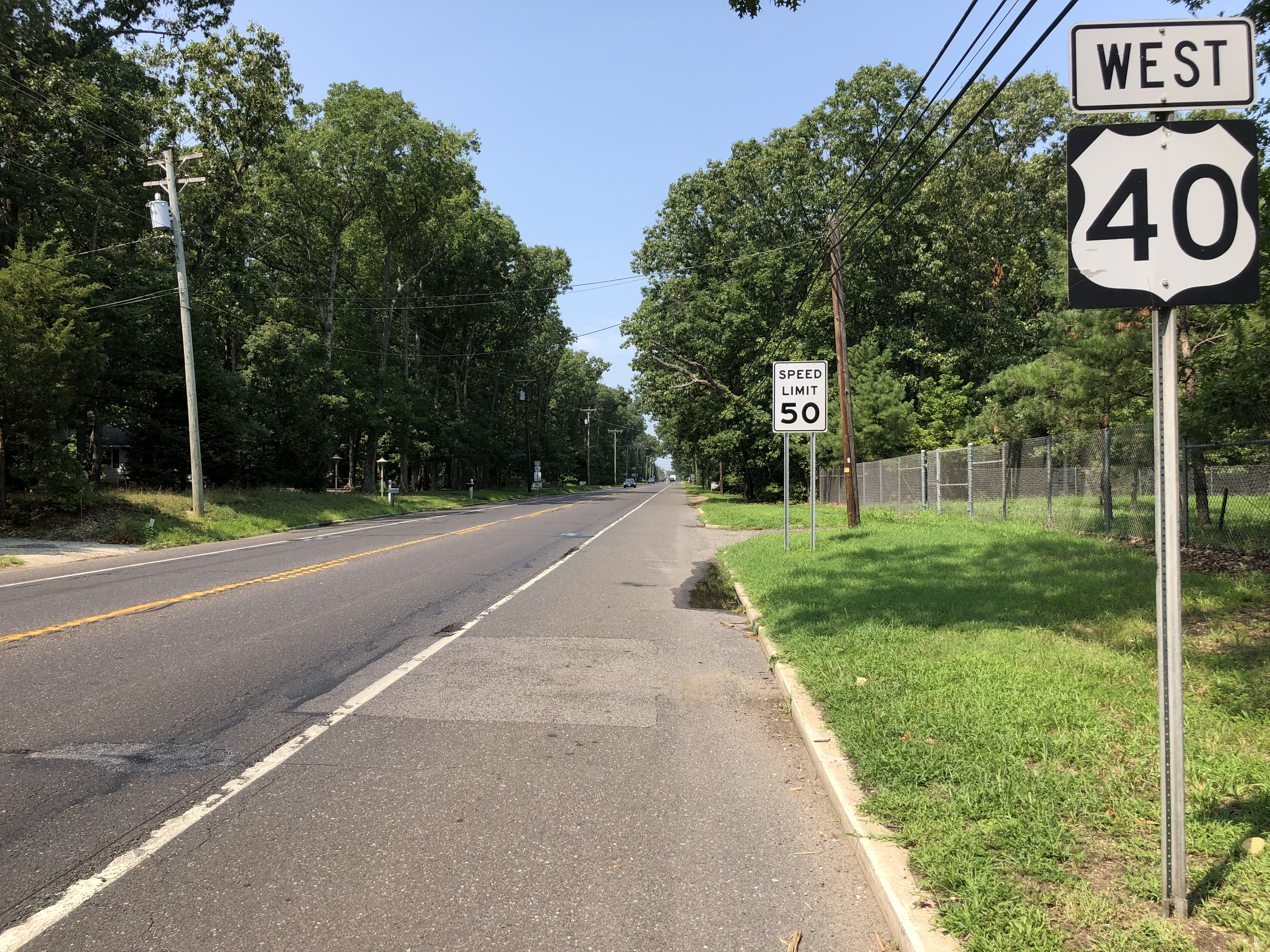
U.S. Route 40 westbound on the border of Pittsgrove Township and Upper Pittsgrove Township

As of May 2010, the township had a total of 125.38 miles (201.78 km) of roadways, the highest in the county, of which 57.54 miles (92.60 km) were maintained by the municipality, 64.99 miles (104.59 km) by Salem County and 2.85 miles (4.59 km) by the New Jersey Department of Transportation.

U.S. Route 40 is the most prominent highway serving Pittsgrove Township, crossing east–west along the northern edge of the township. Other significant roads within the township include Route 56, which passes through the southern part of the township, while a small portion of Route 55 passes through the eastern part of the township County highways include County Route 540, which passes east / west through the township, intersecting and briefly overlapping with County Route 553, which crosses in a north / south direction.

== Notable people ==
People who were born in, residents of, or otherwise closely associated with Pittsgrove Township include:

- Stanley Brotman (1924–2014), Judge of the United States District Court for the District of New Jersey
- Jack Collins (born 1943), former Speaker of the New Jersey General Assembly
- Paul Gause (born 1986), professional basketball player for the Newcastle Eagles in the British Basketball League
- Michael Iaconelli (born 1972), professional bass fisherman, winner of 2003 Bassmaster Classic
- Kevin Jackson (born 1978), former U.S. soccer midfielder who spent five seasons in the USL First Division and two in the Premier Development League
- Jamarr Andre Johnson (born 1988), professional basketball player for CLS Knights Surabaya in Indonesia
- Matthew Newkirk (1794-1868), railroad executive
- Joseph B. Perskie (1885–1957), Associate Justice of the New Jersey Supreme Court from 1933 to 1947
- Thomas Whitaker Trenchard (1863–1942), lawyer and a Justice of the New Jersey Supreme Court between 1906 and 1941, who was presiding judge in the Lindbergh kidnapping trial of Richard Hauptmann
