= Melissa Helmbrecht =

American social entrepreneur and advocate (born 1975)

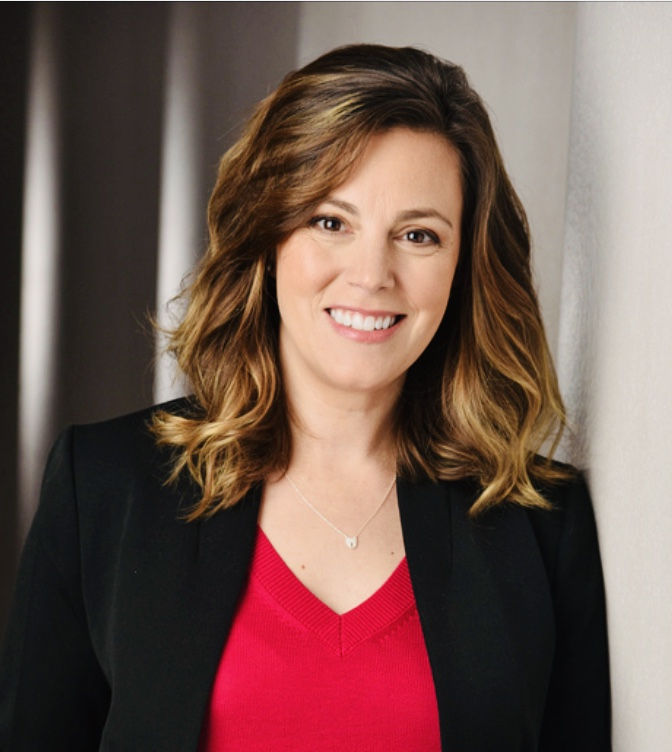
- Helmbrecht in 2021
- Born: c. 1975 (age 50–51); Wilmington, Delaware
- Education: American University; University of Denver Law School
- Occupations: Entrepreneur, youth activist
- Spouse(s): Walter J. Kappeler, Jr.
- Children: 2

Melissa Helmbrecht (born 1975 in Wilmington, Delaware) is an American nonprofit executive who has founded youth service organizations.

== Biography ==
Helmbrecht attended Arthur P. Schalick High School in New Jersey before moving to Florida. As a high school senior, she created Youth CAN, a youth service organization affiliated with the Caring Institute.

In 1991, Helmbrecht was appointed to the Orlando Leadership Council, where she promoted youth service. She also participated in a design council for The Walt Disney Company's model town of Celebration, Florida.

That same year, President George H.W. Bush designated Orlando as "America's First City of Light," a pilot project of the Points of Light Foundation aimed at increasing volunteerism. Helmbrecht was appointed to the business leadership council, youth leadership council, and the executive board of the City of Light, where she launched a program called Schools of Light to integrate volunteer services into area schools.

Helmbrecht graduated from American University in Washington, D.C. in 1998 and the University of Denver College of Law in 2001, where she studied child advocacy law. While at the University of Denver Law School, Helmbrecht served as the 15th Circuit Governor for the American Bar Association Law Student Division and as a member of the ABA Committee on the Unmet Legal Needs of Children. In 2000, Helmbrecht was a speaker at the National Association of Independent Schools conference. She also served as a Guardian Ad Litem for abused and neglected children in court while studying at the Rocky Mountain Children's Law Center. As president of the Children's Millennium Movement, Helmbrecht was recognized by the American Bar Association in 2001 for her efforts in addressing the needs of foster children.

Following the Columbine High School Massacre and the September 11th terrorist attacks, Helmbrecht founded the Youth Investment Project with a grant from Youth Service America. The project was a mentoring program for middle school students in Denver, Colorado, to encourage participation in peer mediation and conflict resolution activities. The project included a "Day of Hope" on the first anniversary of the Columbine High School massacre that featured two surviving students, with 10,000 young people participating in volunteer service projects.

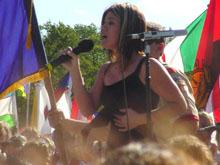
Kelly Clarkson singing at the first United Day of Service on September 11, 2002.

In 2000, Helmbrecht founded Champions of Hope. Her organization, along with Youth Service America, founded the United Day of Service to promote youth-led service learning projects. Over three million volunteers from the U.S. and 150 other countries participated in the United Day of Service, with approximately 650,000 youth registered to organize and participate in service projects. The Verizon Foundation sponsored the activities. Helmbrecht secured Kelly Clarkson's participation in the first celebration of the United Day of Service on September 11, 2002, at the National Mall, alongside actor Sean Astin and former U.S. Senator Harris Wofford. That year, she served on the White House's "Youth Service Compact," a committee of nonprofit groups that formulated a strategy to increase the impact of youth service organizations.

In 2008, Helmbrecht served on the Global Ambassadors Committee of Airline Ambassadors International, a project organized by travel commentator Peter Greenberg, the travel editor of NBC's Today Show. In June 2008, she was among the signers of the Youth Entitlements Summit Declaration.

In 2007, Helmbrecht founded Splash life, Inc., an online social networking platform for youth activism. On March 19, 2009, Whoopi Goldberg mentioned Splash life on The View talk show. Through Splash life, Helmbrecht organized youth-led mobilizations focused on social issues. In 2011, the company partnered with Team Rubicon to launch a national "Rebuilding from Devastation" campaign to support disaster relief efforts in the Southern and Midwest U.S. Splash life also launched Generation Innovation, an initiative designed to support and reward young entrepreneurs, as a part of the White House Youth Entrepreneur Summit.

Helmbrecht is the founder and CEO of Hopeloft, a nonprofit charity based in New Jersey that provides community services including one-on-one family advocacy and support, trauma-informed work, and educational opportunities, as well as life skills classes.

== Political career ==
Helmbrecht ran unsuccessfully for the U.S. House of Representatives in Virginia's Eighth Congressional District in 2003 as a Republican candidate with a campaign focused on education reform, youth empowerment, and improving community services. Lisa Marie Cheney secured the nomination in her stead at the district Republican convention.

== Awards and recognition ==
Helmbrecht has received the following awards:

- The White House Building Healthy Communities and Healthy Youth Award
- The CBS Everyday Hero Award
- The Walt Disney World Dreamers and Doers Award
- The National Caring Award

She was also inducted into the Frederick Douglass Museum and Hall of Fame for Caring Americans. She was recognized by Youth Service America for her social entrepreneurship and youth advocacy efforts.
