= Arthur P. Schalick High School =

High school in Salem County, New Jersey, US

Location
- 718 Centerton Road; Pittsgrove Township, Salem County, New Jersey 08318; United States; 39.528756°N 75.165667°W

Information
- Type: Public high school
- Motto: P.R.I.D.E.: Patience, Respect, Integrity, Diligence, Empathy.
- Established: September 1976
- NCES School ID: 341311005080
- Principal: Amanda Gaunt-Merollo
- Faculty: 42.5 FTEs
- Enrollment: 482 (as of 2024–25)
- Student to teacher ratio: 11.3:1
- Colors: Dark Green gold and white
- Athletics conference: Tri-County Conference
- Team name: Cougars
- Yearbook: Horizon
- Website: schalick.pittsgrove.net

Arthur P. Schalick High School is a comprehensive community four-year public high school that serves students in ninth through twelfth grade from Pittsgrove Township, in Salem County, in the U.S. state of New Jersey, operating as the lone secondary school of the Pittsgrove Township School District.

As of the 2024–25 school year, the school had an enrollment of 482 students and 42.5 classroom teachers (on an FTE basis), for a student–teacher ratio of 11.3:1. There were 137 students (28.4% of enrollment) eligible for free lunch and 34 (7.1% of students) eligible for reduced-cost lunch.

== History ==
Opened in September 1976 and constructed at a cost of $4 million (equivalent to $22.6 million in 2025), the school was built to serve an enrollment of 650 in grades 7–11 at opening and was named for Arthur P. Schalick, who at the age of 85 had been serving for 25 years as the board's president. Before the new high school was completed, students from Pittsgrove Township would be sent to attend either Bridgeton High School or Vineland High School as part of sending/receiving relationships, but both schools were above their capacity and could no longer accommodate students from Pittsgrove Township.

In 1977, a group of parents protested to the district's board of education about profanity in the book The Catcher in the Rye, which had been included as a text in an elective course. While many board members were unfamiliar with the book, consensus was that the decision on the matter would be heavily influenced by 85-year-old Arthur P. Schalick, whose power was emphasized by the school's principal, who said that "[Schalick] is the township".

== Awards, recognition and rankings ==
The school was the 175th-ranked public high school in New Jersey out of 339 schools statewide in New Jersey Monthly magazine's September 2014 cover story on the state's "Top Public High Schools", using a new ranking methodology. The school had been ranked 209th in the state of 328 schools in 2012, after being ranked 168th in 2010 out of 322 schools listed. The magazine ranked the school 207th in 2008 out of 316 schools. The school was ranked 211th in the magazine's September 2006 issue, which surveyed 316 schools across the state.

== Academic programs ==
Under the terms of an articulation agreement reached in 2014 between the high school and Rowan University, participants in the school's Creative and Performing Arts Academy will be able to apply up to six college credits at Rowan using coursework performed at the high school.

== Athletics ==
The A. P. Schalick High School Cougars compete as one of the member schools in the Tri-County Conference, which is comprised of public and private high schools in Camden, Cape May, Cumberland, Gloucester and Salem counties. The conference is overseen by the New Jersey State Interscholastic Athletic Association (NJSIAA). With 378 students in grades 10-12, the school was classified by the NJSIAA for the 2022–24 school years as Group I South for most athletic competition purposes. The football team competes in the Horizon Division of the 94-team West Jersey Football League superconference and was classified by the NJSIAA as Group I South for football for 2022–2024, which included schools with 185 to 482 students.

The softball team won the Group I state championship in 1978, finishing the season with no losses after defeating Cedar Grove High School by a score of 8–2 in the final round of the tournament at Mercer County Park.

The girls' basketball team won the Group I state championship in 1984, defeating Wallkill Valley Regional High School by a score of 54–52 in the final game of the playoff tournament to become the first South Jersey public school to win in the group.

The boys' baseball team won South Jersey Group I sectional title, the first for any boys' program in school history, with a 4-3 win against Audubon High School in the tournament championship game.

The boys soccer team was the Group I state champion in 2001 (as co-champion with Whippany Park High School) and 2004 (defeating North Warren Regional High School in the tournament final). The team won the 1994, 1995, 2001, 2002, 2003, 2004, 2007 and 2015 South Jersey Group I state sectional championships with wins over Haddon Heights (in 2001 and 2002), Clayton (in 2003), Woodbury (in 2004), Point Pleasant Beach (in 2007) and Lindenwold High Schools (in 2015). In 2004, the team went on to win the Group I state championship with a pair of 2-1 wins over Bound Brook in the semi-finals and North Warren in the finals. They reached the finals again in 2015 but were defeated 1-0 by David Brearley High School. They would make the state finals once again in 2026 and will face Glen Ridge in the final.

The football team took the South Jersey Group I state sectional titles in 2003 and 2004. The team won the 2003 title, topping Woodbury Junior-Senior High School by a final score of 21-6 and then by a 20–6 win over Paulsboro High School the following year to finish the season with a 12–0 record. They would win the 2026 South Jersey Group I title after beating Pennsville in the final 35-6.

The girls' soccer team won the South Jersey Group I championship with a 2–1 victory versus Riverside High School in 2003, followed by a victory over Pennsville in 2004 for consecutive championships.

The boys' basketball team won the 2005 South, Group I state sectional championship, edging Burlington City High School 74–72 in the tournament final. The team took the first round of the 2005 Group I state championships with a 72–55 win over Florence Memorial High School, but fell in the finals to Science Park High School 69–66 in overtime.

The girls' field hockey team won the South Jersey Group I state sectional championships in 2009, 2011 (as state group runner-up) and 2017. The program's first title came in 2009 with a 1–0 overtime victory against St. Joseph High School.

The boys' tennis team won the South Jersey Group I state sectional championships in 1995 and 1996, defeating Pitman High School both years in the tournament championship and were also the New Jersey Group I state runners-up in both of those years as well. The 1995 and 1996 boys' tennis teams were the first back-to-back South Jersey sectional champions and back-to-back New Jersey state runners-up in school history. The 1996 Boys Tennis Team was inducted into the Schalick High School Sports Hall of Fame in 2025.

== Administration ==
The school's principal is Amanda Gaunt-Merollo. Her administration team includes the assistant principal and athletic director.

== Notable alumni ==
- Paul Gause (born 1986), class of 2005, one of only three male players in New Jersey prep basketball history to score 3,000 points in a career
- Melissa Helmbrecht (born 1975), social entrepreneur
- Kevin Jackson (born 1978), former U.S. soccer midfielder who spent five seasons in the USL First Division and two in the Premier Development League
- Jamarr Johnson (born 1988), professional basketball player who played for Prawira Bandung
- Joe Pyfer (born 1996), professional mixed martial artist who competes in the middleweight division in the Ultimate Fighting Championship
- Jesse Ridgway (born 1992, class of 2010), Youtuber, filmmaker and actor
