= Brotmanville, New Jersey =

Populated place in Salem County, New Jersey, US

- Unincorporated community
- Brotmanville's location in Salem County (Inset: Salem County in New Jersey) Brotmanville, New Jersey (New Jersey) Brotmanville, New Jersey (the United States)
- Coordinates: 39°31′14″N 75°04′57″W
- Country: United States
- State: New Jersey
- County: Salem
- Township: Pittsgrove
- Elevation: 72 ft (22 m)
- Time zone: UTC−05:00 (Eastern (EST))
  - Summer (DST): UTC−04:00 (EDT)
- Area code: 856
- GNIS feature ID: 874976

Brotmanville is an unincorporated community located within Pittsgrove Township, in Salem County, in the U.S. state of New Jersey. The area is accessible via exit 35 on Route 55. The community of Brotmanville was originally a Jewish settlement and is currently a predominantly African-American neighborhood.

== Notable people ==
People who were born in, residents of, or otherwise closely associated with Brotmanville include:

- Stanley Brotman (1924–2014), Judge of the United States District Court for the District of New Jersey.
