= Pittsgrove Township School District =

School district in Salem County, New Jersey, US

Address
- 1076 Almond Road Pittsgrove Township, Salem County, New Jersey, 08318; United States
- Coordinates: 39.556451°N 75.151895°W

District information
- Grades: PreK-12
- Superintendent: Yvette BuBois Trembley
- Business administrator: Darren Harris
- Schools: 5

Students and staff
- Enrollment: 1,680 (as of 2023–24)
- Faculty: 142.9 FTEs
- Student–teacher ratio: 11.8:1

Other information
- District Factor Group: CD
- Website: www.pittsgrove.net
Ind.	Per pupil	District spending	Rank (*)	K-12 average	%± vs. average
1A	Total Spending	$17,351	19	$18,891	−8.2%
1	Budgetary Cost	12,698	11	14,783	−14.1%
2	Classroom Instruction	6,818	6	8,763	−22.2%
6	Support Services	2,085	29	2,392	−12.8%
8	Administrative Cost	1,700	28	1,485	14.5%
10	Operations & Maintenance	1,641	31	1,783	−8.0%
13	Extracurricular Activities	282	4	268	5.2%
16	Median Teacher Salary	61,550	27	64,043
Data from NJDoE 2014 Taxpayers' Guide to Education Spending. *Of K-12 districts with up to 1,800 students. Lowest spending=1; Highest=49

The Pittsgrove Township School District is a comprehensive community public school district that serves students in pre-kindergarten through twelfth grade from Pittsgrove Township and Elmer borough, in Salem County, in the U.S. state of New Jersey.

As of the 2023–24 school year, the district, comprised of five schools, had an enrollment of 1,680 students and 142.9 classroom teachers (on an FTE basis), for a student–teacher ratio of 11.8:1.

Elmer and Pittsgrove Township students attend school together throughout their education. Initially this was done as part of a full sending/receiving relationship from Elmer to Pittsgrove Township. The Elmer School District fully dissolved after the 2016–17 school year and was absorbed by the Pittsgrove Township district, which paid $620,000 to acquire the Elmer School facility.

The district had been classified by the New Jersey Department of Education as being in District Factor Group "CD", the sixth-highest of eight groupings. District Factor Groups organize districts statewide to allow comparison by common socioeconomic characteristics of the local districts. From lowest socioeconomic status to highest, the categories are A, B, CD, DE, FG, GH, I and J.

== Schools ==
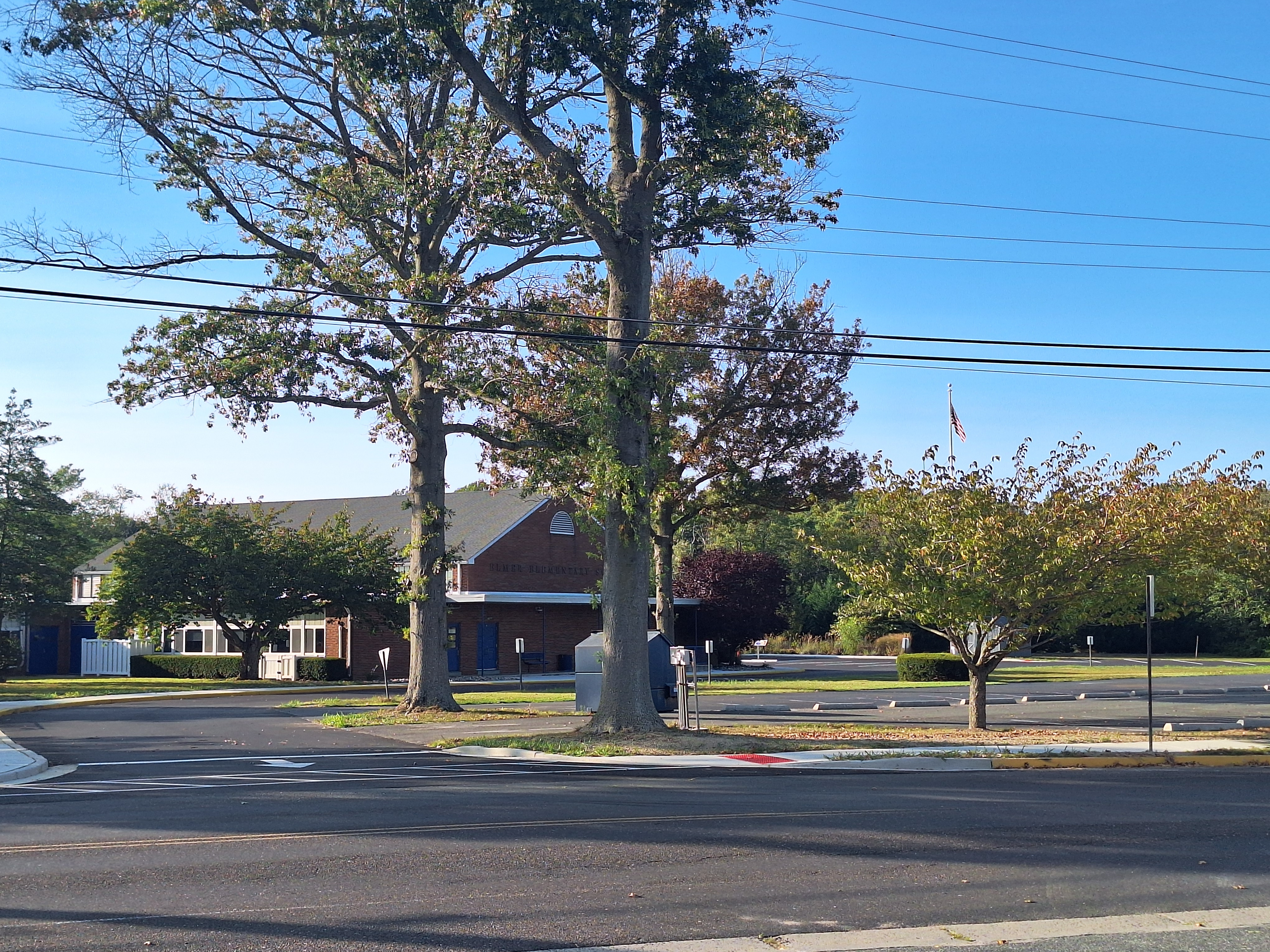
Elmer Elementary School in Elmer

Schools in the district (with 2023–24 enrollment data from the National Center for Education Statistics) are:

Elementary schools

- Norma Elementary School with 131 students in grades PreK–K
  - Nicholas Carpo, principal
- Elmer Elementary School with 197 students in grades 1–2
  - Daniel F. Bruce, principal
- Olivet Elementary School with 351 students in grades 3–5
  - Tino Monti, principal

Middle school

- Pittsgrove Township Middle School with 483 students in grades 6–8
  - Rory Nordberg, principal

High school

- A.P. Schalick High School with 478 students in grades 9–12
  - Amanda Gaunt-Merollo, principal

== Administration ==
Core members of the district's administration are:

- Yvette DuBois Trembley, superintendent
- Darren Harris, business administrator and board secretary

== Board of education ==
The district's board of education, comprised of nine members, sets policy and oversees the fiscal and educational operation of the district through its administration. As a Type II school district, the board's trustees are elected directly by voters to serve three-year terms of office on a staggered basis, with three seats up for election each year held (since 2012) as part of the November general election. The board appoints a superintendent to oversee the district's day-to-day operations and a business administrator to supervise the business functions of the district. One additional member is appointed to represent the Elmer sending district.
