= Sinnickson =

Sinnickson may refer to:

People:

- Clement Hall Sinnickson (1834–1919), American Republican Party politician
- Thomas Sinnickson (jurist) (1786–1873), American jurist and statesman from Salem, New Jersey
- Thomas Sinnickson (merchant) (1744–1817), American merchant and statesman from Salem, New Jersey

Geography:

- Sinnickson, Virginia, unincorporated community in Accomack County, Virginia
