= George Washington Nicholson =

American artist

George Washington Nicholson (1832–1912) was an American artist best known for his landscape portraits.

Born near Salem, New Jersey and raised in Mannington Township, New Jersey, Nicholson worked painting homes and began painting pictures with the encouragement of his sister.

He lived in Philadelphia and married Jane Elizabeth Bray, who died shortly after their only son was born. Nicholson taught art, largely giving private lessons. After studies at the Pennsylvania Academy of the Fine Arts, Nicholson spent years travelling to Europe and the Middle East, where he continued his studies. He continued private lessons and had works displayed in shows, and at fairs and museums, many of which featured sites that he had seen on his trip to Europe. Some of his works featured sites he had seen in the Middle East. He received commissions for works that included the mural Washington Crossing the Delaware, which was part of the collection at the Pennsylvania State House, until it was destroyed by fire. Wanamaker's department store commissioned Nicholson to paint a 7-by-14-foot (2.1 by 4.3 m) landscape mural, The Old Homestead, which he completed in March 1892 and was on display there until it was sold to a private collection sometime after 1950.

He moved to Hammonton, New Jersey, where he resided with his son and died there in 1912. During his time in Hammonton, he painted many pictures inspired by the places along the Jersey Shore.
