= Barrett's Plantation House =

Coordinates: 39.591884°N 75.454717°W

Barrett's Plantation House is a historic home and bed and breakfast at 203 Old Kings Highway in Mannington Township, New Jersey.

The original portion of the home was built in 1735 which includes a sitting room and dining room on the first floor, two guest rooms — the Dickinson Suite and the Morris Suite—on the second floor and the garret on the third floor. A kitchen was built onto the rear of the original structure in the mid-1800s, then the back section, consisting of a modern kitchen and owner's suite on the upper floor was built in 1991.

== See also ==
- List of the oldest buildings in New Jersey
- Salem County Insane Asylum
- National Register of Historic Places listings in Salem County, New Jersey
