= Collins B. Allen =

American politician (1866–1953)

52nd President of the New Jersey Senate
- In office 1921
- Preceded by: Clarence E. Case
- Succeeded by: William B. Mackay Jr.

Majority Leader of the New Jersey Senate
- In office 1920

Member of the New Jersey Senate from Salem County
- In office 1915–1923
- Preceded by: Isaac S. Smick
- Succeeded by: J. Gilbert Borton

Sheriff of Salem County
- In office 1905–1908

Personal details
- Born: Collins Bassett Allen; August 9, 1866 Mannington Township, New Jersey, U.S.
- Died: January 12, 1953 (aged 86)
- Resting place: East View Cemetery, Salem, New Jersey, US
- Party: Republican
- Children: 3
- Occupation: Farmer, politician

Collins Bassett Allen (August 9, 1866 – January 12, 1953) was an American politician from New Jersey.

== Life ==
Allen was born on August 9, 1866, in the old Bassett homestead in Mannington Township, New Jersey, the son of farmer Samuel Pancoast Allen and Hannah Davis Bassett.

Allen attended local public schools and a private school in Salem. He then began working as a farmer in the latter place. He was a director of the Salem National Banking Company and the South Jersey Farmer's Exchange. He studied the diseases and care of stock under a Dr. Cooper, and did work as a castrator in southern New Jersey. At one point, he was appointed an officer in the New Jersey State Prison in Trenton and lived there, although he returned to his 175-acre farm and resumed working there. The farm belonged to his father-in-law Wyatt W. Miller.

In 1896, Allen was elected a school trustee. In 1897, he was appointed district clerk of the schools and elected township clerk. He held the latter office until 1913. From 1905 to 1908, he served as sheriff of Salem County. In 1913, he unsuccessfully ran for the New Jersey Senate for a one-year term against Isaac S. Smick. In 1914, he was elected to the Senate as a Republican over Smick, representing Salem County. He served in the Senate in 1915, 1916, 1917, 1918, 1919, 1920, 1921, 1922, and 1923. He was Senate Majority Leader in 1920, President of the Senate in 1921, and Chairman of the Appropriations Committee in 1922. He resigned from the Mannington Board of Education in 1921, when he left the township.

Allen left his farm in 1921 and moved to the city of Salem to focus exclusively on his political career. In 1925, President Calvin Coolidge appointed him Collector of Customs for the Philadelphia District, headquartered in Philadelphia. He held that office for eight and a half years. He was appointed to the South Jersey Port Commission when it was founded. He served on the Commission until 1937, when he became its treasurer.

Allen was master of the Salem Grange and a member of the Knights of Pythias. He belonged to the Society of Friends. In 1892, he married Hetty Hall Miller. Their children were Elsie M., Mary G., and Elizabeth. Hetty died in 1900, and in 1941 Allen married Helen Thompson.

Allen died in the Salem County Memorial Hospital on January 12, 1953. He was buried in the East View Cemetery.

Political offices
Preceded by Clarence E. Case	President of the New Jersey Senate; 1921	Succeeded by William B. Mackay Jr.
