= John F. Starr =

American politician

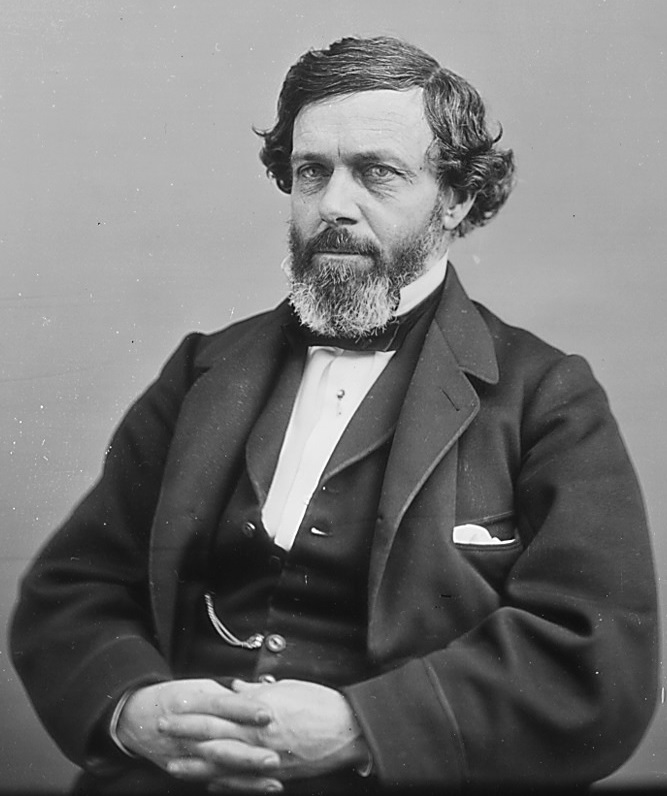

Member of the U.S. House of Representatives from New Jersey's 1st district
- In office March 4, 1863 – March 3, 1867
- Preceded by: John T. Nixon
- Succeeded by: William Moore

Personal details
- Born: John Farson Starr; March 25, 1818 Philadelphia, Pennsylvania, U.S.
- Died: August 9, 1904 (aged 86) Atlantic City, New Jersey, U.S.
- Resting place: Harleigh Cemetery
- Party: Republican
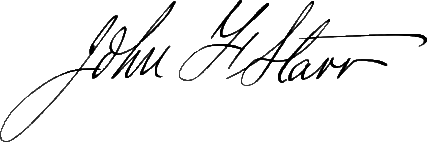
- Signature

John Farson Starr (March 25, 1818 – August 9, 1904) was an American businessman and Republican Party politician who served two terms in the United States House of Representatives, where he represented New Jersey's 1st congressional district for two terms from 1863 to 1867.

== Early life and career ==
Starr was born in Philadelphia on March 25, 1818. He completed preparatory studies, and moved to Camden, New Jersey in 1844.

=== Business ===
He was one of the founders of the Camden Iron Works and engaged in mercantile pursuits. He was president of the First National Bank of Camden for over thirty years, up to the time of his death.

== Congress ==
Starr was elected as a Republican to the Thirty-eighth and Thirty-ninth Congresses, serving in office from March 4, 1863 – March 3, 1867, but was not a candidate for renomination in 1866.

=== Death and burial ===
He died in Atlantic City, New Jersey on August 9, 1904, and was interred in Harleigh Cemetery in Camden.

U.S. House of Representatives
| Preceded by John T. Nixon | Member of the U.S. House of Representatives from New Jersey's 1st congressional district 1863–1867 | Succeeded by William Moore |
