= William Moore (New Jersey politician) =

American politician

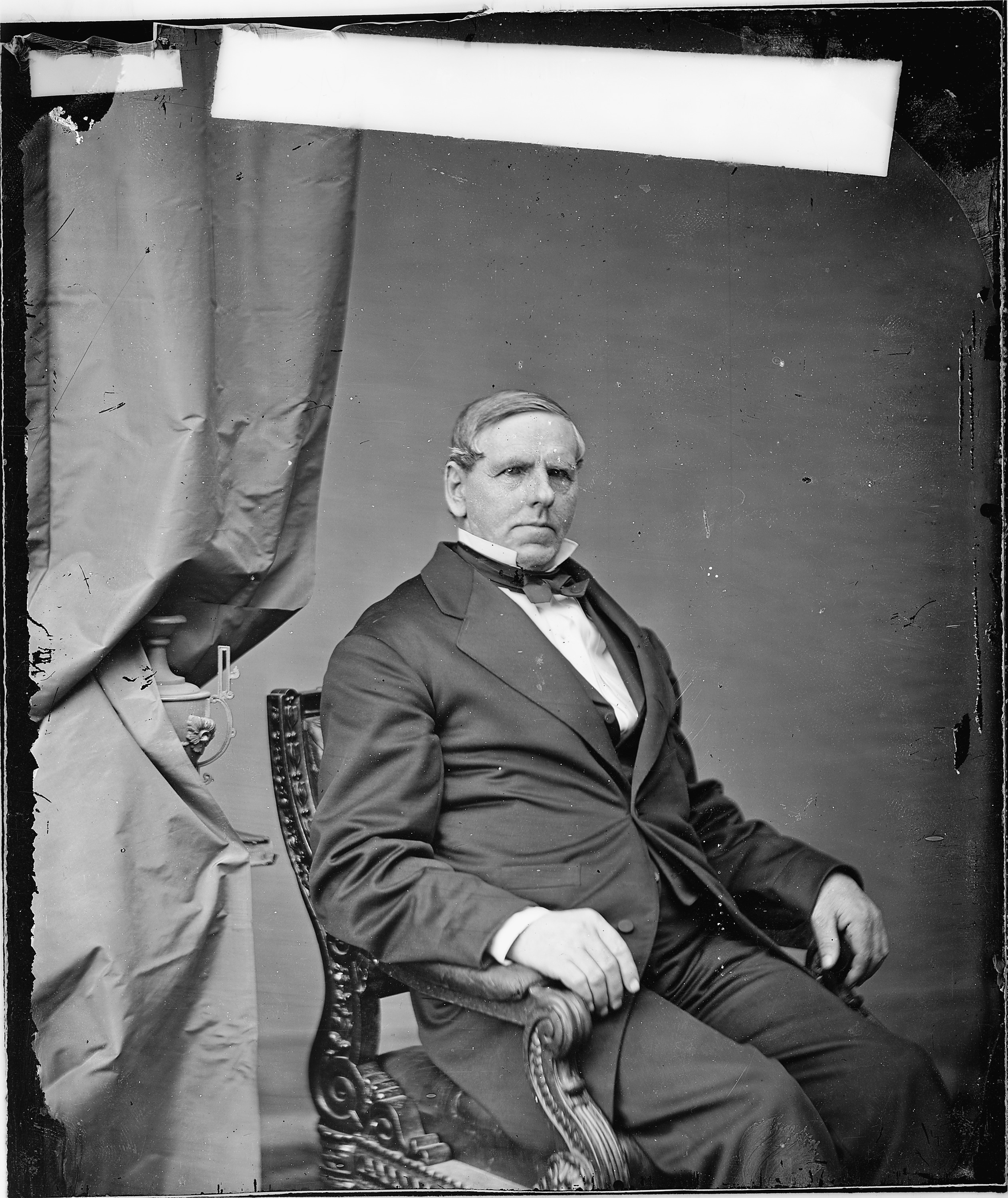

Member of the U.S. House of Representatives from New Jersey's 1st district
- In office March 4, 1867 – March 3, 1871
- Preceded by: John F. Starr
- Succeeded by: John W. Hazelton

Member of the New Jersey Senate from Atlantic County
- In office 1872-1875
- Preceded by: Jesse Adams
- Succeeded by: Hosea F. Madden

Personal details
- Born: December 25, 1810 Norristown, Pennsylvania, U.S.
- Died: April 26, 1878 (aged 67) Mays Landing, New Jersey, U.S.
- Party: Republican

William Moore (December 25, 1810 – April 26, 1878) was an American Republican Party politician, who served in the United States House of Representatives, where he represented New Jersey's 1st congressional district from 1867 to 1871.

Moore was born in Norristown, Pennsylvania on December 25, 1810. He attended private schools for a short time, became engaged in mercantile pursuits and later in ironworks. He moved to New Jersey in 1845 and settled in Atlantic County, New Jersey at Weymouth Furnace or Weymouth Works in Hamilton Township, Atlantic County, New Jersey, working as the manager for Stephen Colwell. He engaged in the iron business there, and also became interested in the building and sailing of vessels and in the development of banks and other financial institutions. He was a judge of the Court of Common Pleas for Atlantic County from 1855 to 1865. He was one of the founders of the Republican Party and a delegate to the 1856 Republican National Convention. He moved to Mays Landing, New Jersey in 1865 and engaged in the shipbuilding business, in banking, and in the iron industry.

Moore was elected as a Republican to the Fortieth and Forty-first Congresses, serving in office from March 4, 1867 – March 3, 1871. He was chairman of the Committee on Expenditures in the Post Office Department in the Forty-first Congress. He was unsuccessful candidate for renomination in 1870

After leaving Congress, he resumed his former business pursuits. He served in the New Jersey Senate from 1872 to 1875. He died at Mays Landing on April 26, 1878, and was interred there in Union Cemetery.

U.S. House of Representatives
Preceded by John F. Starr	Member of the U.S. House of Representatives from New Jersey's 1st congressional district March 4, 1867–March 3, 1871	Succeeded by John W. Hazelton
