= Marshalltown, New Jersey =

Populated place in Salem County, New Jersey, US

- Unincorporated community
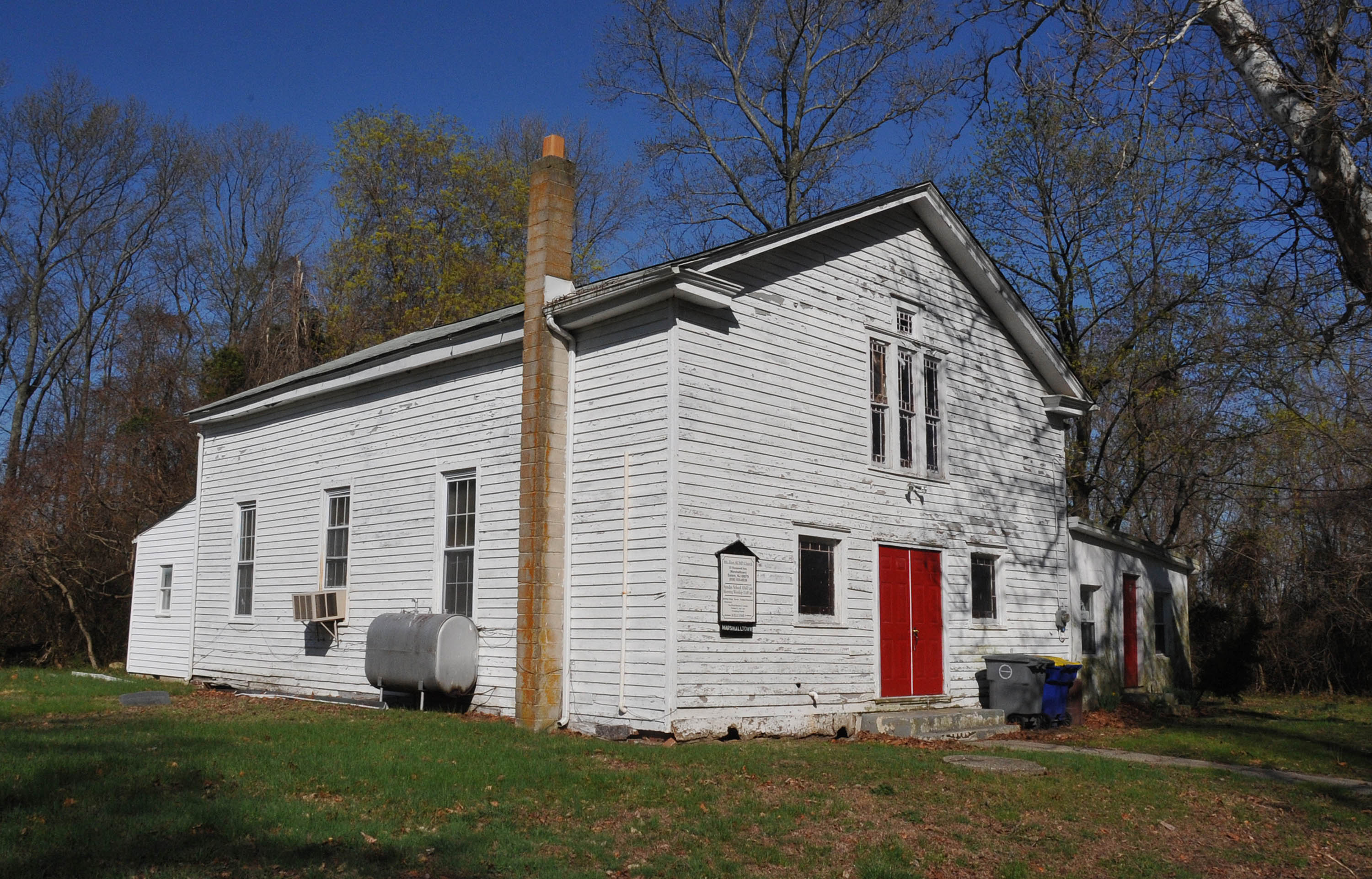
- Mt. Zion African Union Methodist Protestant Church

- Location within Salem County, New Jersey Location within New Jersey Location within the United States
- Coordinates: 39°38′15″N 75°27′12″W
- Country: United States
- State: New Jersey
- County: Salem
- Township: Mannington
- Named after: Thomas Marshall
- Elevation: 3 ft (0.91 m)
- Time zone: UTC−05:00 (Eastern (EST))
  - Summer (DST): UTC−04:00 (EDT)
- GNIS feature ID: 878149

Marshalltown is an unincorporated community located within Mannington Township, in Salem County, New Jersey. It has also been known as Frogtown.

The community is centered at Marshalltown Road and Roosevelt Avenue, located 2.7 miles (4.3 km) southeast of Glenside and 3.6 miles (5.8 km) east-southeast of Pennsville.

== History ==
Located near the Salem River, Marshalltown was one of five pre-Civil War communities developed along tributaries of the Delaware River by freedmen. It is named after Thomas Marshall (1803–1856), who purchased land here starting in 1834.

Before the abolition of slavery, these black-populated communities offered protection and aid to fugitive slaves, and "the likelihood that there was antebellum Underground Railroad activity is high".

The settlement once contained many houses and gardens, a school, stores, and two churches. Mount Zion A.U.M.P. Church in Marshalltown is one of the earliest African Methodist churches.

By 2010, only a school house, a church, and two cemeteries survived, and "isolation, theft, vandalism, and lack of historic preservation planning threaten the surviving cultural landscape of Marshalltown".

== Historic district ==
- Marshalltown Historic District
- U.S. National Register of Historic Places
- U.S. Historic district
- New Jersey Register of Historic Places
- Location: Roosevelt Avenue and Marshalltown Road
- Area: 166 acres (67 ha)
- Architectural style: Classical Revival, Late 19th And 20th Century Revivals
- NRHP reference No.: 13000498
- NJRHP No.: 5042

Significant dates
- Added to NRHP: July 17, 2013
- Designated NJRHP: February 21, 2013

The Marshalltown Historic District is a 166-acre (67 ha) historic district encompassing the community. It was added to the National Register of Historic Places on July 17, 2013, for its significance in architecture, ethnic heritage - Black, community development, landscape architecture, religion, and social history from 1834 to 1951. The district includes 7 contributing buildings and 33 contributing sites.

== See also ==
- National Register of Historic Places listings in Salem County, New Jersey
