= Forman S. Acton =

American computer scientist

- Born: August 10, 1920; Salem, New Jersey
- Died: February 18, 2014 (aged 93); Woodstown, New Jersey
- Scientific career
- Fields: Computer Science
- Workplaces: Princeton University

Forman Sinnickson Acton (August 10, 1920 – February 18, 2014) was an American computer scientist, engineer, educator and author. He was an emeritus professor in the Department of Computer Science at Princeton University.

== Education ==
Acton began his education in the Salem City School system. He left at the end of 9th grade to attend boarding school at Phillips Exeter Academy in Exeter, New Hampshire, from which he graduated in 1939. He then attended Princeton University, obtaining his Bachelor of Science degree in 1943, and his Master of Science degree in chemical engineering in 1944.

He was drafted into the Army in June 1944, and worked for the U.S. Army at Oak Ridge, at a facility that played a key role in the Manhattan Project, for the remainder of World War II. After the war, he became the second graduate from Carnegie Institute of Technology to earn a Ph.D. in applied mathematics.

== Career ==
Acton spent three years at the U.S. National Bureau of Standards' Institute for Numerical Analysis at the University of California at Los Angeles, where he worked on a machine called SWAC (Standards Western Automatic Computer), one of the first digital computers.

In 1952, he returned to Princeton to teach in the mathematics department, and served as director of the Analytical Research Group. While there, his group worked on military weapons, contributing to systems such as the U-2 spy plane and the Nike anti-aircraft missile. He also became an expert and teacher on the IAS Machine, another of the first computers, which was located at the Institute for Advanced Study.

During this time, Acton worked with other important figures in early computing, including Princeton Professor John Tukey, who coined the terms "software" and "bit," and Thomas Kurtz, who went on to co-invent the computer language BASIC. Other contemporaries he knew and worked with included Albert W. Tucker, Grace Hopper, Richard Feynman, James H. Wilkinson, Claude Shannon, John Backus, and John Nash.

Acton moved to the Department of Electrical Engineering in 1955. In 1963, he made the first of two extended visits to the Indian Institute of Technology at Kanpur, India, where he helped establish the school's early computing facilities and courses. He initially stayed for one year, and he returned in 1967 to teach and offer organizational advice.

As computing evolved, Princeton's electrical engineering department added "computer science" to its name before the Department of Computer Science became its own department in 1985. Acton retired as professor of computer science in 1989.

== Books ==
Acton is known for his 1970 book Numerical Methods That Work, which was reissued in 1990 by the Mathematical Association of America. More recently, he published Real Computing Made Real: Preventing Errors in Scientific and Engineering Calculations.

== Philanthropy ==
Before his death, Acton made several anonymous scholarship donations to students in the Salem City School District in Salem County, NJ. Before he died, he made it clear to friends and confidants that he wanted youth in the Salem area, where he was born and raised, to have access to the educational experiences he enjoyed. The Forman S. Acton Educational Foundation was officially incorporated in October 2014, and it currently provides financial assistance for youth in the greater Salem community.
