= John W. Hazelton =

American politician (1814–1878)

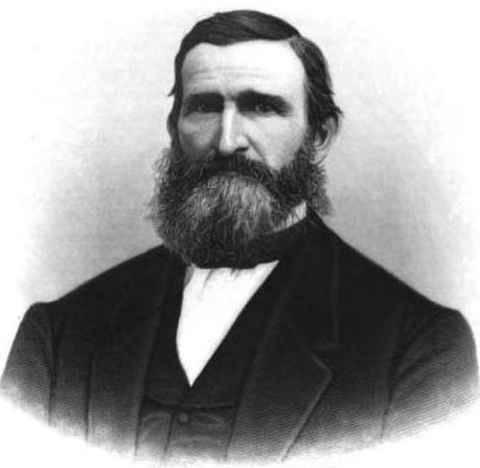
- Hazelton in 1874

Member of the U.S. House of Representatives from New Jersey's 1st district
- In office March 4, 1871 – March 3, 1875
- Preceded by: William Moore
- Succeeded by: Clement Hall Sinnickson

Personal details
- Born: John Wright Hazelton; December 10, 1814 Mullica Hill, New Jersey, US
- Died: December 20, 1878 (aged 64) Mullica Hill, New Jersey, US
- Resting place: Friends Cemetery in Mullica Hill
- Party: Republican

John Wright Hazelton (December 10, 1814 – December 20, 1878) was an American politician. He was a member of the United States House of Representatives from Missouri.

== Biography ==
Hazelton was born in Mullica Hill, Gloucester County, New Jersey, on December 10, 1814. He attended the common schools and was a farmer.

A Republican, Hazelton was a delegate to the Republican National Convention in 1856 and 1868. He was elected as a Republican to the Forty-second and Forty-third Congresses, serving in office from March 4, 1871 to March 3, 1875. During his second term, he was elected by a majority of over six thousand; at the time, it was the largest majority ever achieved in the district. He was an unsuccessful candidate for reelection in 1874 to the Forty-fourth Congress.

After leaving Congress, Hazelton returned to agriculture. He died on December 20, 1878, aged 64, in Mullica Hill. He is buried in Friends Cemetery, in Mullica Hill.

U.S. House of Representatives
Preceded by William Moore	Member of the U.S. House of Representatives from New Jersey's 1st congressional district March 4, 1871 – March 3, 1875	Succeeded by Clement Hall Sinnickson
