= John R. Patrick =

American business executive who worked at IBM

John Russell Patrick
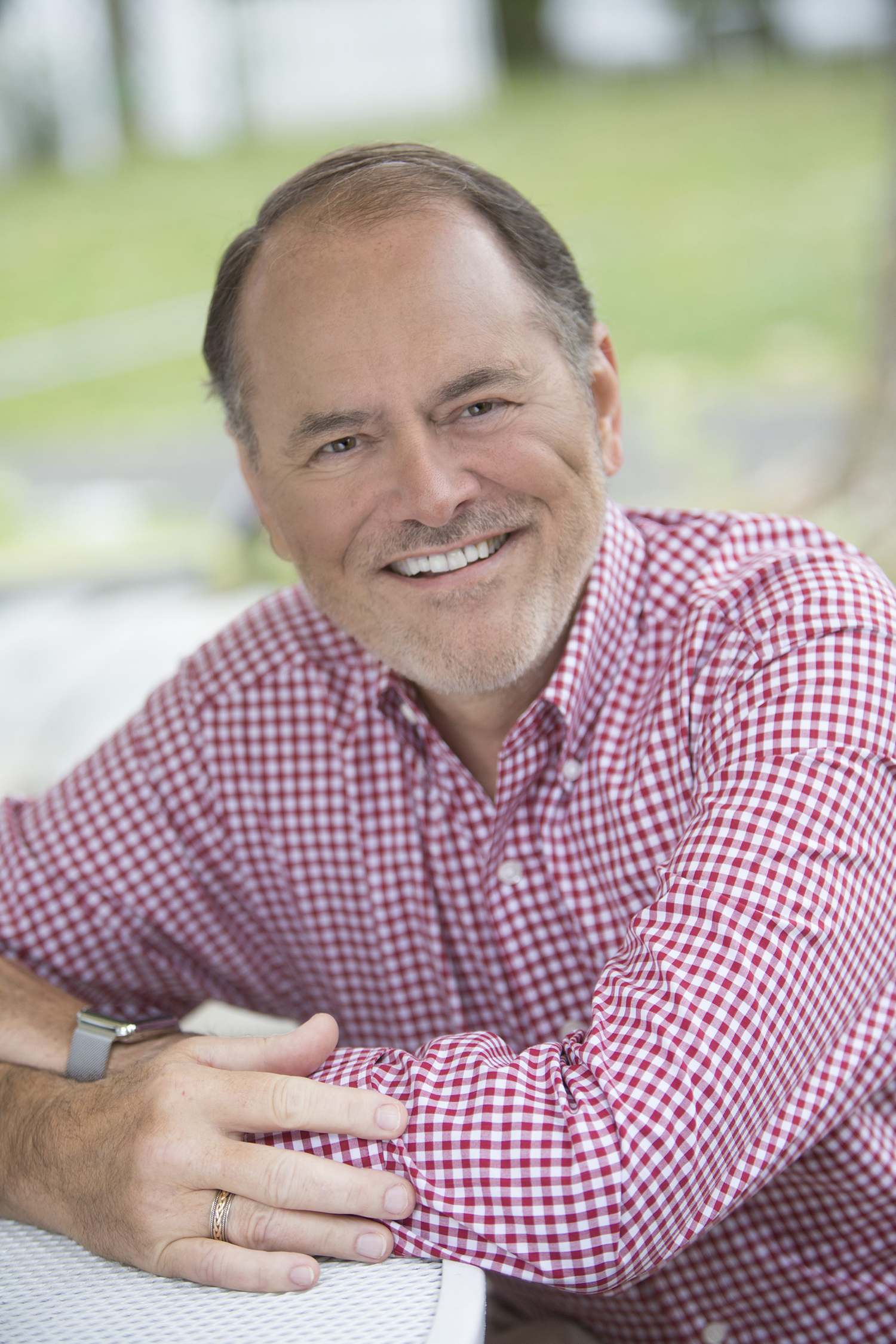
- Patrick in 2016
- Born: August 5, 1945 (age 81); Salem, New Jersey, United States
- Education: University of South Florida, LaSalle Extension University
- Occupation: Business executive
- Known for: Launched the IBM ThinkPad and the OS/2 operating system as Vice President at IBM
- Spouse: Joanne Patrick
- Children: 4

John Russell Patrick (born August 5, 1945) is a business executive and author in the information technology industry. During his tenure as a vice president at IBM, he helped launch the IBM ThinkPad and the OS/2 operating system and was later an influential force behind IBM’s early adoption of the Internet and World Wide Web.

== Early life and education ==
Patrick was born in Salem, New Jersey, the son of Robert V. Patrick and Virginia Russell. He earned a Bachelor of Science degree in electrical engineering from Lehigh University in 1967, a Master of Science in management science from the University of South Florida in 1971, and a Bachelor of Laws from LaSalle Extension University in 1973. He served in the United States Army from 1969 to 1971.

He earned a doctor of health administration degree at the University of Phoenix in March 2014.

== Career ==
=== IBM years ===
Patrick joined IBM in 1967 and spent the first half of his employment there in various sales, marketing and management positions. In 1992 he became Vice President of Marketing for Personal Systems and in 1995 was named Vice President of Internet Technology, a position he held until his retirement in 2001.

In 1982, Patrick was one of the developers of the IBM Credit Corporation; that became the largest computer leasing company in the world. In 1992 he helped form the IBM PC Company that launched the IBM ThinkPad. In February 1993 he was named marketing vice president for the IBM unit that launched the OS/2 operating system.

In 1995 Patrick led the team that created IBM’s intranet and the IBM.com website. Patrick also formed an internal group called "WebAhead," which pioneered a Java-based corporate directory and an instant messaging system. He was also instrumental in creating alphaWorks, IBM’s online research and development laboratory for advanced Internet technology, and created the "Get Connected" program to expand the use of the Internet, both within the company and to serve as a model for other companies.

Concurrent to his employment at IBM, Patrick was involved in other technological initiatives. In December 1994, he was one of the founding sponsors of the World Wide Web Consortium at MIT. He was an early advocate of developing standards for content (Internet Content Rating Association) and privacy (p3P and TRUSTe). Later in 1994 he became a founding board member of Terisa Systems, a joint venture of RSA Data Security Inc. (RSA) and Enterprise Integration Technologies Corp. (EIT) to support technologies for secure Internet transactions. In 1995 he was a founding member and subsequent chairman of the Global Internet Project, an organization whose primary goal was to promote industry actions that would minimize the need for government regulation of the Internet.

In 1996 Patrick supported formation of Internet 2, a consortium of over 320 research universities and companies created to build a next-generation Internet. In 1998 he supported creation of the International Corporation for the Assignment of Names and Numbers, a non-profit global organization that enabled the Internet to continue growing without the disruption of regulation.

=== Attitude LLC ===
In 2001 he published Net Attitude: What It Is, How to Get It, and Why Your Company Can't Survive Without It. That same year, he founded Attitude LLC, and is currently engaged as a board director, speaker, and author. Patrick has since followed up with an updated version of Net Attitude. His books have evolved into a series called “Its All About Attitude”. Patrick believes many of the world’s biggest problems emanate from attitudes, and many of the solutions to the problems have their roots in attitude. The ongoing series of seven "Attitude" books cover topics as diverse as mHealth, robotics, home automation, crypto, and mobile blockchain voting. The series examines different technologies in pragmatic terms that explain their relevance to our lives and culture. The full list of books is in the Books section below.

== Personal life ==
He and his wife Joanne have four children and six grandchildren.

== Recognition ==
- In 1999 Network World named Patrick one of “the 25 most powerful people in networking…Whatever mistakes IBM has made in its 88-year history, it has redeemed itself in the eyes of the Internet, thanks in large part to John Patrick.”
- Fast Company's story “IBM’s Grassroots Revival” said, “Patrick wrote a manifesto called ‘Get Connected.’ It identified six principles that would reshape industries and reinvent companies. ‘Get Connected’ got results and Patrick turned that energy into a movement.”
- “R&D Stars to Watch | Industry Week" named Patrick among thirty individuals who drive innovation and provide the initial spark to economic growth.
- Business 2.0 named him as one of the industry’s most intriguing minds.
- In 2008 he was named an IEEE Fellow “in recognition of his leadership in technical and policy development of the World Wide Web.”
- Nuvance Health Digital Patient Experience Executive Committee

== Bibliography ==
- Reflection Attitude: Past, Current, and Future (Attitude LLC, 2022)
- Robot Attitude: How Robots and Artificial Intelligence Will Make Our Lives Better (Attitude LLC, 2019)
- Home Attitude: Everything You Need To Know To Make Your Home Smart (Attitude LLC, 2017)
- Net Attitude: What it is, How to Get it, and Why it is More Important Than Ever (Attitude LLC, 2016)
- Election Attitude: How Internet Voting Leads to a Stronger Democracy (Attitude LLC, 2016)
- Health Attitude: Unraveling and Solving the Complexities of Healthcare. (Attitude LLC, 2015) ISBN 069235736X.
- Net Attitude: What It Is, How to Get It, and Why Your Company Can't Survive Without It. (Cambridge, MA: Perseus, 2001) ISBN 978-0-7382-0513-7. OCLC#48247469.

== Other publications by John R. Patrick ==
- “Internet Usage Guidelines in a Commercial Setting.” Internet Society Proceedings, 1995.
- “Shaping Up the Internet.” Informationweek no. 597 (September 16, 1996): 174.
- “The Infinite Advantage of Infinite Information.” Across the Board Vol. 34, no. 1 (January 1997): 57.
- “Get Connected! An Internet-based Communications Program to Re-engineer the Way You Do Business.” The Journal for Quality and Participation. Vol. 20, no. 2 (March 1997): 76-81.
- "The Future of the Internet". Design Management Institute Review. 14 (2 (Spring 2003)): 29–35. Archived from the original on 2012-03-07.
- "The Ultimate Internet". Network World. 2003-11-10. Archived from the original on 2008-11-01.
- "Best Business Books 2004: The Bubble". Strategy+business. 2004-11-30.
- "High Deductibles Spike Health Care Costs". The Hartford Courant. 2015-06-28.
- "Health Attitude" (PDF). Sun and Surf Magazine. 2015-07-01.
- Patrick, John R. (2015-07-15). "How mHealth will spur consumer-led healthcare". mHealth. 1 (5): 14. doi:10.3978/j.issn.2306-9740.2015.07.01. PMC 5344128. PMID 28293572.
