= Salem Medical Center =

- Community Healthcare Associates
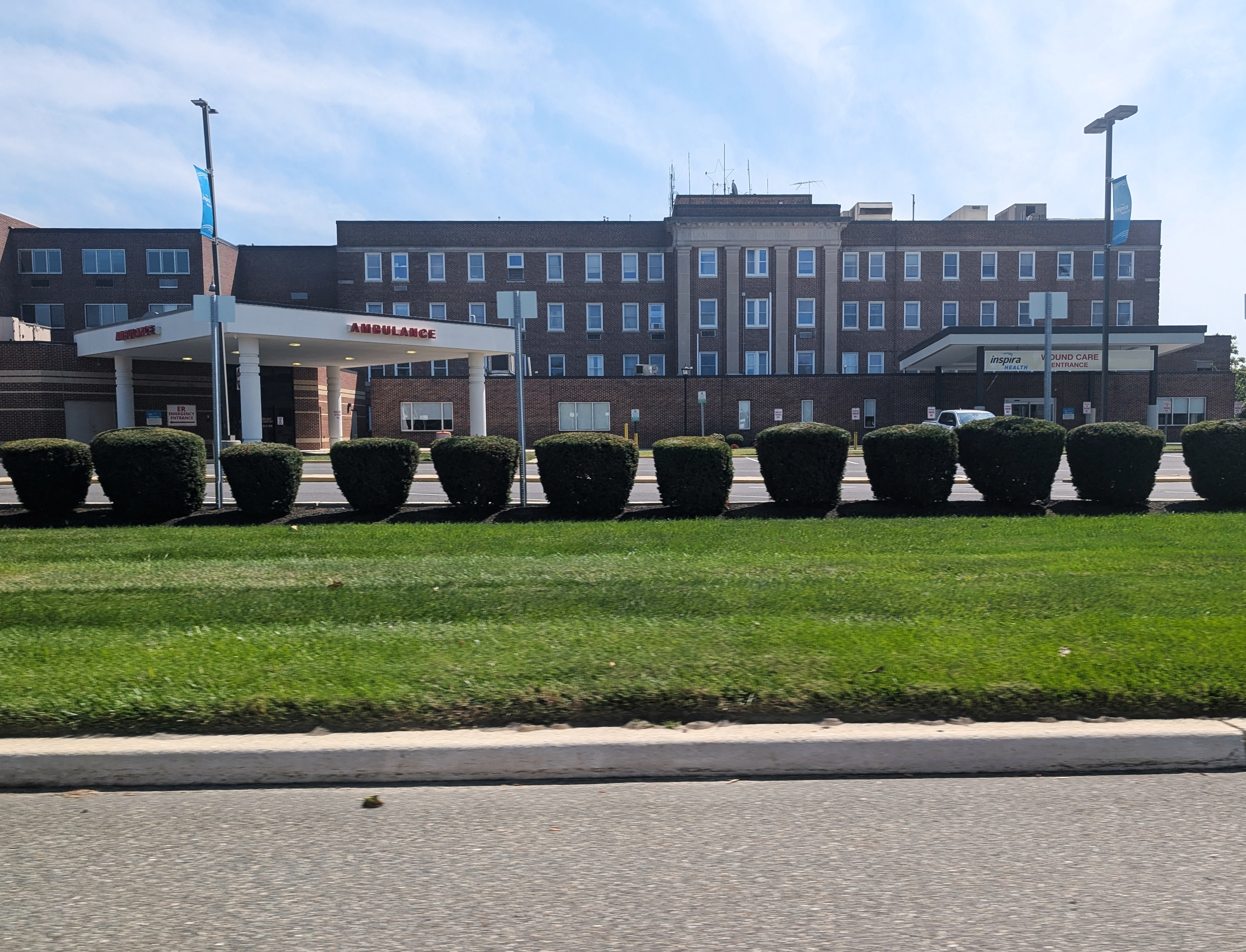

Geography
- Location: Salem, New Jersey, United States
- Coordinates: 39.593900°N 75.444662°W

Organization
- Funding: Non-profit hospital
- Type: General

Services
- Beds: 140

History
- Opened: 1919

Links
- Website: www.mhschealth.com
- Lists: Hospitals in New Jersey

The Salem Medical Center is a hospital in Salem County, New Jersey located at the Pointers in Mannington Township. It was founded as the Memorial Hospital of Salem County.

== History ==
The hospital was founded in 1919, after which it operated as a non-profit. It was founded in downtown Salem and moved to Mannington Township in 1951. It has 126 beds, and in 2017, New Jersey approved a plan to sell it to Prime Healthcare Foundation. The name of the hospital was change to Salem Medical Center in 2019 when it was acquired by Community Healthcare Associates.

In 2002, Community Health Systems acquired Memorial Hospital for $34 million. When the purchase occurred, the Salem Health and Wellness Foundation was formed, with the goal over overseeing donations and proceeds acquired by MHSC. This was because the state required the proceeds from the sale to Community Health Systems to be "overseen by a foundation that would pay to enhance medical services in the area." However, 12 years later, Senate President Steve Sweeney argued that the foundation was sitting on $56 million, and had "disbursed very little to expand health care services."

In 2010, a plan by MHSC to close its maternity ward was withdrawn after public outcry. In November 2013, the hospital's board again applied to close its maternity ward, so it could allocate resources to other areas such as surgical infrastructure. The New Jersey Department of Health and Senior Services approved the decision on April 1, 2014. The health department noted that the hospital had only one obstetrician at the staff, and births at the hospital had dropped from 385 in 2004 to 155 in 2012. As a condition of the closure, the hospital was still required to transport patients to other inpatient maternity services, or provide emergency stabilization to women arrive pregnant, and delivery in cases where birth is imminent. A local healthcare union spoke out against the decision, and Health Professionals and Allied Employees argued the closure would negatively affect local income-women. In the end of May 2014, the hospital closed its maternity ward.

In 2014, lawmakers in New Jersey drafted legislation to make it easier to sell Memorial Hospital to a potential non-profit purchaser.

In 2015, Community Health Systems Inc. agreed to sell the assets of Memorial Hospital of Salem County to Prime Healthcare Foundation. It also sold all related outpatient services. The hospital CEO Ryan Jensen resigned in December 2016, after joining as CEO in May 2014. The hospital had shrunk somewhat in size by then, and apart from closing its maternity ward it had decreased its beds from 140 to 126 in terms of registration. In that month, the hospital also re-elected new board members. The sale of the hospital was approved by the New Jersey State Health Planning Board in early February 2017, for $15 million. The facility had 126 beds. The board voted 7 to 0 in approval of the sale to Prime Healthcare Foundation. On the same day the state approved the sale Prime Healthcare backed out of the deal. The hospital is currently still looking for a buyer.

In 2018, Community Healthcare Associates announced plans to acquire Memorial Hospital of Salem County. The plan was approved and CHA acquired the hospital on February 1, 2019, renaming the hospital “Salem Medical Center.”

On December 21, 2021, Salem Medical Center announced that Inspira Health Network was to acquire the hospital. Almost a year later, on December 15, 2022, Inspira Health Network acquired Salem Medical Center.

== See also ==
- List of hospitals in New Jersey
