= Mannington Township, New Jersey =

Township in Salem County, New Jersey, US

- Township
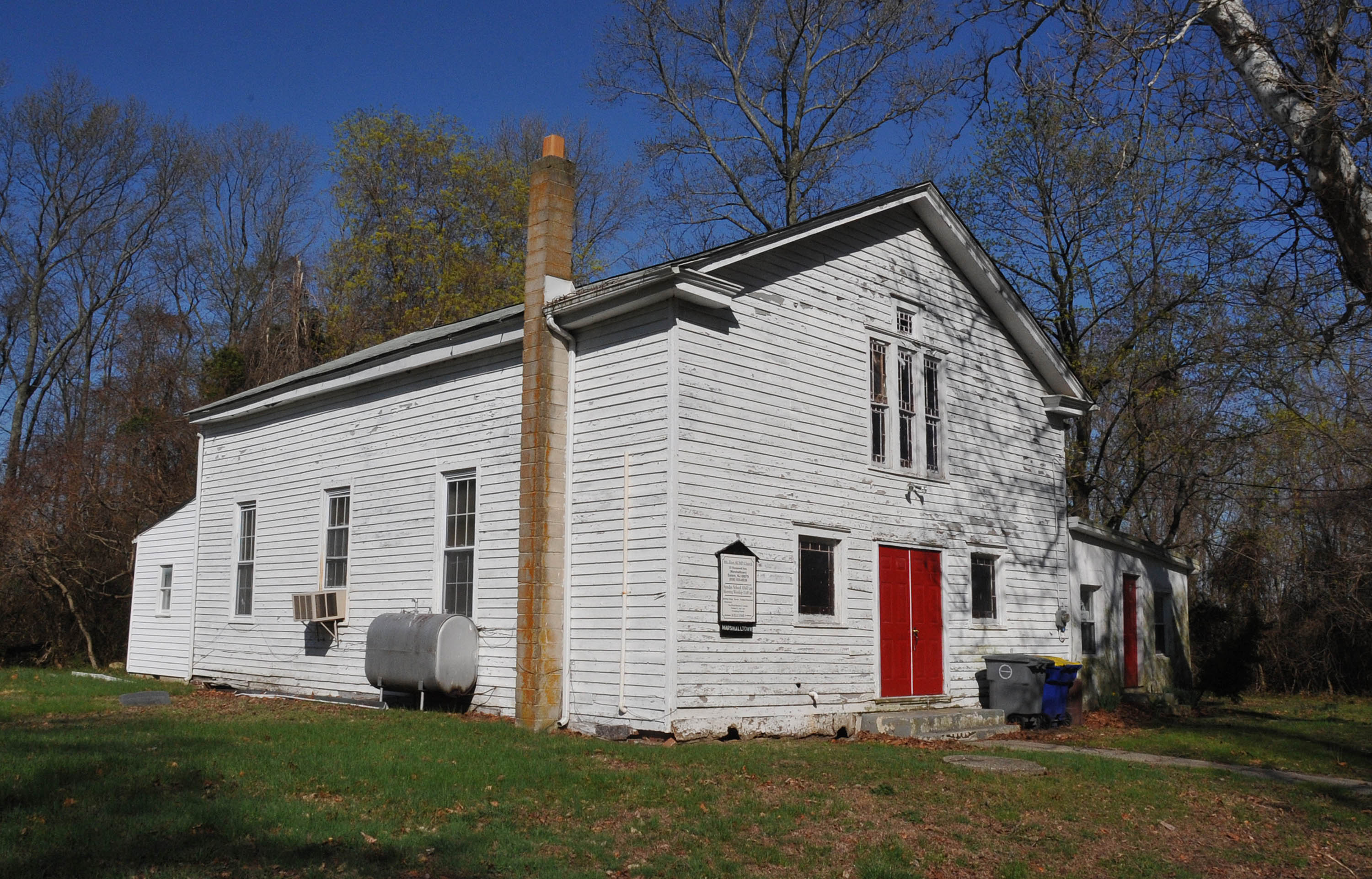
- Church in the Marshalltown Historic District

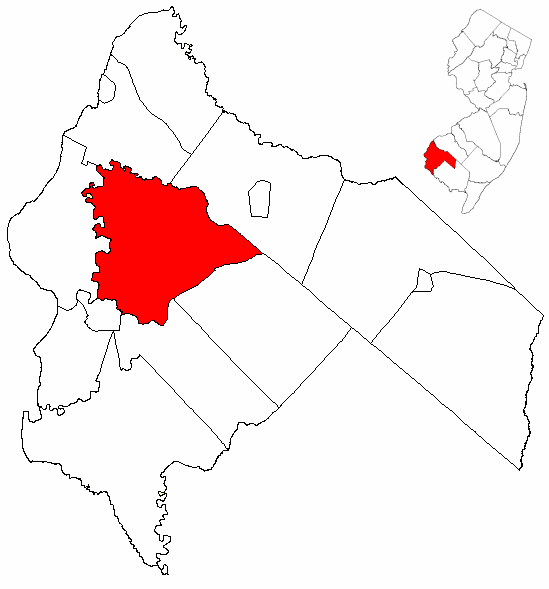
- Mannington Township highlighted in Salem County. Inset map: Salem County highlighted in the State of New Jersey.

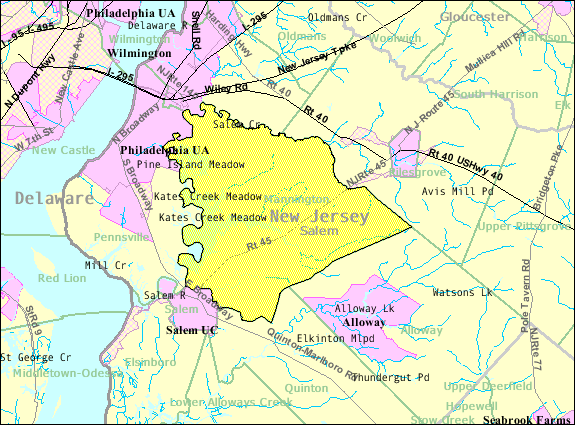
- Census Bureau map of Mannington Township, New Jersey

- Location in Salem County Location in New Jersey Location in the United States
- Coordinates: 39.623249°N 75.414662°W
- Country: United States
- State: New Jersey
- County: Salem
- Mentioned: May 12, 1701
- Incorporated: February 21, 1798

Government
  - Type: Township
  - Body: Township Committee
  - Mayor: Richard Eber (D, term ends December 31, 2026)
  - Municipal clerk / Administrator: Esther A. Mitchell

Area
  - Total: 37.90 sq mi (98.17 km^{2})
  - Land: 33.88 sq mi (87.76 km^{2})
  - Water: 4.02 sq mi (10.41 km^{2}) 10.61%
  - Rank: 62nd of 565 in state 4th of 15 in county
- Elevation: 3 ft (0.91 m)

Population (2020)
  - Total: 1,475
  - Estimate (2023): 1,468
  - Rank: 512th of 565 in state 13th of 15 in county
  - Density: 43.5/sq mi (16.8/km^{2})
  - Rank: 554th of 565 in state 14th of 15 in county
- Time zone: UTC−05:00 (Eastern (EST))
  - Summer (DST): UTC−04:00 (Eastern (EDT))
- ZIP Code: 08079 – Salem
- Area code: 856 exchanges: 339, 769, 878, 935
- FIPS code: 3403343200
- GNIS feature ID: 0882133
- Website: manningtontwp.com

Mannington Township is a township in Salem County, in the U.S. state of New Jersey. As of the 2020 United States census, the township's population was 1,475, a decrease of 331 (−18.3%) from the 2010 census count of 1,806, which in turn reflected an increase of 247 (+15.8%) from the 1,559 counted in the 2000 census.

== History ==
Mannington Township was first mentioned on May 12, 1701. It had been previously known as East Fenwick Township, which was mentioned on September 3, 1679, though the details of its incorporation are unknown. The township was incorporated by New Jersey Legislature's Township Act of 1798 on February 21, 1798, as one of New Jersey's original group of 104 townships. A portion of the township was taken in 1878 and annexed by Quinton Township. The township's name derives from the Lenape deity, variously spelled as Maneto or Manito.

As a dry town, the sale of alcohol is not legally permitted.

Among the oldest buildings are Barrett's Plantation House and the Salem County Insane Asylum.

== Geography ==
According to the United States Census Bureau, the township had a total area of 37.90 square miles (98.17 km^{2}), including 33.88 square miles (87.76 km^{2}) of land and 4.02 square miles (10.41 km^{2}) of water (10.61%).

The Salem River flows along the township's northern and western boundaries.

The township borders the Salem County municipalities of Alloway Township, Carneys Point Township, Pennsville Township, Pilesgrove Township, Quinton Township and Salem.

Unincorporated communities, localities and place names located partially or completely within the township include Acton, Claysville, Halltown, Marshalltown, Pointers, Portertown, Slapes Corner, Welchtown and Welchville.

As of 2026, the township is a member of Local Leaders for Responsible Planning in order to address the township's Mount Laurel doctrine-based housing obligations.

== Demographics ==
Historical population
| Census | Pop. | Note | %± |
|---|---|---|---|
| 1810 | 1,664 | | — |
| 1820 | 1,732 | | 4.1% |
| 1830 | 1,726 | | −0.3% |
| 1840 | 2,064 | | 19.6% |
| 1850 | 2,187 | | 6.0% |
| 1860 | 2,393 | | 9.4% |
| 1870 | 2,351 | | −1.8% |
| 1880 | 2,230 | | −5.1% |
| 1890 | 1,870 | | −16.1% |
| 1900 | 1,745 | | −6.7% |
| 1910 | 1,606 | | −8.0% |
| 1920 | 1,456 | | −9.3% |
| 1930 | 1,584 | | 8.8% |
| 1940 | 1,656 | | 4.5% |
| 1950 | 1,686 | | 1.8% |
| 1960 | 2,024 | | 20.0% |
| 1970 | 1,913 | | −5.5% |
| 1980 | 1,740 | | −9.0% |
| 1990 | 1,693 | | −2.7% |
| 2000 | 1,559 | | −7.9% |
| 2010 | 1,806 | | 15.8% |
| 2020 | 1,475 | | −18.3% |
| 2023 (est.) | 1,468 | | −0.5% |
Population sources: 1810–2000; 1810–1920 1850–1870; 1850 1870 1880–1890; 1890–1910 1910–1930; 1940–2000 2000; 2010 2020

=== 2010 census ===
The 2010 United States census counted 1,806 people, 540 households, and 392 families in the township. The population density was 53.6 inhabitants per square mile (20.7/km^{2}). There were 592 housing units at an average density of 17.6 per square mile (6.8/km^{2}). The racial makeup was 72.59% (1,311) White, 21.10% (381) Black or African American, 0.66% (12) Native American, 0.44% (8) Asian, 0.00% (0) Pacific Islander, 3.93% (71) from other races, and 1.27% (23) from two or more races. Hispanic or Latino of any race were 8.19% (148) of the population.

Of the 540 households, 27.4% had children under the age of 18; 58.0% were married couples living together; 10.2% had a female householder with no husband present and 27.4% were non-families. Of all households, 22.6% were made up of individuals and 9.8% had someone living alone who was 65 years of age or older. The average household size was 2.65 and the average family size was 3.09.

18.3% of the population were under the age of 18, 10.3% from 18 to 24, 26.7% from 25 to 44, 27.2% from 45 to 64, and 17.4% who were 65 years of age or older. The median age was 41.4 years. For every 100 females, the population had 141.8 males. For every 100 females ages 18 and older there were 143.0 males.

The Census Bureau's 2006–2010 American Community Survey showed that (in 2010 inflation-adjusted dollars) median household income was $63,650 (with a margin of error of +/− $5,287) and the median family income was $75,625 (+/− $17,613). Males had a median income of $59,896 (+/− $6,020) versus $42,159 (+/− $10,096) for females. The per capita income for the borough was $33,369 (+/− $5,096). About 6.1% of families and 6.7% of the population were below the poverty line, including 10.2% of those under age 18 and 8.2% of those age 65 or over.

=== 2000 census ===
As of the 2000 United States census there were 1,559 people, 539 households, and 409 families residing in the township. The population density was 44.8 inhabitants per square mile (17.3/km^{2}). There were 573 housing units at an average density of 16.5 per square mile (6.4/km^{2}). The racial makeup of the township was 75.63% White, 20.91% African American, 0.51% Native American, 0.38% Asian, 1.73% from other races, and 0.83% from two or more races. Hispanic or Latino of any race were 3.34% of the population.

There were 539 households, out of which 26.5% had children under the age of 18 living with them, 60.9% were married couples living together, 10.4% had a female householder with no husband present, and 24.1% were non-families. 20.6% of all households were made up of individuals, and 10.0% had someone living alone who was 65 years of age or older. The average household size was 2.63 and the average family size was 3.02.

In the township the population was spread out, with 22.6% under the age of 18, 4.8% from 18 to 24, 25.5% from 25 to 44, 23.7% from 45 to 64, and 23.4% who were 65 years of age or older. The median age was 43 years. For every 100 females, there were 95.9 males. For every 100 females age 18 and over, there were 88.6 males.

The median income for a household in the township was $52,625, and the median income for a family was $62,500. Males had a median income of $45,714 versus $29,727 for females. The per capita income for the township was $24,262. About 3.8% of families and 6.9% of the population were below the poverty line, including 11.5% of those under age 18 and 8.1% of those age 65 or over.

== Economy ==
Mannington Mills operates a manufacturing facility which occupies over 500 acres (200 ha), which it moved to Mannington after the company was established in Salem in 1915. In 2010, the company undertook an extensive cleanup of contaminated soil on the plant site.

== Government ==
=== Local government ===
Mannington Township is governed under the Township form of New Jersey municipal government, one of 141 municipalities (of the 564) statewide that use this form, the second-most commonly used form of government in the state. The governing body is a three-member Township Committee, whose members are elected directly by the voters at-large in partisan elections to serve three-year terms of office on a staggered basis, with one seat coming up for election each year as part of the November general election in a three-year cycle. At an annual reorganization meeting conducted during the first week of January, the Township Committee selects one of its members to serve as Mayor and another as Deputy Mayor.

As of 2022, members of the Mannington Township Committee are Mayor Donald C. Asay (R, term on committee and as mayor ends December 31, 2022), Deputy Mayor Luke S. Patrick Jr. (R, term on committee ends 2024; term as deputy mayor ends 2022) and Kenneth H. Dunham Jr. (R, 2024).

In the 2012 general election, the Township Committee had Democrats in the majority for the first time in township history, though the committee decided to choose the committee's only Republican, Donald C. Asay, as mayor.

=== Federal, state and county representation ===
Mannington Township is located in the 2nd Congressional District and is part of New Jersey's 3rd state legislative district.

For the 119th United States Congress, New Jersey's 2nd congressional district is represented by Jeff Van Drew (R, Dennis Township). New Jersey is represented in the United States Senate by Democrats Cory Booker (Newark, term ends 2027) and Andy Kim (Moorestown, term ends 2031).

For the 2026–2027 session, the 3rd legislative district of the New Jersey Legislature is represented in the State Senate by John Burzichelli (D, Paulsboro) and in the General Assembly by David Bailey (D, Woodstown) and Heather Simmons (D, Glassboro).

Salem County is governed by a five-member Board of County Commissioners who are elected at-large to serve three-year terms of office on a staggered basis, with either one or two seats coming up for election each year. At an annual reorganization meeting held in the beginning of January, the board selects a Director and a Deputy Director from among its members. As of 2025, Salem County's Commissioners (with party, residence, and term-end year listed in parentheses) are:

Director Benjamin H. Laury (R, Elmer, 2027), Deputy Director Cordy Taylor (R, Oldmans Township, 2028), Paul Collier (R, Lower Alloways Creek, 2027), Ed Ramsey (R, Pittsgrove Township, 2026), and Daniel Timmerman (R, Elmer, 2028).

Constitutional officers elected on a countywide basis are: Clerk Dale A. Cross (R, Pennsville Township, 2029), Sheriff Charles M. Miller (R, Salem, 2027) and Surrogate Gordon J. Ostrum Jr. (R, Pilesgrove Township, 2030).

=== Politics ===
As of March 2011, there were a total of 1,014 registered voters in Mannington Township, of which 243 (24.0% vs. 30.6% countywide) were registered as Democrats, 285 (28.1% vs. 21.0%) were registered as Republicans and 486 (47.9% vs. 48.4%) were registered as Unaffiliated. There were no voters registered to other parties. Among the township's 2010 Census population, 56.1% (vs. 64.6% in Salem County) were registered to vote, including 68.7% of those ages 18 and over (vs. 84.4% countywide).

Gubernatorial election results for Mannington Township
| Year | Republican | | Democratic | | Third party(ies) | |
| Year | No. | % | No. | % | No. | % |
|---|---|---|---|---|---|---|
| 2025 | 381 | 67.55% | 179 | 31.74% | 4 | 0.71% |
| 2021 | 359 | 69.71% | 153 | 29.71% | 3 | 0.58% |
| 2017 | 268 | 58.52% | 171 | 37.34% | 19 | 4.15% |
| 2013 | 363 | 73.78% | 121 | 24.59% | 8 | 1.63% |
| 2009 | 268 | 47.10% | 225 | 39.54% | 76 | 13.36% |
| 2005 | 279 | 51.76% | 239 | 44.34% | 21 | 3.90% |

In the 2012 presidential election, Republican Mitt Romney received 55.8% of the vote (406 cast), ahead of Democrat Barack Obama with 42.1% (306 votes), and other candidates with 2.1% (15 votes), among the 734 ballots cast by the township's 1,036 registered voters (7 ballots were spoiled), for a turnout of 70.8%. In the 2008 presidential election, Republican John McCain received 394 votes (52.0% vs. 46.6% countywide), ahead of Democrat Barack Obama with 349 votes (46.0% vs. 50.4%) and other candidates with 10 votes (1.3% vs. 1.6%), among the 758 ballots cast by the township's 1,018 registered voters, for a turnout of 74.5% (vs. 71.8% in Salem County). In the 2004 presidential election, Republican George W. Bush received 414 votes (55.3% vs. 52.5% countywide), ahead of Democrat John Kerry with 324 votes (43.3% vs. 45.9%) and other candidates with 5 votes (0.7% vs. 1.0%), among the 748 ballots cast by the township's 1,021 registered voters, for a turnout of 73.3% (vs. 71.0% in the whole county).

United States presidential election results for Mannington Township 2024 2020 2016 2012 2008 2004
| Year | Republican | | Democratic | | Third party(ies) | |
| Year | No. | % | No. | % | No. | % |
|---|---|---|---|---|---|---|
| 2024 | 476 | 64.94% | 248 | 33.83% | 9 | 1.23% |
| 2020 | 493 | 62.80% | 282 | 35.92% | 10 | 1.27% |
| 2016 | 414 | 59.40% | 242 | 34.72% | 41 | 5.88% |
| 2012 | 406 | 55.85% | 306 | 42.09% | 15 | 2.06% |
| 2008 | 394 | 52.32% | 349 | 46.35% | 10 | 1.33% |
| 2004 | 414 | 55.72% | 324 | 43.61% | 5 | 0.67% |

In the 2013 gubernatorial election, Republican Chris Christie received 73.8% of the vote (363 cast), ahead of Democrat Barbara Buono with 24.6% (121 votes), and other candidates with 1.6% (8 votes), among the 497 ballots cast by the township's 999 registered voters (5 ballots were spoiled), for a turnout of 49.7%. In the 2009 gubernatorial election, Republican Chris Christie received 268 votes (46.7% vs. 46.1% countywide), ahead of Democrat Jon Corzine with 225 votes (39.2% vs. 39.9%), Independent Chris Daggett with 63 votes (11.0% vs. 9.7%) and other candidates with 11 votes (1.9% vs. 2.0%), among the 574 ballots cast by the township's 1,010 registered voters, yielding a 56.8% turnout (vs. 47.3% in the county).

United States Senate election results for Mannington Township1
| Year | Republican | | Democratic | | Third party(ies) | |
| Year | No. | % | No. | % | No. | % |
|---|---|---|---|---|---|---|
| 2024 | 440 | 60.52% | 268 | 36.86% | 19 | 2.61% |
| 2018 | 374 | 63.07% | 199 | 33.56% | 20 | 3.37% |
| 2012 | 376 | 53.18% | 297 | 42.01% | 34 | 4.81% |
| 2006 | 316 | 54.39% | 247 | 42.51% | 18 | 3.10% |

United States Senate election results for Mannington Township2
| Year | Republican | | Democratic | | Third party(ies) | |
| Year | No. | % | No. | % | No. | % |
|---|---|---|---|---|---|---|
| 2020 | 468 | 60.47% | 286 | 36.95% | 20 | 2.58% |
| 2014 | 254 | 55.34% | 188 | 40.96% | 17 | 3.70% |
| 2013 | 169 | 63.30% | 98 | 36.70% | 0 | 0.00% |
| 2008 | 359 | 48.91% | 351 | 47.82% | 24 | 3.27% |

== Education ==
The Mannington Township School District serves public school students in pre-kindergarten through eighth grade at Mannington Township School. As of the 2023–24 school year, the district, comprised of one school, had an enrollment of 163 students and 19.0 classroom teachers (on an FTE basis), for a student–teacher ratio of 8.6:1. In the 2016–17 school year, Mannington had the 31st smallest enrollment of any school district in the state, with 158 students.

Public school students in ninth through twelfth grades attend Salem High School in Salem City, together with students from Elsinboro Township, Lower Alloways Creek Township and Quinton Township, as part of a sending/receiving relationship with the Salem City School District. As of the 2023–24 school year, the high school had an enrollment of 387 students and 40.0 classroom teachers (on an FTE basis), for a student–teacher ratio of 9.7:1.

== Infrastructure ==
=== Transportation ===
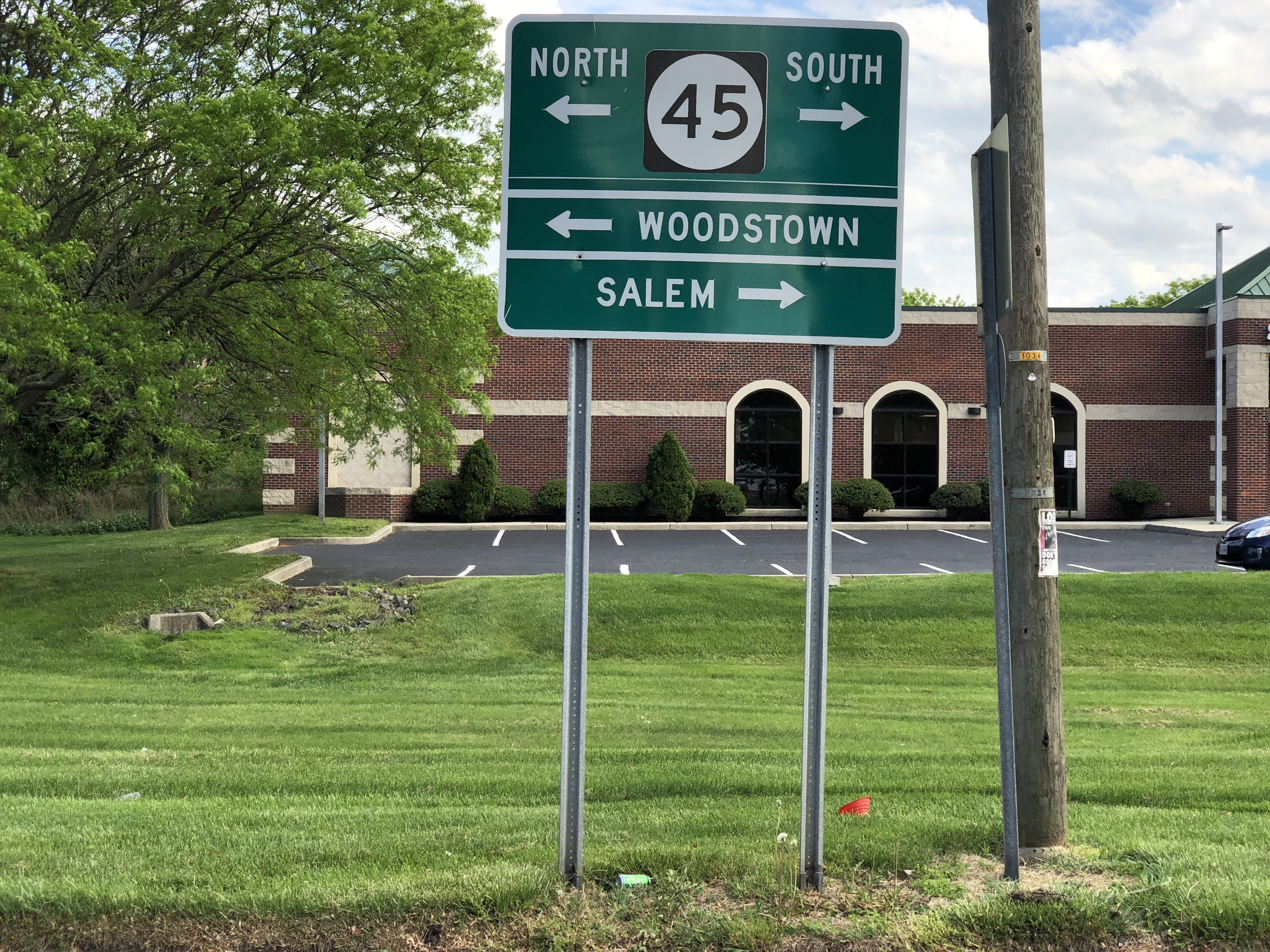
Road sign on County Route 540 at the Pointers

==== Roads and highways ====
As of May 2010, the township had a total of 69.40 miles (111.69 km) of roadways, of which 30.42 miles (48.96 km) were maintained by the municipality, 32.36 miles (52.08 km) by Salem County and 6.62 miles (10.65 km) by the New Jersey Department of Transportation.

New Jersey Route 45 (Salem–Woodstown Road) is the main highway serving Mannington Township. County Route 540 (Pointers Auburn Road) also traverses the township. Their convergence with Pointers Sharptown Road (County Route 620) is named Pointers, or the Pointers, which "pointed" toward Salem.

==== Public transportation ====
NJ Transit provides bus service between Salem and Philadelphia on the 401, with local service between Penns Grove and Woodstown offered on the 468 route.

==== Freight rail ====
Once also providing passenger service, the 18.6 miles (29.9 km) southern portion of the freight rail Salem Branch operated under contract by Southern Railroad of New Jersey runs through Mannington, with Mannington Mills being one of the short line's major customers.

=== Health care ===
Salem Medical Center is a 126-bed hospital that was founded in 1919 and moved to Mannington Township in 1951. In 2017, New Jersey approved a plan to sell it to Prime Healthcare Foundation for $15 million.

== Notable people ==
People who were born in, residents of, or otherwise closely associated with Mannington Township include:

- Collins B. Allen (1866–1953), politician who served as President of the New Jersey Senate
- David Bailey (born 1967), politician who has represented the 3rd legislative district in the New Jersey General Assembly since 2024
- Robert Gibbon Johnson (1771–1850), gentleman farmer best known for the apocryphal story that he publicly ate a basket of tomatoes at the Old Salem County Courthouse in 1820 to demonstrate that they were not poisonous
- George Washington Nicholson (1832–1912), artist best known for his landscape portraits.
- Bethanne McCarthy Patrick (1970–2025), member of the New Jersey General Assembly since 2022 from the 3rd Legislative District
- Thomas A. Pankok (1931–2022), politician who served in the New Jersey General Assembly from 1982 to 1986, where he represented the 3rd Legislative District
