= Sinnickson, Virginia =

Unincorporated community in Virginia, United States

Coordinates: 37°59′10″N 75°25′46″W

Sinnickson is an unincorporated community in Accomack County, Virginia, United States.
