= Salem County Insane Asylum =

- U.S. National Register of Historic Places
- New Jersey Register of Historic Places
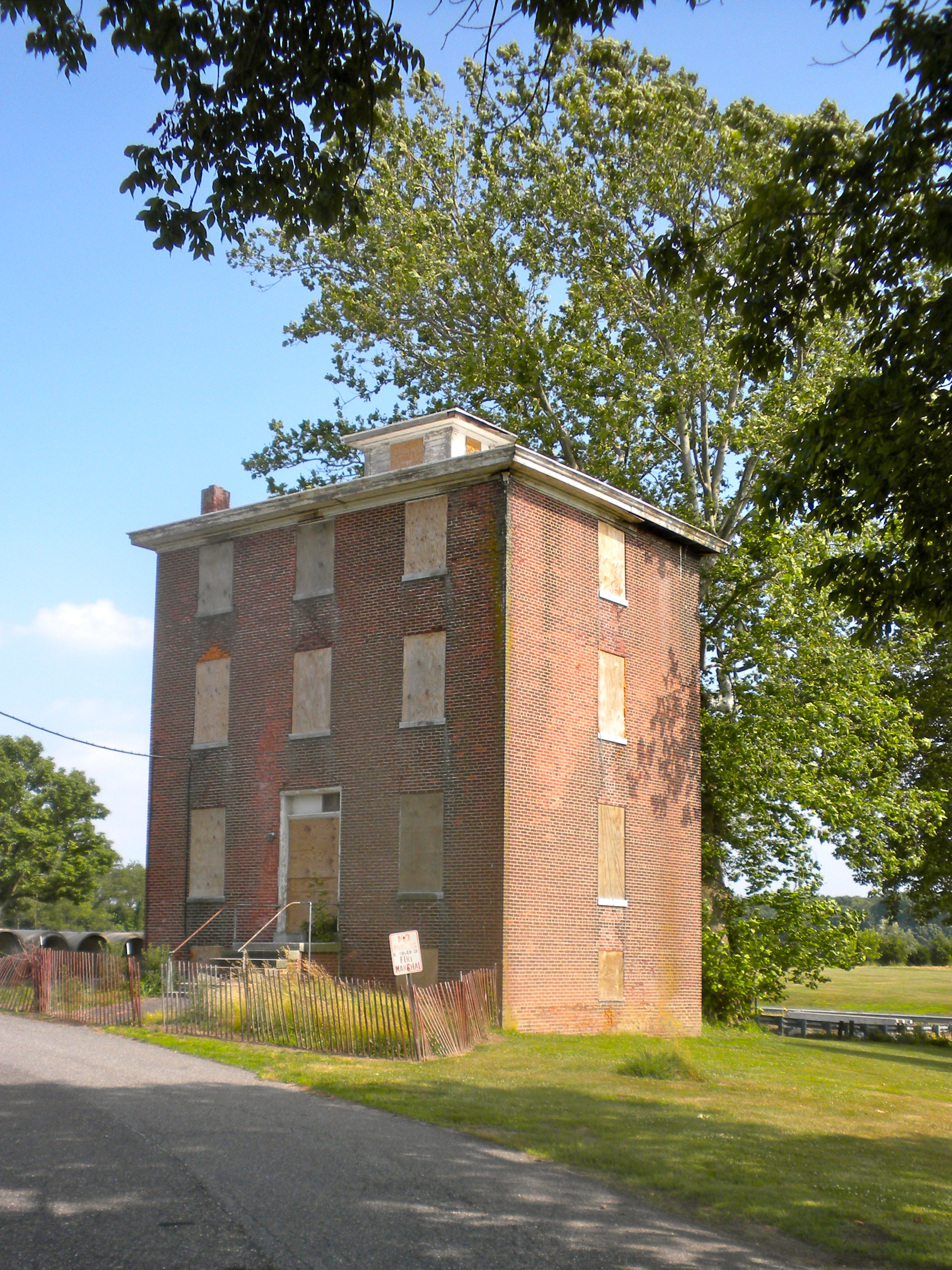

- Location within Salem County, New Jersey Location within New Jersey Location within the United States
- Location: 900 Route 45, Mannington Township, New Jersey
- Coordinates: 39.63008°N 75.36375°W
- Area: 9 acres (3.6 ha)
- Built: 1870
- Architect: Dunn, Wistar and Co.
- Architectural style: Italianate
- NRHP reference No.: 08000562
- NJRHP No.: 4343

Significant dates
- Added to NRHP: June 27, 2008
- Designated NJRHP: April 17, 2008

Salem County Insane Asylum is located in Mannington Township, Salem County, New Jersey, United States. The building was built in 1870 and was added to the National Register of Historic Places on June 27, 2008.

== See also ==
- National Register of Historic Places listings in Salem County, New Jersey
