= Clement Hall Sinnickson =

American politician (1834-1919)

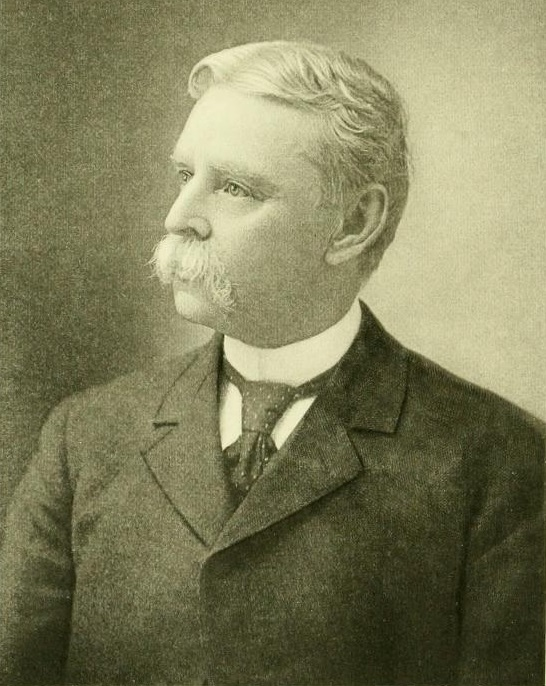
- From Volume I of 1900's Biographical, Genealogical and Descriptive History of the First Congressional District of New Jersey.

Member of the U.S. House of Representatives from New Jersey's 1st district
- In office March 4, 1875 – March 3, 1879
- Preceded by: John W. Hazelton
- Succeeded by: George M. Robeson

Personal details
- Born: September 16, 1834 Salem, New Jersey
- Died: July 24, 1919 (aged 84) Salem, New Jersey
- Party: Republican

Clement Hall Sinnickson (September 16, 1834 – July 24, 1919), was an American Republican Party politician, who served in the United States House of Representatives, where he represented New Jersey's 1st congressional district from 1875 to 1879. He is the grandnephew of Thomas Sinnickson, who was also a former Representative from New Jersey.

Born in Salem, New Jersey, he attended private schools, and the Rensselaer Polytechnic Institute, before graduating from Union College, New York, in 1855. While at Union he became a member of Theta Delta Chi. After his collegiate career, he studied law, and was admitted to the bar in 1858, commencing the practice of law in Salem. During the Civil War Sinnickson served as Captain in the Union Army. He was elected as a Republican to the Forty-fourth and Forty-fifth United States Congresses, serving in office from March 4, 1875, to March 3, 1879. After his stint in Washington, he resumed the practice of law in Salem. He also served as a delegate to the 1880 Republican National Convention, and he was appointed judge of the Court of Common Pleas in 1896 and reappointed in 1901 and 1906.

Sinnickson died in Salem, New Jersey on July 24, 1919, and was interred at St. John's Episcopal Cemetery.

U.S. House of Representatives
Preceded by John W. Hazelton	Member of the U.S. House of Representatives from New Jersey's 1st congressional district March 4, 1875 – March 3, 1879	Succeeded by George M. Robeson
