= Salem, New Jersey =

City in Salem County, New Jersey, US

- City
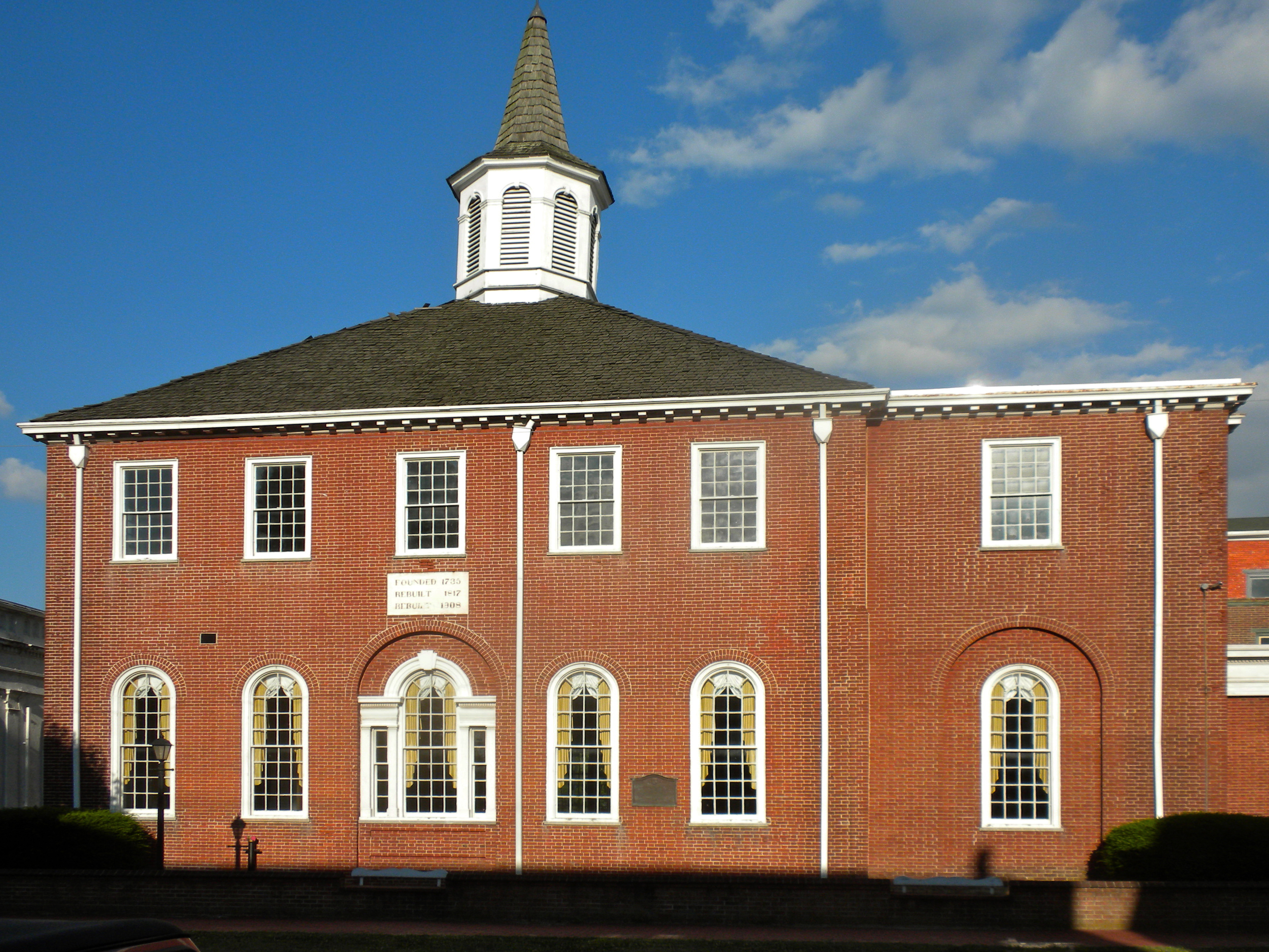
- The Old Salem County Courthouse

- Seal

- Location of Salem in Salem County, New Jersey

- Location in Salem County Location in New Jersey Location in the United States
- Coordinates: 39.568236°N 75.472553°W
- Country: United States
- State: New Jersey
- County: Salem
- Formed: October 1675
- Incorporated: February 21, 1798 (as township)
- Incorporated: February 25, 1858 (as city)

Government
  - Type: City
  - Body: City Council
  - Mayor: Jody Veler (D, term ends December 31, 2024)
  - Municipal clerk: Ben Angeli

Area
  - Total: 2.81 sq mi (7.29 km^{2})
  - Land: 2.34 sq mi (6.07 km^{2})
  - Water: 0.47 sq mi (1.22 km^{2}) 16.73%
  - Rank: 353rd of 565 in state 12th of 15 in county
- Elevation: 10 ft (3.0 m)

Population (2020)
  - Total: 5,296
  - Estimate (2023): 5,325
  - Rank: 371st of 565 in state 4th of 15 in county
  - Density: 2,259.4/sq mi (872.4/km^{2})
  - Rank: 278th of 565 in state 3rd of 15 in county
- Time zone: UTC−05:00 (Eastern (EST))
  - Summer (DST): UTC−04:00 (Eastern (EDT))
- ZIP Code: 08079
- Area code: 856 exchanges 339, 878, 935
- FIPS code: 3403365490
- GNIS feature ID: 0885385
- Website: cityofsalemnj.gov

Salem is a city in and the county seat of Salem County, the most rural county in the U.S. state of New Jersey. The name Salem, for both the city and county, is derived from the Hebrew word shalom, meaning peace. As of the 2020 United States census, the city's population was 5,296, an increase of 150 (+2.9%) from the 2010 census count of 5,146, which in turn reflected a decrease of 711 (−12.1%) from the 5,857 counted in the 2000 census. Salem is part of the Philadelphia metropolitan area.

The town and colony of Salem was laid out in 1675 by John Fenwick and the community was given permission to choose officers in October 1693. It was incorporated on February 21, 1798, as part of the initial group of 104 townships established by the New Jersey Legislature. On February 25, 1858, it was reincorporated as Salem City.

Salem had the second-highest property tax rate in New Jersey, with an equalized rate of 6.519% in 2020, compared to 3.476% in Salem County and a statewide average of 2.279%.

== History ==
Salem was founded by John Fenwick, a Quaker. Fenwick had been involved in a financial dispute with Edward Byllynge, another Quaker, who had received the undivided portion of New Jersey territory that James Stuart, Duke of York had granted to Lord John Berkeley in 1664. Berkeley had sold his share to Byllynge in 1675 for 1,000 pounds, but Byllynge had become bankrupt and had the property transferred to Fenwick to hold in trust for Byllynge and his assigns. Fenwick and Byllynge subsequently disagreed over ownership and control of the property.

William Penn was asked to adjudicate the matter, and he awarded 90% of the claim to Byllynge and the remaining 10% to Fenwick, along with a cash settlement for his share. Fenwick was dissatisfied with Penn's judgement and refused to abide by the decision. Essentially, Fenwick had no assurance that a man who had previously gone bankrupt would convey 10% of the net proceeds of the future venture, particularly since Byllynge had not even paid the adjudicated cash settlement. Fenwick therefore organized a colony of settlers and sailed to the Delaware Bay where he settled as patroon on the eastern shore near the abandoned Swedish settlement of Fort Nya Elfsborg. There he established himself as the local governor of the Fifth Tenth (approximately 20% of the original Byllynge property), issuing land patents and enforcing his own laws in defiance of Byllynge and Penn.

Byllynge countered by suing Fenwick, creating uncertainty over the chain of land title. The economic damages suffered by those who controlled property in and around Salem caused many affected individuals over the following decade to file numerous complaints and lawsuits in the colonial courts. To preserve Salem, its inhabitants and their property, Fenwick remained under arrest for months until copies of documents supporting his claims were obtained from England. The court of Dominion Governor Andros ultimately upheld Fenwick's claim, and he returned to govern the Salem tenth by 1689. Salem remained as a settlement and continued to grow. In October 1693, the community was given permission to choose its own officers.

During the American Revolutionary War, British forces under Lieutenant-Colonel Charles Mawhood launched a raid on Salem on March 18, 1778. Mawhood's troops surprised and defeated a force of American militia at a nearby bridge, and Mawhood threatened to burn Salem if the town's garrison refused to surrender. American Colonel Asher Holmes threatened to terrorize local Loyalists in retaliation if Mawhood carried out his threats, which led the latter to back down. However, on March 21 Major John Graves Simcoe led 300 troops of the 27th Regiment of Foot and Queen's Rangers in a surprise attack on Hancock House, where they killed between 20 and 30 American militiamen who were sleeping there. Simcoe's troops, reportedly exclaiming "Spare no one! Give no quarter!", allegedly killed several militiamen who were attempting to surrender and fatally injured Loyalist judge William Hancock Jr., the owner of Hancock House before American troops commandeered it. After the war ended in 1783, treason trials were held at the county courthouse where suspected Loyalists were tried for allegedly aiding the British during the raid on Salem. Four men were convicted and sentenced to death for treason, but they were pardoned by Governor William Livingston and exiled from New Jersey.

Salem was formally incorporated on February 21, 1798, as one of 104 townships initially established by the New Jersey Legislature under the Township Act of 1798.

The Old Salem County Courthouse is associated with the legend that Colonel Robert Gibbon Johnson proved the edibility of the tomato. According to the legend, Colonel Johnson stood upon the courthouse steps in 1820 and ate tomatoes in front of a large, astonished crowd assembled to watch him do so. However, the legend did not appear in print until 1948 and modern scholars question its historical accuracy.

On February 25, 1858, Salem was reincorporated as Salem City.

=== Historical buildings ===
The Old Salem County Courthouse now houses the administrative offices of Salem City. It is the oldest courthouse in New Jersey still in active use and the second-oldest courthouse in continuous use in the United States. Built in 1735 during the reign of King George II, the courthouse was constructed of locally manufactured bricks. It was enlarged in 1817 and enlarged and remodeled again in 1908, but its distinctive bell tower remains essentially unchanged, and the original bell is still displayed in the courtroom.

== Geography ==
Salem is located along the Salem River. According to the United States Census Bureau, the city had a total area of 2.81 square miles (7.29 km^{2}), including 2.34 square miles (6.07 km^{2}) of land and 0.47 square miles (1.22 km^{2}) of water (16.73%).

The city borders the Salem County municipalities of Elsinboro Township, Lower Alloways Creek Township, Mannington Township, Pennsville Township and Quinton Township.

=== Climate ===
The climate in the area is characterized by hot, humid summers and generally mild to cool winters. According to the Köppen Climate Classification system, Salem has a humid subtropical climate, abbreviated "Cfa" on climate maps.

== Demographics ==
Historical population
Census	Pop.	Note	%±
1810	929		—
1820	1,303		40.3%
1830	1,570		20.5%
1840	2,006		27.8%
1850	3,052		52.1%
1860	3,865		26.6%
1870	4,555		17.9%
1880	5,056		11.0%
1890	5,516		9.1%
1900	5,811		5.3%
1910	6,614		13.8%
1920	7,435		12.4%
1930	8,047		8.2%
1940	8,618		7.1%
1950	9,050		5.0%
1960	8,941		−1.2%
1970	7,648		−14.5%
1980	6,959		−9.0%
1990	6,883		−1.1%
2000	5,857		−14.9%
2010	5,146		−12.1%
2020	5,296		2.9%
2023 (est.)	5,325		0.5%
Population sources: 1810–2000; 1810–1920 1840 1830–1870; 1850 1870 1880–1890; 1890–1910 1910–1930; 1940–2000 2000; 2010 2020

=== Racial and ethnic composition ===
Salem city, New Jersey – Racial and ethnic composition Note: the US Census treats Hispanic/Latino as an ethnic category. This table excludes Latinos from the racial categories and assigns them to a separate category. Hispanics/Latinos may be of any race.
Race / Ethnicity (NH = Non-Hispanic)	Pop 2000	Pop 2010	Pop 2020	% 2000	% 2010	% 2020
White alone (NH)	2,101	1,515	1,290	35.87%	29.44%	24.36%
Black or African American alone (NH)	3,260	3,087	3,098	55.66%	59.99%	58.50%
Native American or Alaska Native alone (NH)	24	20	8	0.41%	0.39%	0.15%
Asian alone (NH)	14	19	29	0.24%	0.37%	0.55%
Pacific Islander alone (NH)	0	0	0	0.00%	0.00%	0.00%
Some Other Race alone (NH)	9	8	33	0.15%	0.16%	0.62%
Mixed Race or Multi-Racial (NH)	163	153	220	2.78%	2.97%	4.15%
Hispanic or Latino (any race)	286	344	618	4.88%	6.68%	11.67%
Total	5,857	5,146	5,296	100.00%	100.00%	100.00%

=== 2020 census ===
As of the 2020 census, Salem had a population of 5,296. The median age was 33.3 years. 30.2% of residents were under the age of 18 and 14.2% of residents were 65 years of age or older. For every 100 females there were 79.4 males, and for every 100 females age 18 and over there were 72.8 males age 18 and over.

98.7% of residents lived in urban areas, while 1.3% lived in rural areas.

There were 2,093 households in Salem, of which 37.3% had children under the age of 18 living in them. Of all households, 19.9% were married-couple households, 19.7% were households with a male householder and no spouse or partner present, and 51.0% were households with a female householder and no spouse or partner present. About 34.0% of all households were made up of individuals and 13.2% had someone living alone who was 65 years of age or older.

There were 2,467 housing units, of which 15.2% were vacant. The homeowner vacancy rate was 7.0% and the rental vacancy rate was 8.6%.

=== 2010 census ===
The 2010 United States census counted 5,146 people, 2,157 households, and 1,264 families in the city. The population density was 2,195.9 inhabitants per square mile (847.8/km^{2}). There were 2,633 housing units at an average density of 1,123.6 per square mile (433.8/km^{2}). The racial makeup was 31.21% (1,606) White, 62.13% (3,197) Black or African American, 0.41% (21) Native American, 0.39% (20) Asian, 0.00% (0) Pacific Islander, 1.85% (95) from other races, and 4.02% (207) from two or more races. Hispanic or Latino of any race were 6.68% (344) of the population.

Of the 2,157 households, 28.9% had children under the age of 18; 22.8% were married couples living together; 30.7% had a female householder with no husband present and 41.4% were non-families. Of all households, 35.5% were made up of individuals and 12.7% had someone living alone who was 65 years of age or older. The average household size was 2.36 and the average family size was 3.05.

28.2% of the population were under the age of 18, 9.7% from 18 to 24, 22.4% from 25 to 44, 27.1% from 45 to 64, and 12.5% who were 65 years of age or older. The median age was 34.4 years. For every 100 females, the population had 80.8 males. For every 100 females ages 18 and older there were 73.5 males.

The Census Bureau's 2006–2010 American Community Survey showed that (in 2010 inflation-adjusted dollars) median household income was $25,682 (with a margin of error of +/− $5,287) and the median family income was $38,286 (+/− $5,682). Males had a median income of $47,708 (+/− $9,641) versus $32,236 (+/− $5,778) for females. The per capita income for the borough was $17,733 (+/− $2,366). About 26.5% of families and 28.4% of the population were below the poverty line, including 43.4% of those under age 18 and 10.9% of those age 65 or over.

=== 2000 census ===
As of the 2000 U.S. census, there were 5,857 people, 2,383 households, and 1,463 families residing in the city. The population density was 2,244.3 inhabitants per square mile (866.5/km^{2}). There were 2,863 housing units at an average density of 1,097.0 per square mile (423.6/km^{2}). The racial makeup of the city was 37.46% White, 56.77% African American, 0.60% Native American, 0.24% Asian, 1.38% from other races, and 3.55% from two or more races. Hispanic or Latino of any race were 4.88% of the population.

There were 2,383 households, out of which 32.9% had children under the age of 18 living with them, 27.7% were married couples living together, 29.0% had a female householder with no husband present, and 38.6% were non-families. 34.1% of all households were made up of individuals, and 14.2% had someone living alone who was 65 years of age or older. The average household size was 2.43 and the average family size was 3.10.

The population was spread out, with 31.0% under the age of 18, 9.1% from 18 to 24, 25.4% from 25 to 44, 20.6% from 45 to 64, and 14.0% who were 65 years of age or older. The median age was 34 years. For every 100 females, there were 80.7 males. For every 100 females age 18 and over, there were 73.6 males.

The median income for a household in the city was $25,846, and the median income for a family was $29,699. Males had a median income of $35,389 versus $24,354 for females. The per capita income for the city was $13,559. About 24.7% of families and 26.6% of the population were below the poverty line, including 35.3% of those under age 18 and 12.1% of those age 65 or over.

== Government ==
Gubernatorial election results for Salem
Year	Republican		Democratic		Third party(ies)	
Year	No.	%	No.	%	No.	%
2025	200	21.95%	692	75.96%	19	2.09%
2021	207	26.71%	557	71.87%	11	1.42%
2017	190	22.84%	605	72.72%	37	4.45%
2013	399	41.01%	538	55.29%	36	3.70%
2009	241	22.31%	731	67.69%	108	10.00%
2005	274	22.74%	889	73.78%	42	3.49%

United States presidential election results for Salem 2024 2020 2016 2012 2008 2004
Year	Republican		Democratic		Third party(ies)	
Year	No.	%	No.	%	No.	%
2024	334	23.64%	1,057	74.81%	22	1.56%
2020	344	19.40%	1,414	79.75%	15	0.85%
2016	328	19.55%	1,307	77.89%	43	2.56%
2012	309	15.40%	1,674	83.41%	24	1.20%
2008	390	19.09%	1,635	80.03%	18	0.88%
2004	506	28.30%	1,266	70.81%	16	0.89%

United States Senate election results for Salem1
Year	Republican		Democratic		Third party(ies)	
Year	No.	%	No.	%	No.	%
2024	284	20.39%	1,040	74.66%	69	4.95%
2018	253	21.35%	862	72.74%	70	5.91%
2012	258	13.58%	1,563	82.26%	79	4.16%
2006	317	26.80%	815	68.89%	51	4.31%

United States Senate election results for Salem2
Year	Republican		Democratic		Third party(ies)	
Year	No.	%	No.	%	No.	%
2020	298	16.86%	1,415	80.03%	55	3.11%
2014	165	16.84%	781	79.69%	34	3.47%
2013	125	22.77%	417	75.96%	7	1.28%
2008	349	17.78%	1,488	75.80%	126	6.42%

=== Local government ===
Salem is governed under the City form of New Jersey municipal government. The city is one of 15 municipalities (of the 564) statewide that use this form of government. The government is comprised of the Mayor and the eight-member City Council. The mayor is elected at-large to a three-year term of office. The City Council is comprised of eight members, with four members representing one of two wards, East and West. Council members are elected to four-year terms of office on a staggered basis, with one seat from each ward up for election each year. All members of the governing body are chosen on a partisan basis as part of the November general election.

As of 2022, the Mayor of Salem is Democrat Jody Veler, whose term of office ends December 31, 2024. Members of the City Council are Council President Earl R. Gage (D, 2022; West Ward), Council President Pro Tempore Timothy H. Gregory Jr. (D, 2022; East Ward), Sharen A. Cline (D, 2024, East Ward), Robert L. Davis (D, 2023; East Ward), Vaughn Groce (D, 2025, East Ward), Sharon K. Kellum (D, 2024, West Ward), Gail Slaughter (D, 2023; West Ward) and James W. Smith (D, 2025; West Ward).

Ruth Carter was named in October 2013 to fill the seat vacated in the previous month by Bob Johnson, who resigned due to family obligations. Carter served on an interim basis until the November 2014 general election, when she was elected to fill the balance of the term of office through December 2016. Vaughn Groce was chosen in January 2013 to fill the seat of Charles Washington Jr., expiring in December 2013 that was vacated when he took office as mayor.

=== Federal, state, and county representation ===
Salem City is located in the 2nd Congressional District and is part of New Jersey's 3rd state legislative district.

For the 119th United States Congress, New Jersey's 2nd congressional district is represented by Jeff Van Drew (R, Dennis Township). New Jersey is represented in the United States Senate by Democrats Cory Booker (Newark, term ends 2027) and Andy Kim (Moorestown, term ends 2031).

For the 2026–2027 session, the 3rd legislative district of the New Jersey Legislature is represented in the State Senate by John Burzichelli (D, Paulsboro) and in the General Assembly by David Bailey (D, Woodstown) and Heather Simmons (D, Glassboro).

Salem County is governed by a five-member Board of County Commissioners who are elected at-large to serve three-year terms of office on a staggered basis, with either one or two seats coming up for election each year. At an annual reorganization meeting held in the beginning of January, the board selects a Director and a Deputy Director from among its members. As of 2025, Salem County's Commissioners (with party, residence, and term-end year listed in parentheses) are:

Director Benjamin H. Laury (R, Elmer, 2027), Deputy Director Cordy Taylor (R, Oldmans Township, 2028), Paul Collier (R, Lower Alloways Creek, 2027), Ed Ramsey (R, Pittsgrove Township, 2026), and Daniel Timmerman (R, Elmer, 2028).

Constitutional officers elected on a countywide basis are: Clerk Dale A. Cross (R, Pennsville Township, 2029), Sheriff Charles M. Miller (R, Salem, 2027) and Surrogate Gordon J. Ostrum Jr. (R, Pilesgrove Township, 2030).

=== Politics ===
As of March 2011, there were a total of 2,975 registered voters in Salem, of whom 1,502 (50.5% vs. 30.6% countywide) were registered as Democrats, 229 (7.7% vs. 21.0%) were registered as Republicans and 1,244 (41.8% vs. 48.4%) were registered as Unaffiliated. There were no voters registered to other parties. Among the city's 2010 Census population, 57.8% (vs. 64.6% in Salem County) were registered to vote, including 80.5% of those ages 18 and over (vs. 84.4% countywide).

In the 2012 presidential election, Democrat Barack Obama received 83.4% of the vote (1,674 cast), ahead of Republican Mitt Romney with 15.4% (309 votes), and other candidates with 1.2% (24 votes), among the 2,022 ballots cast by the city's 3,322 registered voters (15 ballots were spoiled), for a turnout of 60.9%. In the 2008 presidential election, Democrat Barack Obama received 1,635 votes (78.8% vs. 50.4% countywide), ahead of Republican John McCain with 390 votes (18.8% vs. 46.6%) and other candidates with 18 votes (0.9% vs. 1.6%), among the 2,074 ballots cast by the city's 3,141 registered voters, for a turnout of 66.0% (vs. 71.8% in Salem County). In the 2004 presidential election, Democrat John Kerry received 1,266 votes (70.4% vs. 45.9% countywide), ahead of Republican George W. Bush with 506 votes (28.1% vs. 52.5%) and other candidates with 16 votes (0.9% vs. 1.0%), among the 1,799 ballots cast by the city's 2,957 registered voters, for a turnout of 60.8% (vs. 71.0% in the whole county).

In the 2013 gubernatorial election, Democrat Barbara Buono received 55.3% of the vote (538 cast), ahead of Republican Chris Christie with 41.0% (399 votes), and other candidates with 3.7% (36 votes), among the 1,061 ballots cast by the city's 3,201 registered voters (88 ballots were spoiled), for a turnout of 33.1%. In the 2009 gubernatorial election, Democrat Jon Corzine received 731 ballots cast (66.3% vs. 39.9% countywide), ahead of Republican Chris Christie with 241 votes (21.8% vs. 46.1%), Independent Chris Daggett with 73 votes (6.6% vs. 9.7%) and other candidates with 35 votes (3.2% vs. 2.0%), among the 1,103 ballots cast by the city's 3,101 registered voters, yielding a 35.6% turnout (vs. 47.3% in the county).

== Education ==
The Salem City School District serves public school students in pre-kindergarten through twelfth grade. The district is one of 31 former Abbott districts statewide that were established pursuant to the decision by the New Jersey Supreme Court in Abbott v. Burke which are now referred to as "SDA Districts" based on the requirement for the state to cover all costs for school building and renovation projects in these districts under the supervision of the New Jersey Schools Development Authority.

As of the 2021–22 school year, the district, comprised of three schools, had an enrollment of 1,226 students and 99.0 classroom teachers (on an FTE basis), for a student–teacher ratio of 12.4:1. Schools in the district (with 2021–22 enrollment data from the National Center for Education Statistics) are John Fenwick Academy with 358 students in grades PreK-2, Salem Middle School with 444 students in grades 3-8, and Salem High School with 399 students in grades 9-12.

Public school students from Elsinboro, Lower Alloways Creek Township, Mannington Township and Quinton Township attend the district's high school for grades 9–12 as part of sending/receiving relationships.

The Catholic K–8 school St. Mary Regional School of the Roman Catholic Diocese of Camden closed in 2000, with students redirected to Bishop Guilfoyle Regional Catholic School in Carneys Point, which in turn closed in 2010. Guardian Angels Regional School is a K-8 school that operates under the auspices of the Diocese of Camden and accepts students from Salem. Its PreK-3 campus is in Gibbstown while its 4-8 campus is in Paulsboro.

Salem Community College is in nearby Carneys Point Township.

== Transportation ==
The Port of Salem was designated by the British Crown in 1682 as a port of entry on the Salem River accessible via the Delaware River. It handles a variety of bulk cargo, notably of construction aggregate, break bulk cargo, and containers for clothing, fishing apparel, agricultural produce, and other consumer goods. South Jersey Port Corporation operates the Salem Terminal on a 22-acre complex located west of downtown.

Extending for 1.2 miles (1.9 km), the Glass House Spur of the Salem Branch begins at the Port of Salem and is operated by the Southern Railroad of New Jersey with connections to Conrail's South Jersey/Philadelphia Shared Assets Area operations at Swedesboro.

=== Roads and highways ===
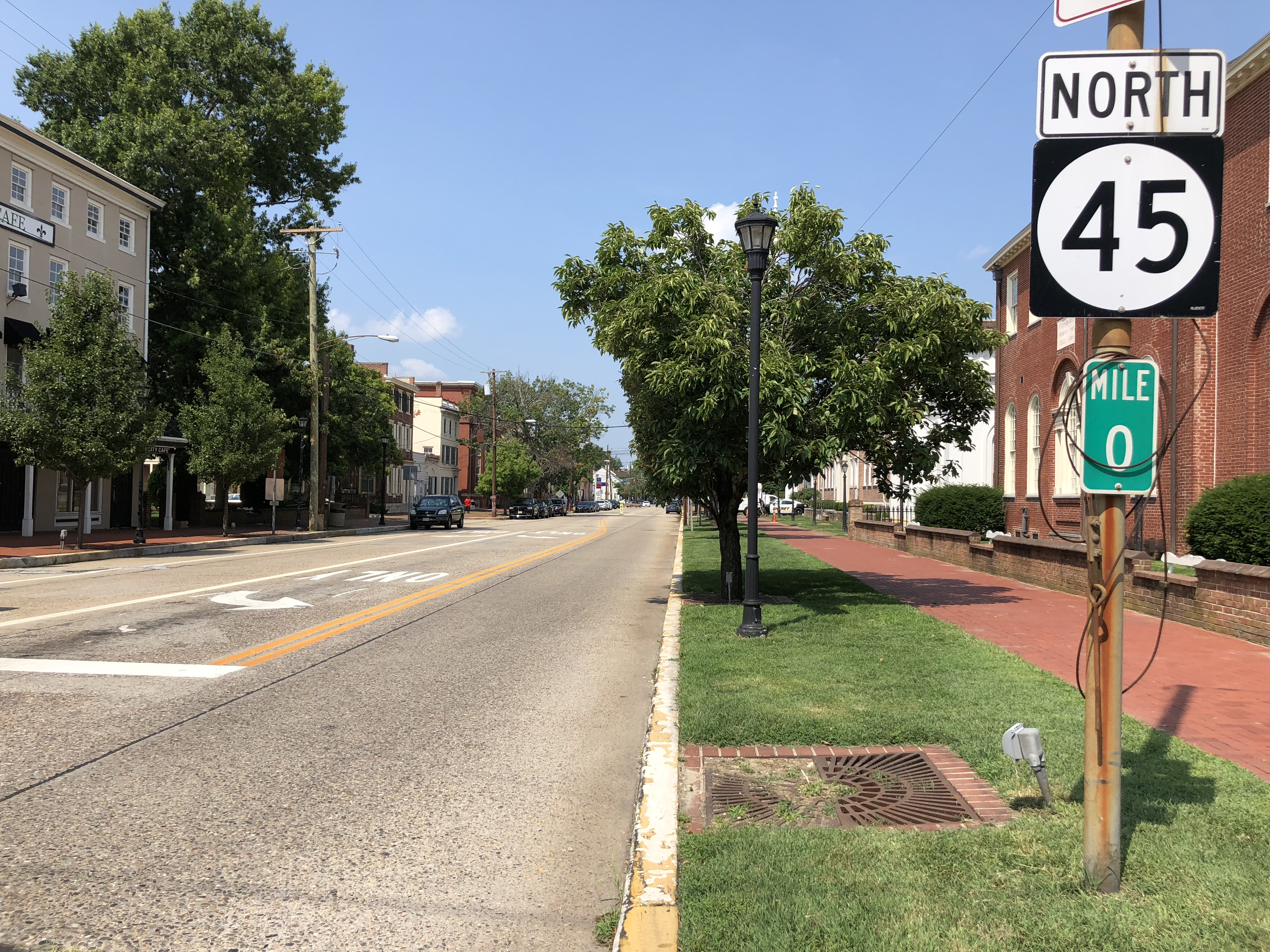
View north at the south end of Route 45 in Salem

As of May 2010, the city had a total of 24.79 miles (39.90 km) of roadways, of which 16.57 miles (26.67 km) were maintained by the municipality, 5.95 miles (9.58 km) by Salem County and 2.27 miles (3.65 km) by the New Jersey Department of Transportation.

State highways passing through Salem include Route 45, which has its southern terminus at its intersection with Route 49. Nearby highways and structures include Interstate 295, the New Jersey Turnpike and the Delaware Memorial Bridge.

=== Public transportation ===
NJ Transit offers bus service between the city and Philadelphia on the 401 route and local service on the 468 route.

The Delaware City–Salem Ferry was a seasonal service operating between Barber's Basin and Delaware City, Delaware, until it was rerouted to Fort Mott in 2015 and became the Forts Ferry Crossing.

== Notable people ==
People who were born in, residents of, or otherwise closely associated with Salem include:

- Forman S. Acton (1920–2014), computer scientist, engineer, educator and author
- Collins B. Allen (1866–1953), President of the New Jersey Senate
- Isaac Ambrose Barber (1852–1909), member of the United States House of Representatives from Maryland, serving from 1897 to 1899
- Ephraim Bee (1802–1888), pioneer, blacksmith, and inn-keeper of Doddridge County, West Virginia, which he represented in the West Virginia House of Delegates in 1863 and 1866–1867
- Benjamin H. Brewster (1816–1888), United States Attorney General from 1881 to 1885
- A. B. Brown (born 1965), running back who played for three seasons in the NFL with the New York Jets
- Alexander G. Cattell (1816–1894), United States Senator from New Jersey
- William Cassady Cattell (1827-1898), Presbyterian educator and seventh president of Lafayette College
- John Chowning (born 1934), musician, inventor and professor who developed FM synthesis
- Henry T. Ellett (1812–1887), member of the United States House of Representatives from Mississippi who died while delivering a welcome address for President Grover Cleveland
- Duke Esper (1868–1910), pitcher who played for nine professional seasons in Major League Baseball
- Gene Foster (born 1942), running back who played for six seasons for the San Diego Chargers
- Johnny Gaudreau (1993–2024), professional hockey player for the Calgary Flames and Columbus Blue Jackets of the NHL
- Goose Goslin (1900–1971), Hall of Fame Major League Baseball player
- William J. Hughes (1932–2019), represented New Jersey's 2nd congressional district in the United States House of Representatives
- Orlando Jordan (born 1974), retired professional wrestler, best known for his stint in WWE where he was a one-time United States Champion
- Anthony Quinton Keasbey (1824–1895), lawyer and poet, who served for 25 years as United States Attorney for the District of New Jersey
- Lydell Mitchell (born 1949), running back in the National Football League from 1972 to 1980
- Thomas A. Pankok (1931–2022), politician who served in the New Jersey General Assembly from 1982 to 1986, where he represented the 3rd Legislative District
- John R. Patrick (born 1945), business executive, author and innovative leader in the information technology industry
- Charles J. Pedersen (1904–1989), organic chemist and winner of the 1987 Nobel Prize in Chemistry
- John S. Rock (1826–1866), African-American doctor, dentist, abolitionist and lawyer
- Hetty Reckless (1776–1881), abolitionist
- Clement Hall Sinnickson (1834–1919), represented New Jersey's 1st congressional district from 1875 to 1879
- Alice Barber Stephens (1858–1932), painter and engraver, best remembered for her illustrations
- Jonathan Taylor (born 1999), running back for the Indianapolis Colts who set the New Jersey state record with 2,815 rushing yards as a senior at Salem High School
- John Test (1771–1849), member of the United States House of Representatives from Indiana who served from 1829 to 1831
- Hedge Thompson (1780–1828), represented New Jersey's at-large congressional district from 1827 until his death in 1828
- Edward Trenchard (1785–1824), captain of the United States Navy
- Jay Venuto (born 1958), former American football quarterback who played in the National Football League for the Baltimore Colts and the New York Jets, and in the United States Football League for the Birmingham Stallions
- John A. Waddington (1911–1981), politician who served as Majority Leader of the New Jersey Senate

== Photo gallery ==
Salem, New Jersey

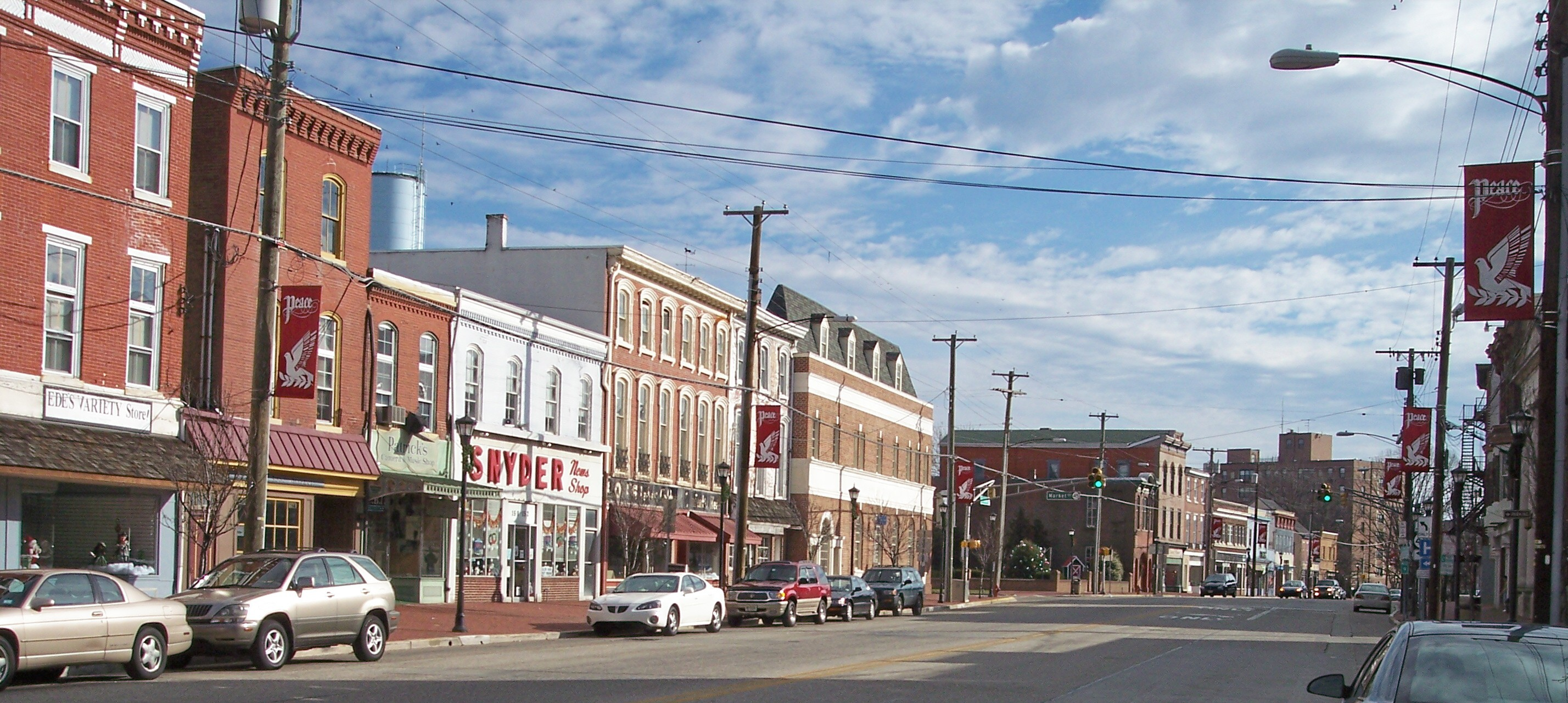
Broadway in downtown Salem in 2006

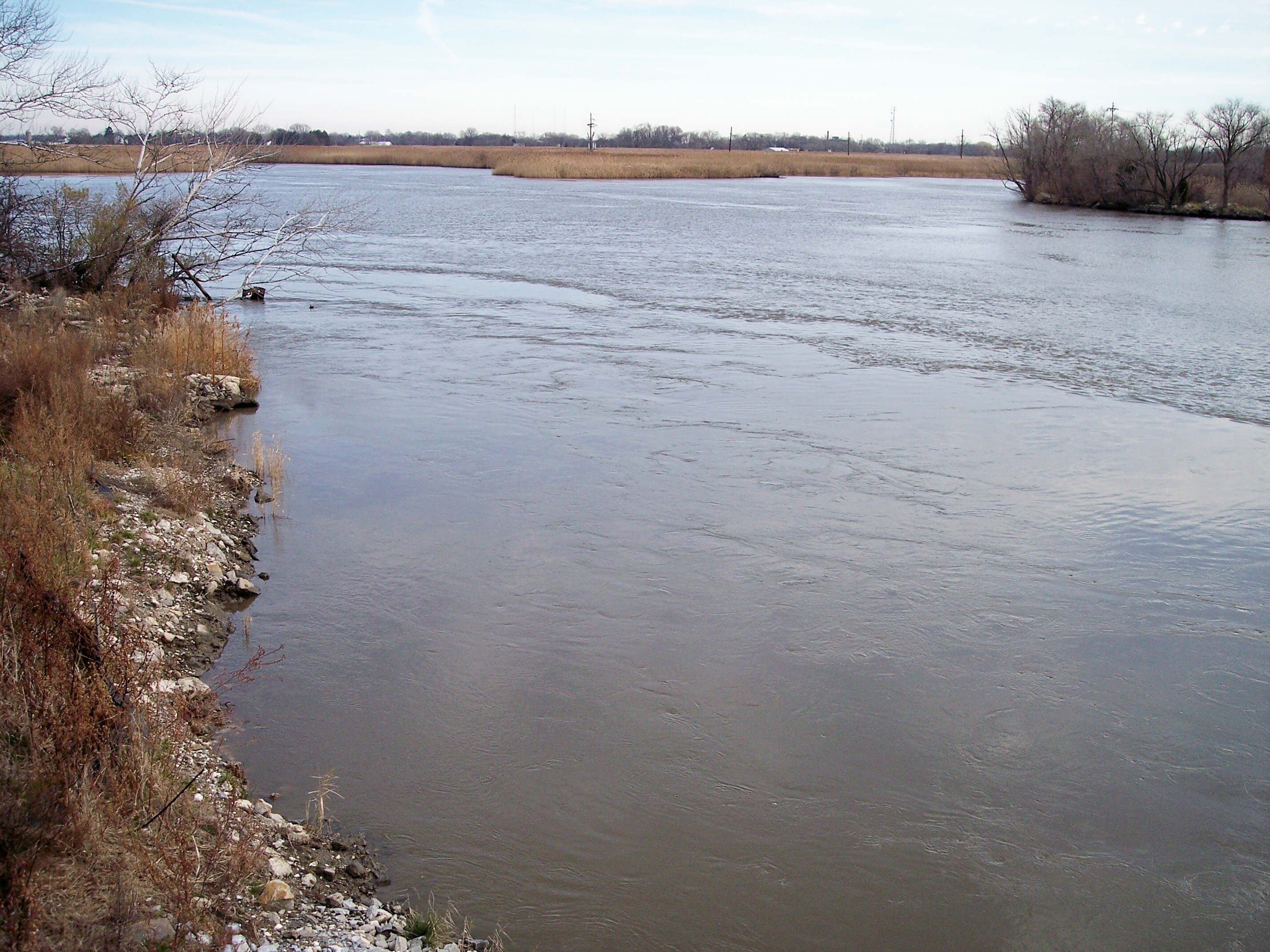
The Salem River in Salem in 2006

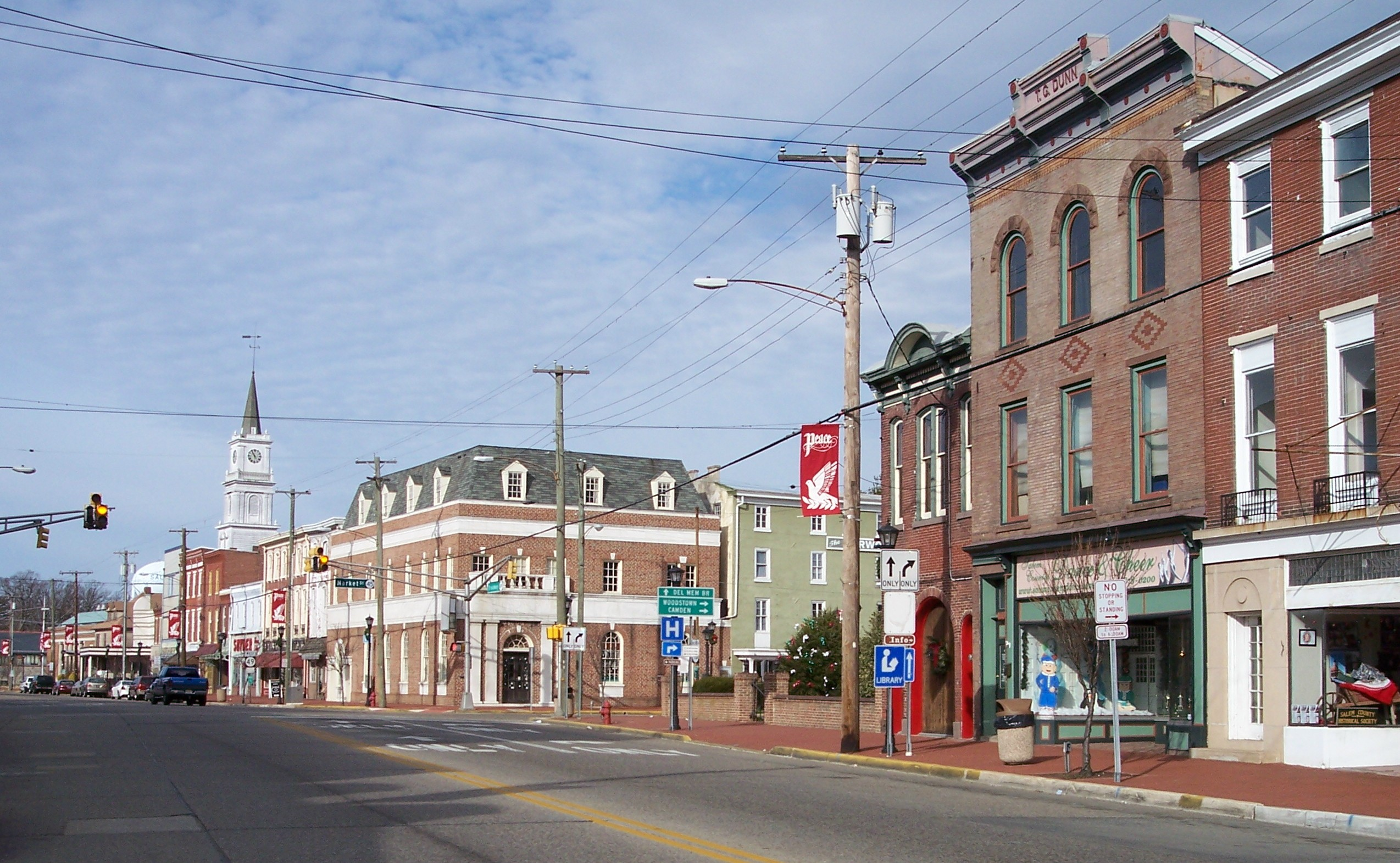
Broadway in downtown Salem in 2006

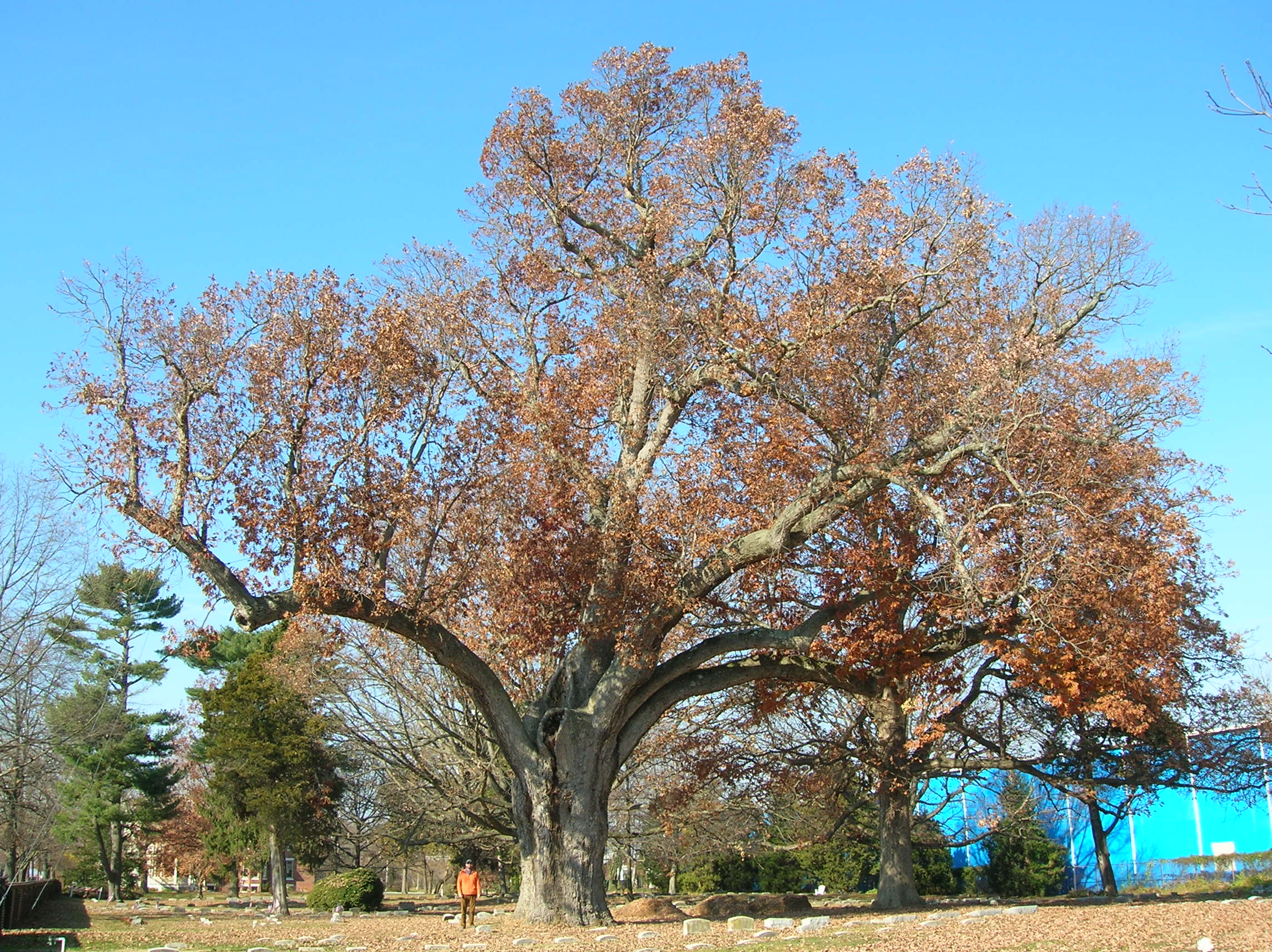
The historic Salem Oak, November 2012

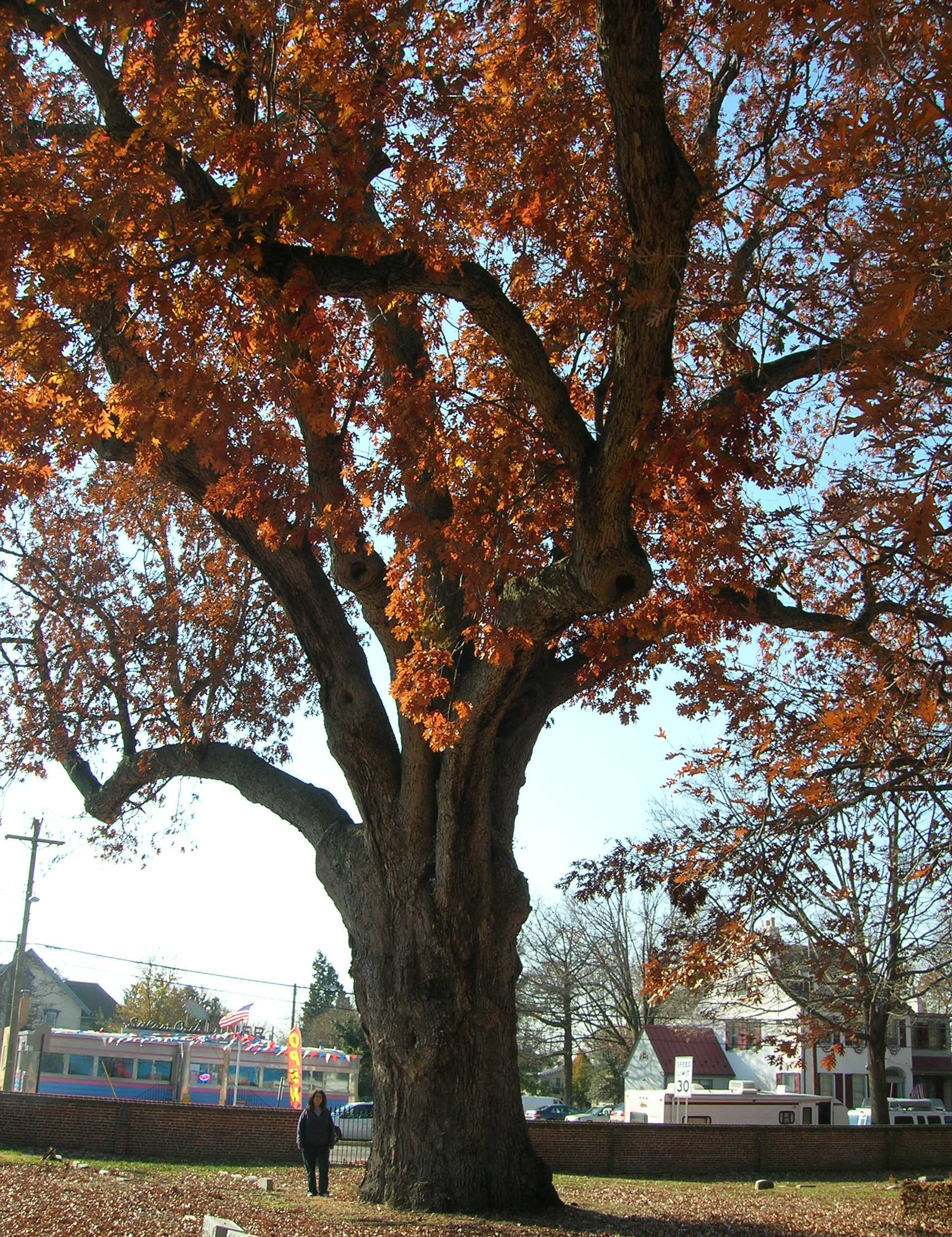
The historic Salem Oak, November 2012

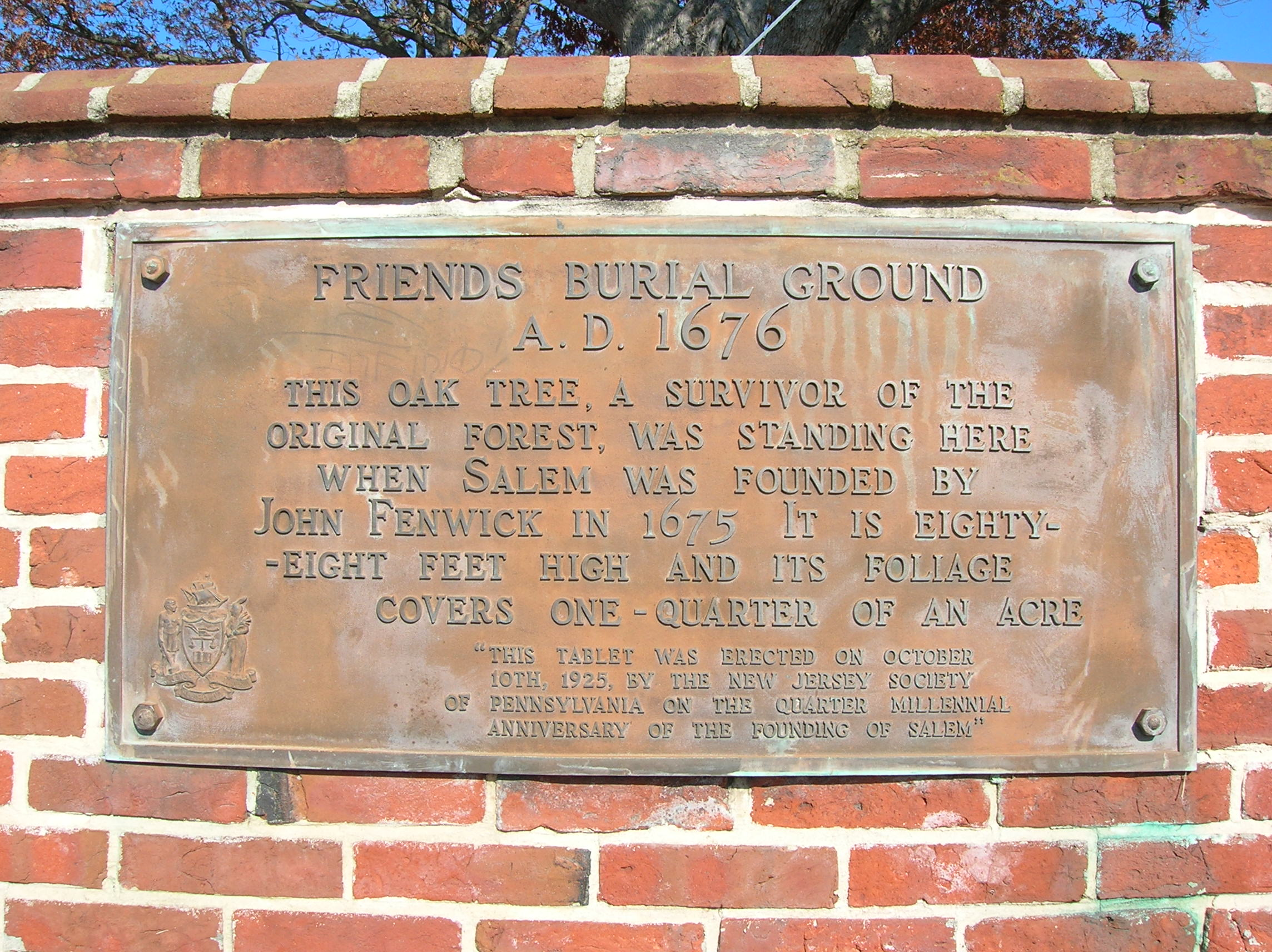
Salem Oak Commemorative Plaque, November 2012

== See also ==
- USS Salem (CM-11)

== Bibliography ==
- Shourds, Thomas (1876). History and Genealogy of Fenwick's Colony, New Jersey. Bridgeton, New Jersey: George F. Nixon, Publisher. ISBN 0-8063-0714-5 (reprint).
