= Hudson (surname) =

Origin
- Meaning: "son of Hugh"
- Region of origin: England

Hudson is an English surname. It means son of Hugh, as Hudd was a common nickname for Hugh. Notable people and characters with the surname include:

== A ==
- Alice Hudson (1947–2024), American librarian
- Amos Hudson (1918–1993), American politician
- Andrew Hudson (cricketer) (born 1965), South African test cricketer
- Austin Hudson, 1st Baronet (1897–1956), British Conservative politician

== B ==
- Ben Hudson (born 1979), Australian AFL player
- Betty Hudson (1931–2016), American politician
- Bill Hudson (disambiguation), several people
- Brett Hudson (born 1953), American musician, singer, and songwriter, one of the Hudson Brothers
- Bryan Hudson (born 1997), American professional baseball player

== C ==
- Charles Hudson (disambiguation), several people
- Chase Hudson (born 2002), American musician and social media influencer known professionally as Huddy (and formerly as Lil Huddy)
- Christie Brinkley (born 1954), American model, actress and entrepreneur whose birth name was Christie Lee Hudson but later adopted by the television writer Donald Brinkley

== D ==
- Dakota Hudson (born 1994), American baseball player
- Daniel Hudson (born 1987), American baseball player
- Dave Hudson (born 1974), American artist, musician, boxer and wrestler
- David Hudson (musician) (born 1962), Australian Aboriginal musician
- David Hudson (pioneer) (1761–1836), American businessman, founder of Hudson, Ohio
- Dawn Hudson (born c. 1957), American actress and movie executive, CEO of the Academy of Motion Picture Arts and Sciences
- Donna Hudson (born 1946), American biomedical engineer
- Donald Hudson, multiple people

== E ==
- Erasmus Darwin Hudson (1805–1880), American surgeon
- Erasmus Darwin Hudson Jr. (1843–1887), American physician, son of the above
- Erlund Hudson (1912–2011), British artist
- Ernie Hudson (born 1945), American actor and playwright

== F ==
- Fernando Tobias de Carvalho (born 1986), Brazilian footballer commonly known as Hudson
- Francisco Hudson (1826–1859), Chilean navy officer and hydrographer
- Frank Hudson, multiple people

== G ==
- Garth Hudson (1937–2025), Canadian musician
- Garth Hudson (footballer) (1923–2014), English footballer
- George Hudson (1800–1871), English railway financier
- George Vernon Hudson (1867–1946), New Zealand entomologist
- Grant M. Hudson (1868–1955), U.S. Representative from Michigan

== H ==
- Harold B. Hudson (1898–1982), Canadian flying ace
- Henry Hudson (died 1611), English sea explorer and navigator
- Henry Hudson (artist) (born 1982), British artist
- Henry E. Hudson (born 1947), United States district court judge for the Eastern District of Virginia
- Henry Louis Hudson (1898–1975), Canadian ice hockey player
- Henry Philerin Hudson (1798–1889), Irish music collector
- Hilda Phoebe Hudson (1881–1965), English mathematician
- Hosea Hudson (1898–1988), African-American labor leader and civil rights activist
- Hud Hudson, American philosopher
- Hugh Hudson (1937–2023), English film director

== J ==
- Jackie Hudson (1934–2011), American anti-nuclear proliferation and peace activist
- Jalen Hudson (born 1996), American basketball player in the Israeli Basketball Premier League
- James Hudson (disambiguation), multiple people
- Jeffrey Hudson (1619–1682), English dwarf in the court of Queen Henrietta Maria of England
- Jennifer Hudson (born 1981), American singer and actress
- Joe Hudson (disambiguation), several people
- John Hudson (disambiguation), several people
- Jordan Hudson (born 2003), American football player
- Jordon Hudson (born 2001), American pageant contestant
- Joseph Hudson (disambiguation), several people

== K ==
- Karl Hudson-Phillips (1933–2014), Trinidadian lawyer, judge of the International Criminal Court
- Kate Hudson (born 1979), American actress and singer
- Kate Hudson (activist) (born 1958), British academic and political activist
- Katheryn Hudson (Katy Perry) (born 1984), American singer
- Kathryn Hudson (born 1949), British civil servant and Parliamentary Commissioner for Standards
- Kerry Hudson (born 1980), Scottish writer
- Khaleke Hudson (born 1997), American football player
- Kirk Hudson (born 1986), English footballer
- Kobe Hudson (born 2001), American football player
- Kyle Hudson (born 1987), American baseball player and coach
- Kyron Hudson (born 2002), American football player

== L ==
- Lucy-Jo Hudson (born 1983), English actress

== M ==
- Manley Ottmer Hudson (1886–1960), American professor of international law, editor of the American Journal of International Law and judge on the Permanent Court of International Justice.
- Mark Hudson (footballer born 1980), English footballer currently with West Auckland Town AFC
- Mark Hudson (footballer born 1982), English footballer currently with Cardiff City
- Mark Hudson (musician) (born 1951), American record producer, musician, and songwriter, one of the Hudson Brothers
- Maurice Hudson (born 1930), English footballer
- Micah Hudson, American football player
- Michael Hudson (disambiguation), several people
- Miller Hudson, American politician
- Murray Ken Hudson (1938–1974), New Zealand soldier awarded the George Cross

== N ==
- Newt Hudson (1926–2014), American politician
- Noel Hudson (1893–1970), Anglican bishop
- Norman Hudson (born 1945), English publisher and advisor on historic houses

== O ==
- Ola Hudson (1946–2009), American fashion designer and costumier
- Oliver Hudson (born 1976), American actor
- Orlando Hudson (born 1977), American baseball player

== P ==
- Paul Hudson (Australian rules footballer) (born 1970), Australian Rules Football player
- Peter Hudson (born 1946), Australian Rules football player

== R ==
- Ralph Hudson, American murderer, in 1963 the last man to be executed in the State of New Jersey
- Ray Hudson (born 1955), English former football player and coach
- Regina Lynch-Hudson, American publicist and historian
- Richard Hudson (disambiguation), several people
- Robert Hudson, 1st Viscount Hudson (1886–1957), British politician
- Robert Hudson (broadcaster) (1920–2010), British broadcaster on cricket, rugby and state occasions
- Robert George Spencer Hudson (1895–1965), British geologist and paleontologist
- Robert H. Hudson (born 1938), American artist
- Robert Spear Hudson (1812–1884), British businessman who popularized dry soap powder
- Robert William Hudson, (1856–1937), his son, soap manufacturer
- Robin E. Hudson (born 1952), American judge, North Carolina Court of Appeals
- Rock Hudson (1925–1985), American actor
- Roger Hudson (cricketer) (born 1967), English cricketer
- Roger Hudson (sailor) (born 1978), South African sailor
- Roy Davage Hudson (born 1930), American neuropharmacologist and former president of Hampton University
- Ryan Hudson (born 1979), British rugby player

== S ==
- Samantha Hudson
- Sarah Hudson (singer) (born 1984), American singer-songwriter
- Saul Hudson (born 1965), English-American rock guitarist known as Slash, lead guitarist of the American band Guns N' Roses
- Scott Hudson (disambiguation), several people
- Shafiqah Hudson (1978–2024), American Black feminist

== T ==
- Tanner Hudson (born 1994), American football player
- Terry Hudson (rugby league), English rugby league footballer of the 1960s, 1970s and 1980s
- Thomas Hudson (disambiguation), several people, including Tom Hudson
- Tim Hudson (1940–2019) (aka 'Lord' Tim Hudson), DJ, rock band manager, cricket manager, artist
- Tim Hudson (born 1975), MLB pitcher
- Tommy Hudson (American football) (born 1997), American football player
- Troy Hudson (born 1976), former NBA player

== W ==
- Will Hudson (basketball) (born 1989), American basketball player
- Will Hudson (songwriter) (1908–1981), Canadian-born American songwriter
- William Hudson (engineer) (1896–1978), New Zealand-born Australian engineer of the Snowy Mountains Scheme
- William Henry Hudson (1841–1922), Argentine-British author, naturalist, and ornithologist
- William Hudson (botanist) (1730–1793), British botanist and apothecary
- William L. Hudson (1794–1862), United States Navy officer in the 19th century
- William Parker Hudson (1841–1894), Canadian businessman and politician
- Winnifred Hudson (1905–1996), British-born painter who lived most of her life in Hawaii

== Fictional characters ==
- Angus Hudson, in the television series Upstairs Downstairs
- Baby Jane Hudson, in the novel and film What Ever Happened to Baby Jane?
- Finn Hudson, in the television musical comedy-drama series Glee
- Mrs. Hudson in the Sherlock Holmes stories by Arthur Conan Doyle
- William Hudson, in the science fiction action film Aliens
- Zack Hudson, in the British soap opera EastEnders
- Jason Hudson, in the Call of Duty: Black Ops video game series

== See also ==
- General Hudson (disambiguation)
- Justice Hudson (disambiguation)
- Senator Hudson (disambiguation)
