= General Metcalf =

General Metcalf or Metcalfe may refer to:

- Charles Metcalfe (British Army officer) (1856–1912), British Army major general
- Charles D. Metcalf (born 1933), U.S. Air Force major general
- John Francis Metcalfe (1908–1975), British Army major general
- Wilder Metcalf (1855–1935), U.S. Army major general
