= Ghostbusters firehouse =

Ghostbusters firehouse may refer to:

- Firehouse, Hook & Ladder Company 8, the New York firehouse used as the exterior of the Ghostbusters' base in the Ghostbusters films
- Fire Station No. 23 (Los Angeles, California), the Los Angeles firehouse used for interior scenes of the films
