= Jack Hudson =

Jack Hudson may refer to:

- Jack Hudson (English footballer) (1860–1941), English international footballer
- Jack Hudson (Australian footballer) (born 1934), Australian rules footballer
- Jack Hudson, a character from the TV series Sue Thomas: F.B.Eye

== See also ==
- John Hudson (disambiguation)
