= Senator Costello =

Senator Costello may refer to:

- Herman T. Costello (1920–2017), New Jersey State Senate
- Mark Costello (Iowa politician) (born 1961), Iowa State Senate
- Mia Costello (born 1968), Alaska State Senate
- Philip Costello (died 2007), Connecticut State Senate
