= John Hudson =

John Hudson may refer to:

== Academics ==
- John Hudson (classicist) (1662–1719), English classical scholar
- John Hudson (historian) (born 1962), English medieval historian
- John Hudson (mathematician) (1773–1843), English mathematician and senior wrangler
- John Hudson (Shakespeare scholar)
- John Wilz Napier Hudson (1857–1936), ethnologist, husband of California artist Grace Hudson

== Politics and military ==
- John Hudson (Indian Army officer) (1833–1893), British general
- John L. Hudson, U.S. Air Force general
- John T. Hudson (1810–1887), New York politician

== Sports ==
- John Hudson (American football) (born 1968), American NFL football player
- John Hudson (basketball, born 1954), American former basketball player
- John Hudson (basketball, born 1966), American former basketball player
- John Hudson (cricketer) (1882–1961), Australian cricketer
- John Hudson (golfer) (born 1945), English golfer
- John Hudson (rower) (born 1940), Australian Olympic rower
- John Wilson Hudson, known as Johnny Hudson (1912–1970), baseball infielder
- Jack Hudson (English footballer) (John Hudson, 1860–1941), English footballer

== Others ==
- John Hudson (actor) (1919–1996), older brother of actor William Hudson
- John Hudson (bishop) (1904–1981), Australian Anglican bishop
- John Hudson (journalist) (born 1956), New Zealand reporter
- John Hudson (theatre director) (born 1962), Canadian theatre producer and director, and politician in Alberta
- John Elbridge Hudson (1839–1900), U.S. lawyer, president of AT&T
- John Paul Hudson (1929–2002), American gay activist, writer, and actor
- John Pilkington Hudson (1910–2007), English horticultural scientist and bomb disposal expert

== See also ==
- Jon Hudson (born 1968), musician in Faith No More
- Jack Hudson (disambiguation)
- Hudson (surname)
- Hudson (disambiguation)
