= Joseph Hudson =

Joseph Hudson may refer to:

- Joseph Hudson (inventor) (1848–1930), inventor of the police whistle and referee whistle
- Joseph Hudson (tobacconist) (1778–1854), tobacconist to the British royal family
- Joseph Lowthian Hudson (1846–1912), founder of Hudson's department store
- Joseph Hadley Hudson (1977–2021), American professional wrestler, best known as Jocephus and Question Mark in National Wrestling Alliance
- Joseph Kennedy Hudson (1840–1907), general during the American Civil War and Spanish–American War, founder of the Topeka Daily Capital
- Joseph Neal Hudson (born 1982), US Army Spc. captured with American POWs in the 2003 invasion of Iraq

== See also ==
- Joe Hudson (disambiguation)
