= Frank Hudson =

Frank Hudson may refer to:

- Frank Hudson (RAF officer)
- Frank Hudson (American football)
- Willie Hudson, known as Frank, American Negro league baseball player
- Frank Dale Hudson, architect

== See also ==
- Franklin Hudson (1864–1918), American-born photographer, osteopath and medical author
