= Justice Hudson =

Justice Hudson may refer to:

- Albert Hudson (1875–1947), puisne justice of the Supreme Court of Canada
- Courtney Rae Hudson (born 1973), associate justice of the Arkansas Supreme Court
- James H. Hudson (1877–1947), associate justice of the Maine Supreme Judicial Court
- Manley Ottmer Hudson (1886–1960), judge of the Permanent Court of International Justice
- Natalie Hudson (born 1957), associate justice of the Minnesota Supreme Court
- Robin E. Hudson (born 1952), associate justice of the North Carolina Supreme Court
- Sanford A. Hudson (1817–1905), associate justice of the Dakota Territorial Supreme Court
