= Guilford, Maine =

Town in Maine, United States

- Town
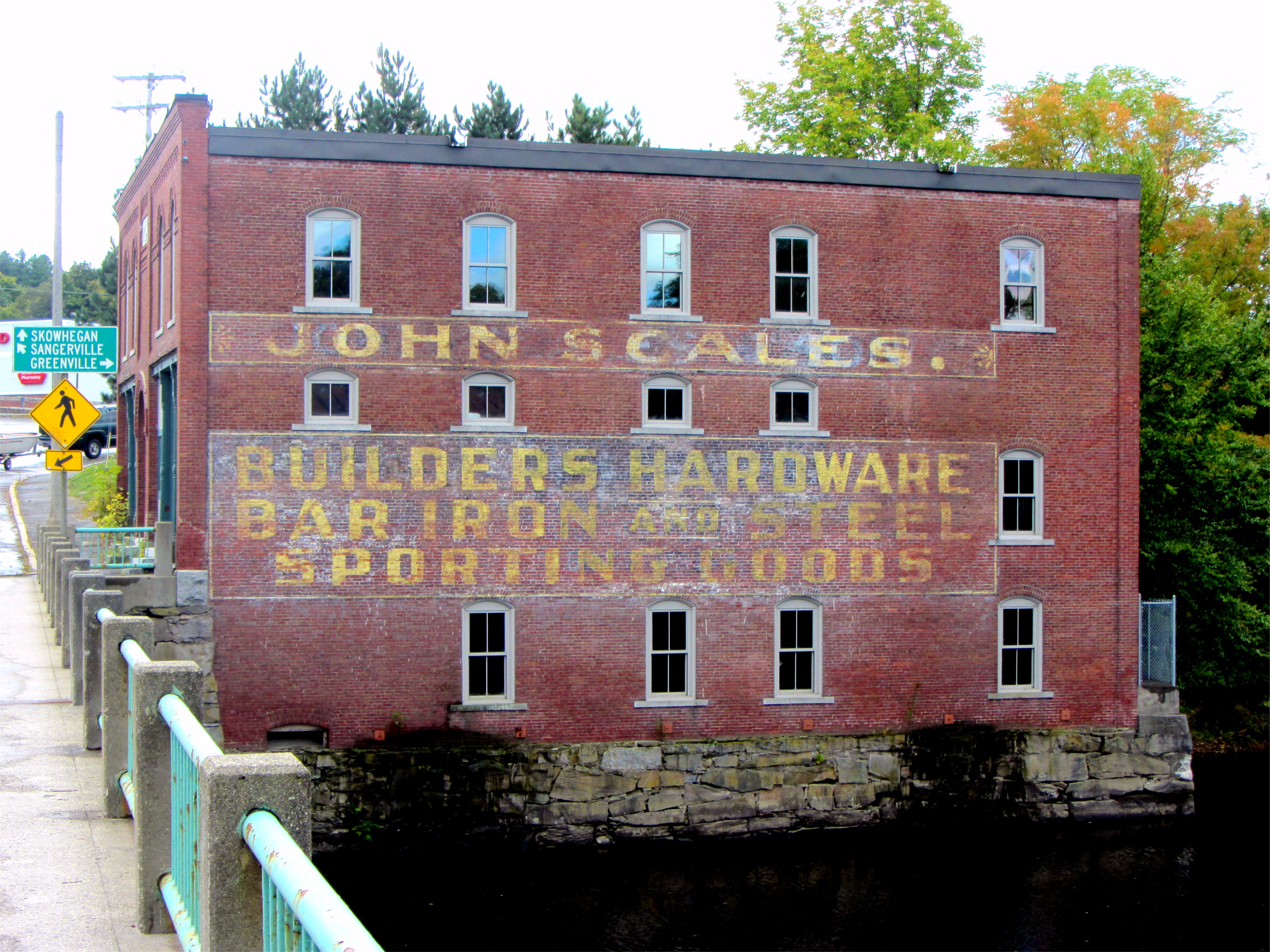

- Seal

- Location in Piscataquis County and the state of Maine
- Coordinates: 45°10′10″N 69°23′0″W
- Country: United States
- State: Maine
- County: Piscataquis

Area
  - Total: 35.71 sq mi (92.49 km^{2})
  - Land: 34.88 sq mi (90.34 km^{2})
  - Water: 0.83 sq mi (2.15 km^{2})
- Elevation: 400 ft (120 m)

Population (2020)
  - Total: 1,267
  - Density: 36/sq mi (14/km^{2})
- Time zone: UTC-5 (Eastern (EST))
  - Summer (DST): UTC-4 (EDT)
- ZIP code: 04443
- Area code: 207
- GNIS feature ID: 582504
- Website: townofguilford.com

Guilford is a town in Piscataquis County, Maine, United States. The town is located on the Piscataquis River and was first settled in 1806. The population was 1,267 at the time of the 2020 census. It contains a census-designated place of the same name.

== History ==
In 1803, Rev. Robert Low and Deacon Robert Herring of New Gloucester purchased several thousand acres in the area from Bowdoin College. The town itself was first settled on February 18, 1806. On October 8, 1812, a warrant was issued for the tract to be designated a "plantation," which became effective on November 11, 1806. The town was officially incorporated by the governor of the Commonwealth of Massachusetts on February 8, 1816. It was named after Moses Guilford Low (1816-1909), the first white child born here.

In June 2020, President Donald Trump visited Guilford and Puritan Medical Products during the COVID-19 pandemic. His visit drew large crowds to the Piscataquis County town.

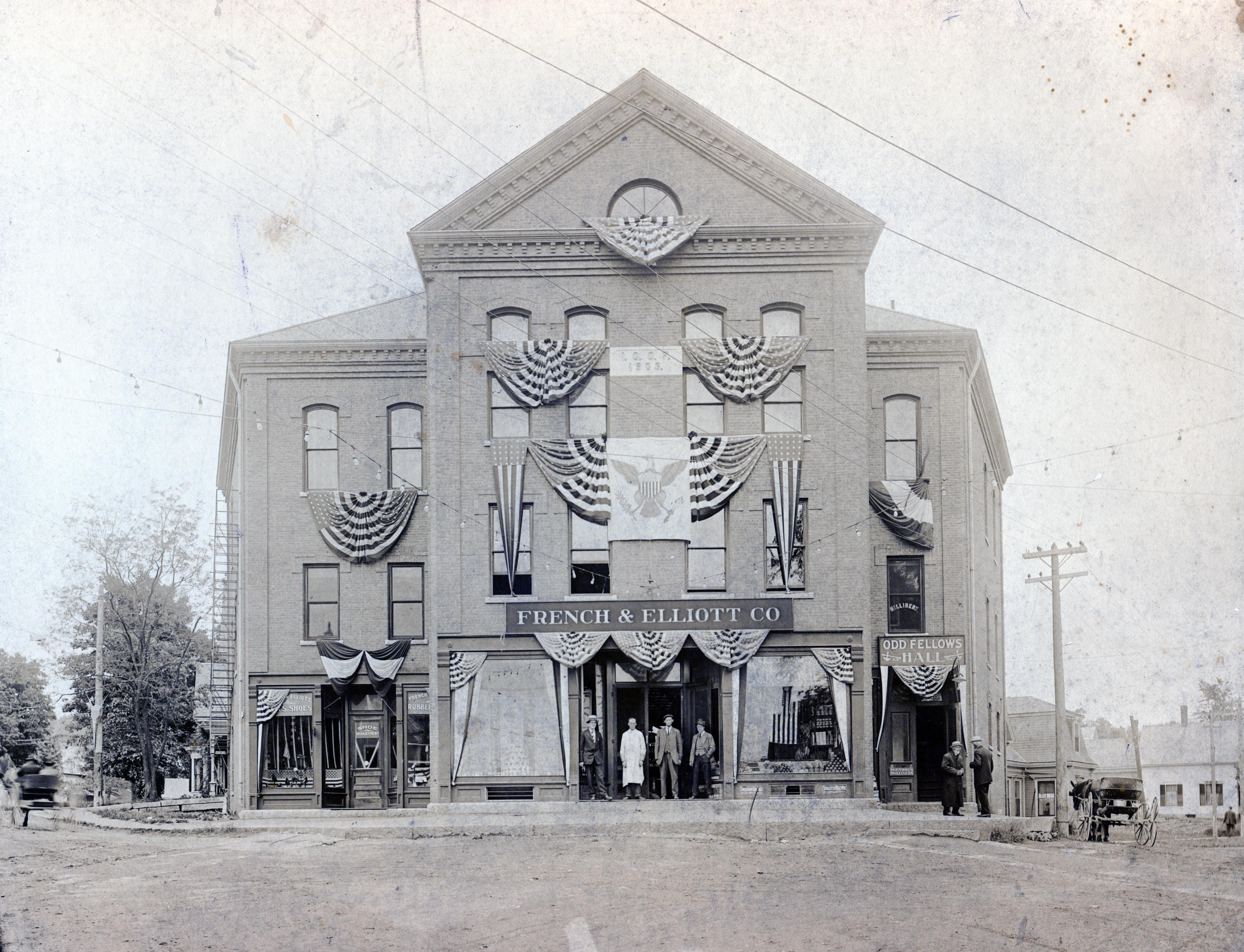
Masonic hall, Guilford, 1916, later demolished

== Geography ==
According to the United States Census Bureau, the town has a total area of 35.71 square miles (92.49 km^{2}), of which 34.88 square miles (90.34 km^{2}) is land and 0.83 square miles (2.15 km^{2}) is water.

== Demographics ==
Historical population
Census	Pop.	Note	%±
1820	325		—
1830	655		101.5%
1840	892		36.2%
1850	834		−6.5%
1860	837		0.4%
1870	818		−2.3%
1880	881		7.7%
1890	1,023		16.1%
1900	1,544		50.9%
1910	1,680		8.8%
1920	1,687		0.4%
1930	1,735		2.8%
1940	1,752		1.0%
1950	1,842		5.1%
1960	1,880		2.1%
1970	1,694		−9.9%
1980	1,793		5.8%
1990	1,710		−4.6%
2000	1,531		−10.5%
2010	1,521		−0.7%
2020	1,267		−16.7%
U.S. Decennial Census

=== 2010 census ===
As of the census of 2010, there were 1,521 people, 693 households, and 426 families living in the town. The population density was 43.6 inhabitants per square mile (16.8/km^{2}). There were 882 housing units at an average density of 25.3 per square mile (9.8/km^{2}). The racial makeup of the town was 96.9% White, 0.1% African American, 0.5% Native American, 0.7% Asian, 0.1% Pacific Islander, 0.3% from other races, and 1.4% from two or more races. Hispanic or Latino people of any race were 0.7% of the population.

There were 693 households, of which 24.2% had children under the age of 18 living with them, 44.6% were married couples living together, 11.1% had a female householder with no husband present, 5.8% had a male householder with no wife present, and 38.5% were non-families. 33.5% of all households were made up of individuals, and 16.2% had someone living alone who was 65 years of age or older. The average household size was 2.19 and the average family size was 2.70.

The median age in the town was 46.3 years. 19.4% of residents were under the age of 18; 6.9% were between the ages of 18 and 24; 22.4% were from 25 to 44; 30.4% were from 45 to 64; and 20.8% were 65 years of age or older. The gender makeup of the town was 47.9% male and 52.1% female.

=== 2000 census ===
As of the census of 2000, there were 1,531 people, 652 households, and 438 families living in the town. The population density was 43.8 inhabitants per square mile (16.9/km^{2}). There were 857 housing units at an average density of 24.5 per square mile (9.5/km^{2}). The racial makeup of the town was 96.28% White, 0.13% Black or African American, 0.65% Native American, 0.65% Asian, 0.13% from other races, and 2.16% from two or more races. Hispanic or Latino people of any race were 0.20% of the population.

There were 652 households, out of which 27.3% had children under the age of 18 living with them, 49.1% were married couples living together, 12.7% had a female householder with no husband present, and 32.8% were non-families. 26.7% of all households were made up of individuals, and 14.0% had someone living alone who was 65 years of age or older. The average household size was 2.35 and the average family size was 2.79.

In the town, the population was spread out, with 23.4% under the age of 18, 7.5% from 18 to 24, 25.9% from 25 to 44, 25.3% from 45 to 64, and 18.0% who were 65 years of age or older. The median age was 41 years. For every 100 females there were 87.9 males. For every 100 females age 18 and over, there were 85.3 males.

The median income for a household in the town was $27,500, and the median income for a family was $32,311. Males had a median income of $26,176 versus $20,000 for females. The per capita income for the town was $14,303. About 11.2% of families and 16.4% of the population were below the poverty line, including 22.6% of those under age 18 and 11.9% of those age 65 or over.

== Education ==
Guilford is part of Maine School Administrative District #4. The two schools in the district are Piscataquis Community Middle School and Piscataquis Community High School.

== In popular culture ==
Guilford is an important setting in Harry Turtledove's science fiction novels Supervolcano Trilogy.

== Notable people ==
- Stephen Hall, politician
- James H. Hudson, lawyer and judge
- Roxanne Quimby, businesswoman and founder of Burt's Bees
- Charles Tefft, sculptor
