= James Hudson =

James Hudson may refer to:

== Sports ==
- James Hudson (American football) (born 1999), American football player
- James Hudson (rugby union) (born 1981), English rugby union player
- Jim Hudson (1943–2013), American football player

== Fictional characters ==
- Guardian (Marvel Comics), aka James MacDonald Hudson, a Marvel Comics superhero
- Jim Hudson, character in the TV series Revolution
- Jimmy Hudson, Marvel Comics character

== Other ==
- Sir James Hudson (diplomat) (1810–1885), British diplomat
- James Hudson (explorer) (1854–1912), New Zealand doctor and explorer
- James Hudson (gardener) (1846–1932), English gardener who won the Victoria Medal of Honour
- James Hudson (politician) (1881–1962), British Member of Parliament
- James H. Hudson (1877–1947), American judge in Maine
- James Thompson (martyr) (died 1582), Catholic martyr also known as James Hudson
- James Hudson, 16th-century diplomat, brother of Thomas Hudson (poet)
