= Berkshire Medical College =

Defunct medical school in Massachusetts, United States

Berkshire Medical College (originally the Berkshire Medical Institution, and sometimes referred to as Berkshire Medical College) was a medical school in Pittsfield, Massachusetts. It is notable for establishing the first professorship in mental diseases at any medical school in the United States, and for granting the first medical degree ever issued to an African American.

It originated in 1823 as the Medical Department of Williams College, graduated 1138 people, and was disbanded in 1867.

== Notable alumni and faculty ==
- Elisha Bartlett physician, professor and poet who served in the Massachusetts House of Representatives and as the first mayor of Lowell, Massachusetts
- Paul A. Chadbourne, President of University of Wisconsin, Williams College and the Massachusetts Agricultural College (later University of Massachusetts)
- Henry H. Childs, Lieutenant Governor of Massachusetts and President of BMC
- Mason C. Darling, Congressman
- Pliny Earle (physician), professor of materia medica and psychology at BMC (the first professorship in mental diseases ever established by a medical college in the United States)
- Harvey Willson Harkness, mycologist and natural historian
- Josiah Gilbert Holland, novelist, poet and newspaperman
- Mark Hopkins (educator)
- Erasmus Darwin Hudson, abolitionist and orthopedic surgeon
- Willard Parker (surgeon), professor of surgery
- Charles L. Robinson, physician, abolitionist, newspaperman, California legislator, Kansas Free Stater and first Governor of Kansas
- Joseph Pomeroy Root, abolitionist, Kansas Free Stater and statesman
- James Skivring Smith, first African American to receive a medical degree from the institution (and second in the United States) and later President of Liberia
- George Vasey, United States Department of Agriculture Chief Botanist and curator of the National Herbarium
