= Los Angeles County Hall of Records (1911) =

Former building in downtown Los Angeles

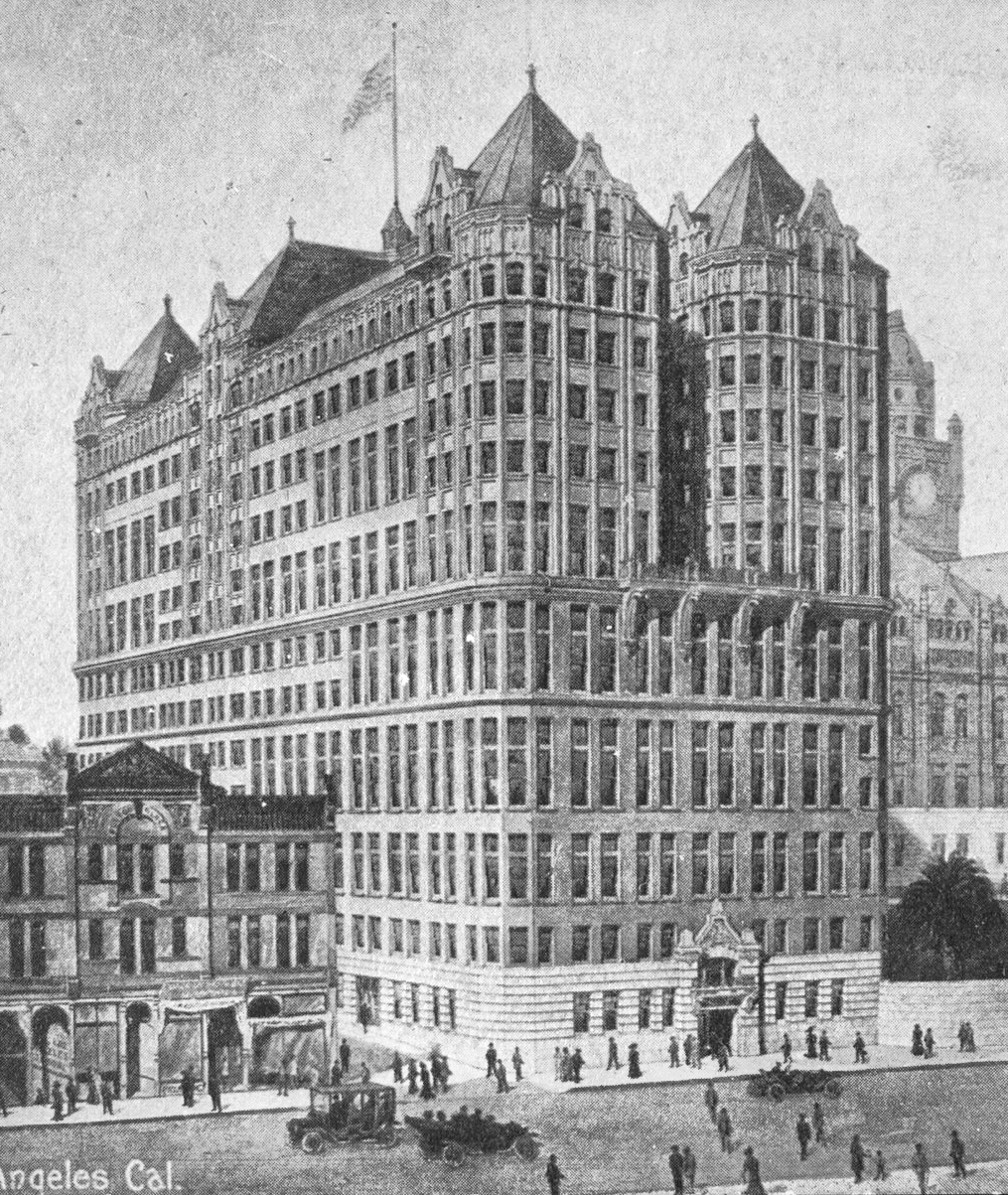
- 1910 sketch of the building
- Interactive map of the Los Angeles County Hall of Records area

General information
- Location: 220 N. Broadway, Los Angeles
- Coordinates: 34.0551°N 118.2440°W
- Year built: 1908-1911
- Completed: 1911
- Closed: 1973
- Demolished: March to September 1973
- Cost: $1.5 million ($53.8 million in 2025)

Technical details
- Floor count: 12

Design and construction
- Architecture firm: Hudson and Munsell

Los Angeles County Hall of Records (1911) was Los Angeles County government building originally located on New High Street, then at 220 N. Broadway after a street realignment, in downtown Los Angeles.

== History ==
The 1911 Los Angeles County Hall of Records building was built to alleviate overcrowding at the county courthouse it neighbored. Hudson and Munsell designed the building and Carl Heinrich Leonardt was the building contractor. Construction began in 1908 and finished in 1911. The building cost $1.5 million ($53.8 million in 2025) to construct and almost all Los Angeles County offices were moved into this building upon its completion.

The building was one of several used as a courthouse from 1934 to 1959.

By the 1960s, Los Angeles had built a new Civic Center (including the Los Angeles County Hall of Records built in 1962) that consisted of modern, monumental buildings arranged around a long and landscaped mall. This building, which clashed with the new constructions, was demolished in 1973.

After demolition, the building was replaced by a parking lot, which itself was replaced by the eastern end of Grand Park.

== Architecture and design ==
The 1911 Los Angeles County Hall of Records building featured a Gothic design and was made with granite with brick and terra cotta cladding. The building, which has been described as "a showy headpiece," featured finials, pyramidal gables, copper ribbing, decorative molding, large and narrow rectangular windows around the entire perimeter, a pointed and lavishly ornamented roof, and the upper floors were divided into two pairs of wings that joined at a central elevator shaft.

The building's most distinctive feature was its askew placement, which occurred due to a 1920s realignment of Spring Street during the construction of Los Angeles City Hall. The building was originally built flush against New High Street, of which the entire street was removed during the realignment. In the 1960s, the cost of rotating the building to align with its new neighbors was estimated to be $5 million ($51.1 million in 2025), an amount the city deemed "excessive." The rotation was not done.
