= Fire Station No. 23 (Los Angeles, California) =

Historic former fire station in Los Angeles, California

- U.S. National Register of Historic Places
- Los Angeles Historic-Cultural Monument
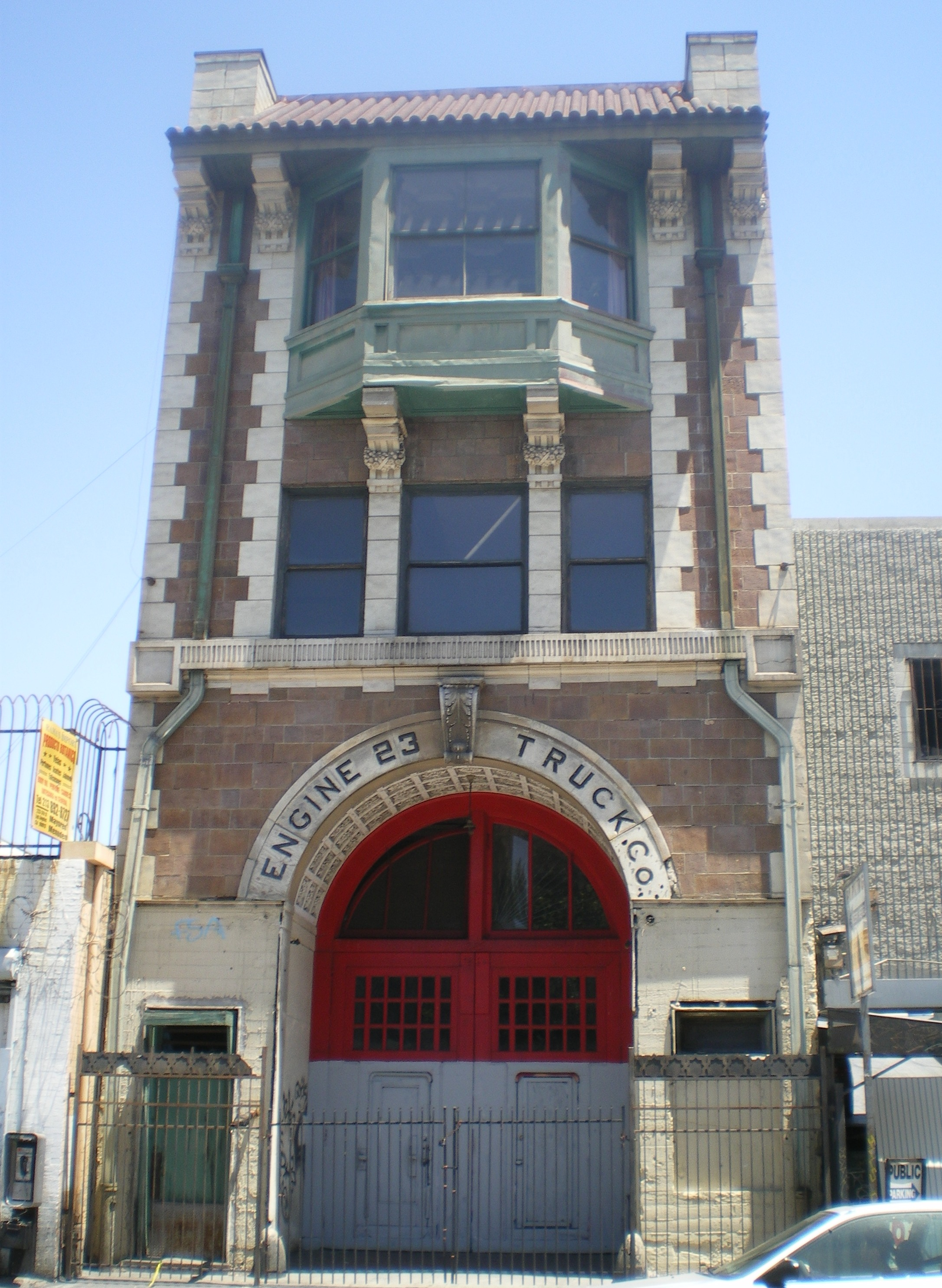
- Fire Station No. 23, 2008

- Location within the Los Angeles metropolitan area Location within California Location within the United States
- Location: 225 E. 5th St., Los Angeles, California
- Coordinates: 34°2′44.5″N 118°14′48.2″W
- Built: 1910
- Architect: Hudson and Munsell
- NRHP reference No.: 80000809
- LAHCM No.: 37

Significant dates
- Added to NRHP: June 9, 1980
- Designated LAHCM: February 18, 1966

Fire Station No. 23 is a former fire station in downtown Los Angeles. Built in 1910 as an operating station, it was also the Los Angeles Fire Department's headquarters until 1920 and the residence of every fire chief from 1910 to 1928. The station created a political firestorm when it opened, due to its ornate interior and expensive imported materials, leading to its being called the "Taj Mahal of fire stations".

After 50 years in operation, the station closed in 1960. It was declared a Los Angeles Historic Cultural Monument in 1966 and entered into the National Register of Historic Places in 1980. It has also become a popular filming location. Motion pictures filmed here include the Ghostbusters movies, Set It Off, The Mask, Police Academy 2, Flatliners, Firehouse and National Security.

== History ==
=== Construction and operation ===
In early 1909, the city of Los Angeles announced plans to build a three-story fire station in downtown's wholesale and manufacturing district that would also serve as the department's headquarters. Plans submitted by Hudson and Munsell were approved by May and the F. O. Engstrum Company was awarded the building contract in June. The station's projected cost was $35,000 ($1.25 million in 2025); however, the actual money spent was $53,000 or $57,000 and upon completion, controversy arose over the station's design and its use of expensive materials, particularly in the chief's living quarters, which alone was reported to have cost $25,000 ($863,839 in 2025). The Los Angeles Times called the station the "most elaborate and richest engine-house west of New York" and maybe the "most ornate ... in this or any other world."

The station was dedicated on October 10, 1910, after which "a political and civic storm" ensued. The station was called a waste of taxpayer funds, with its critics contending that "three station houses could be built for what this [one] cost." In response, fire commissioners criticized the station's extravagance and also denied responsibility for it, even though they had approved its plans.

The station's controversy subsided once it went into operation. It served as an active firehouse from 1910 to 1960, as the department's headquarters from 1910 to 1920, and as the home for every fire chief from 1910 to 1928. When the station opened, it was staffed by fifteen firefighters and ten horses, and its original equipment included a horse wagon, chief's buggy, and a pumper that used a vertical tube boiler. Its first major call was a fire in the Byrne Building that took ten hours to extinguish.

In 1928, the station's third floor was converted for use by the Department's Medical Liaison Section and Training Section. Additionally, at some point, a kitchen was added to the second floor. The station closed in 1960 as the department began replacing older stations with modern ones. During its fifty years in operation, the station experienced 60,000 alarms.

=== Preservation and restoration ===
In 1966, Fire Station No. 23 was declared a Los Angeles Historic Cultural Monument; at the time, the Los Angeles Times called it the "Taj Mahal of fire stations". A 1979 Library of Congress survey of 250 firehouses concluded that Station 23's interior was "unmatched in its beauty." The station was added to the National Register of Historic Places in 1980.

The station deteriorated throughout the 1960s and 1970s, and by the mid-1970s, it was considered a hazard. The surrounding neighborhood became Skid Row and the station became a gathering place for people of the street. Additionally, looters stole most of the station's copper tubing, brasswork, banisters, doorknobs, firebells, and slide poles.

In 1979, the city announced plans to restore the station, then turn it into a museum. City Council placed the station under control of the Los Angeles Fire Department, but they provided no museum funds. Therefore, in 1981, the fire department created a nonprofit to raise the projected $1 million ($3.54 million in 2025) necessary for the museum; however, these funds were never raised, with critics questioning the wisdom of building a museum in Skid Row. In 1988, the city chose another location in Hollywood for the museum.

In 1995, the Los Angeles Times reported on the misuse of funds by the nonprofit charged with Fire Station No. 23's restoration, the controversy discovered after a Warner Bros. official complained about being forced to make donations to the Fire Department, something that official referred to as extortion. The Times reported that ex-Chief Donald O. Manning had not told the city about the non-profit's continued operation, that the nonprofit had earned more than $200,000 ($422,581 in 2025) by renting Fire Station No. 23 and other stations to film and television productions, and that the income was never turned over. Investigations also revealed additional earnings paid in cash to James Croak, who lived in the building from 1978 to 1985; however, no illegality was found as Croak had the right to sub-lease the property for short periods with proper notification. Furthermore, the investigations revealed that Croak spent most of his earnings on replacements for the station's missing brass slide poles, balustrades, and other fixtures, effectively making him the station's caretaker. However, the non-profit's earnings were not accounted for.

Croak vacated Fire Station No. 23 in 1985, after which a new caretaker, Daniel Taylor, moved in. Taylor continued raising funds through film shoots; he also made the station available to neighborhood groups as he sought to turn the space into a community center. However, Taylor was evicted in 2009, after the city discovered he was not carrying the proper insurance.

In 1996, Los Angeles voters approved Proposition K, which was meant to fund the acquisition, improvement, construction, and maintenance of city parks, recreation facilities, and other youth-oriented spaces, including Fire Station No. 23's transition into a youth arts center. However, the station was still in disrepair as of 2023 and many in the community believed its conversion to a youth arts center was no longer appropriate given the area's shift in demographics.

== Architecture and design ==
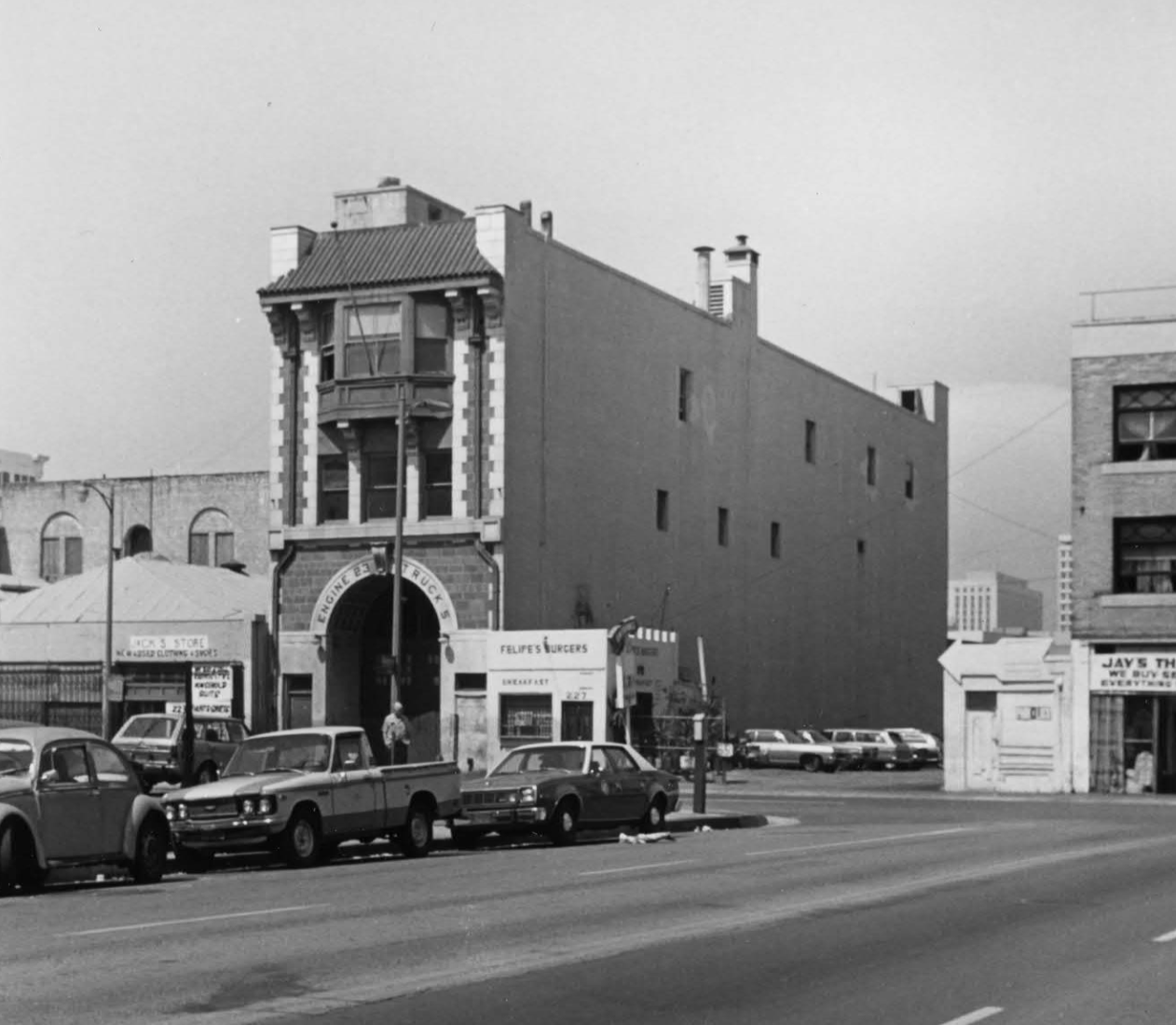
The building in 1980

Fire Station No. 23 is a three-story reinforced concrete structure with a basement underneath. Designed by Hudson and Munsell, the station is rectangular in plan and is unusually narrow; it measures 26 feet (7.9 m) wide, 167 feet (51 m) deep, and stretches the entire distance from Fifth to Winston Street.

=== Exterior ===
Fire Station No. 23's exterior was designed in a utilitarian manner and features an eclectic selection of design elements. The facade is divided into three components: an arched central entrance with a coffered ceiling and offset doorway, a second level with three flat window openings, and a third level consisting of a slanted bay window that rests on two large brackets and a slanted roof featuring decorative red tile. The first and second levels are separated by a decorative terra cotta band and the overall design creates a sense of verticality unusual for buildings of its size.

Despite the building's utilitarian design, its front facade features ornamentation that creates an opulent yet restrained elegance. This ornamentation includes lower level Italian marble and upper level terra cotta trimmed with stone, and the facade also features mission tile, plate glass, and marble lettering. Additional details include skylights, lamps that flank the arched entrance, and copper conductors, drainpipes, and sheathing.

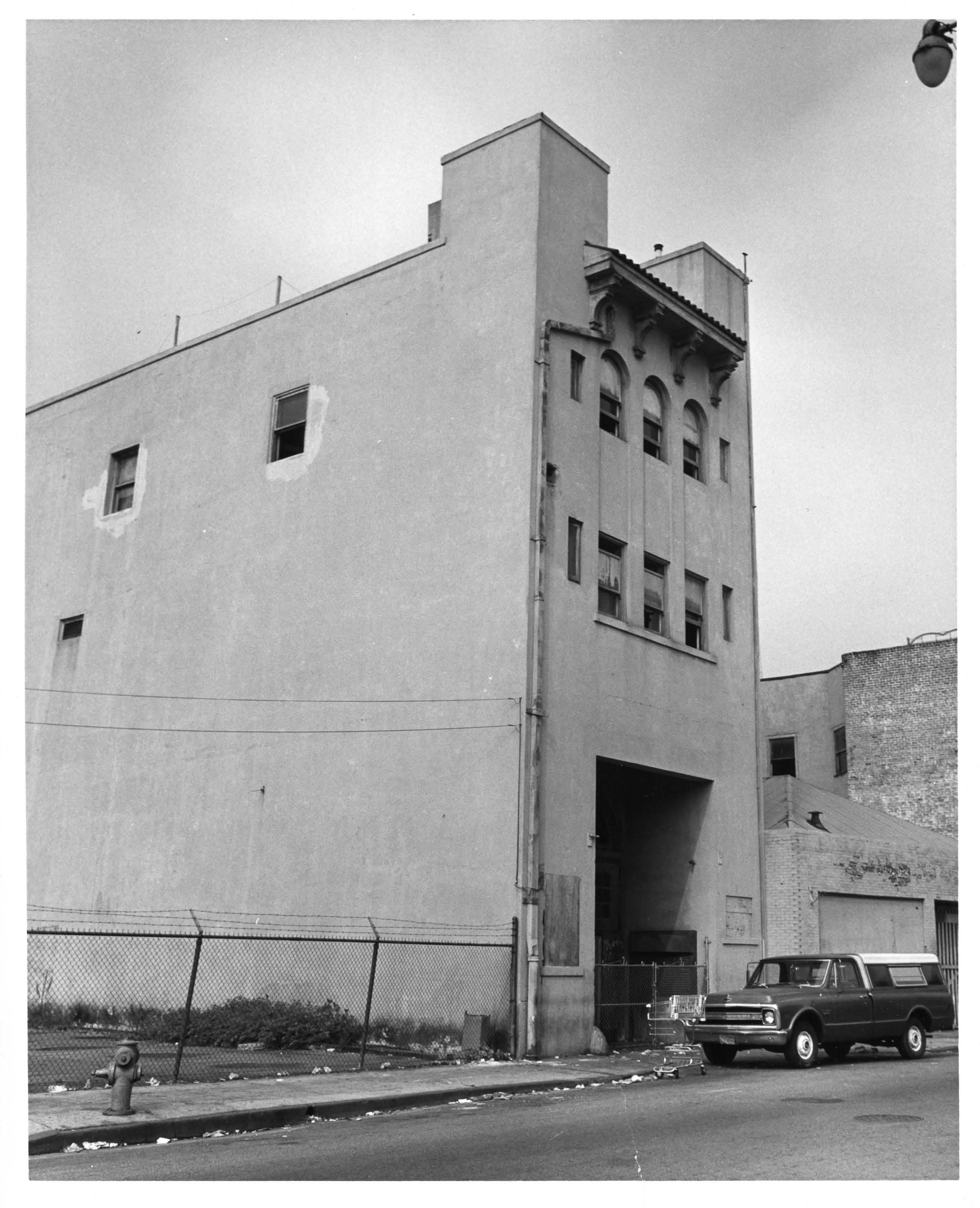
Side and rear facade

The station's rear facade also has architectural detail, including a bracketed tile roof with cornice, flat and arched windows, and a central entrance.

=== Interior ===
Fire Station No. 23's interior consists of four levels: a basement designed for storage; ground floor for firefighting operations; second story with an assembly room, trunk room, dormitory, lockers, toilets, and a bath; and third story living quarters. Two automatic elevators, a dumbwaiter, and a system of slide poles traverse the floors.

The station's ground floor consists of an arcade that connects Fifth and Winston Street and originally featured stalls for ten horses as well as area for firetrucks, lockers, an annunciator, and a hose tower. The arcade was designed with repressed vitrified brick, white tile, oak trim, and a pressed steel ceiling that rises 21 feet (6.4 m) above the floor. The second floor features a cement floor, plaster and burlap walls finished with white oak trim, tile wainscot, and more oak trim.

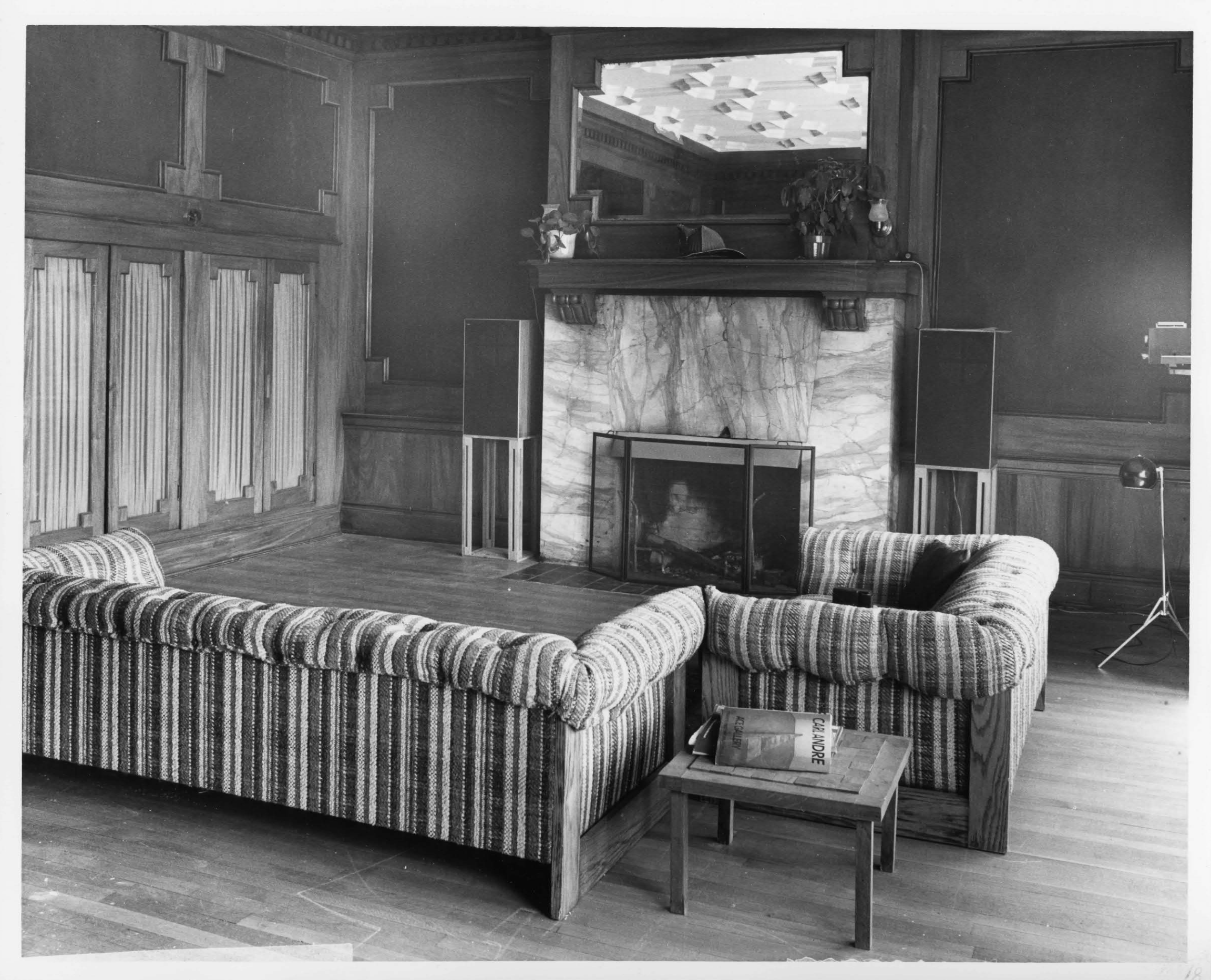
Third floor interior

The station's third floor living quarters has been described as "the chief's boudoir" and a "palace for chiefs". It contains a reception room, dining room, chief's room and chambers, and a large bathroom, each room excepting the bathroom finished with polished inlaid oak floors, leatherette wall coverings, ornamental stucco ceilings, and Peruvian mahogany trim. The bathroom is finished with marble. The third floor also contains a private slide pole, a mantel made of Vermont marble and featuring a French mirror, and "a tub big enough for two chiefs".

== Film location ==
After Fire Station No. 23's retirement as a fire station, it became a popular filming location. The first major motion picture filmed at Station 23 was Hammett (1982), followed two years later by Ghostbusters. The success of Ghostbusters popularized the station as a shoot location, and it has since then been used in more than fifty productions, including Big Trouble in Little China (1986), Ghostbusters II (1989), The Mask (1994), Police Academy 2 (1985), A-Team (1986), V.I. Warshawski (1991), Flatliners (1990), Set It Off (1996), Lost Highway (1997), National Security (2003), RE(e)volution (2005), and Ghostbusters: Afterlife (2021).

== See also ==
- List of Registered Historic Places in Los Angeles
