= London International College =

Former school in Isleworth, London, England

Coordinates: 51.4805°N 0.3375°W

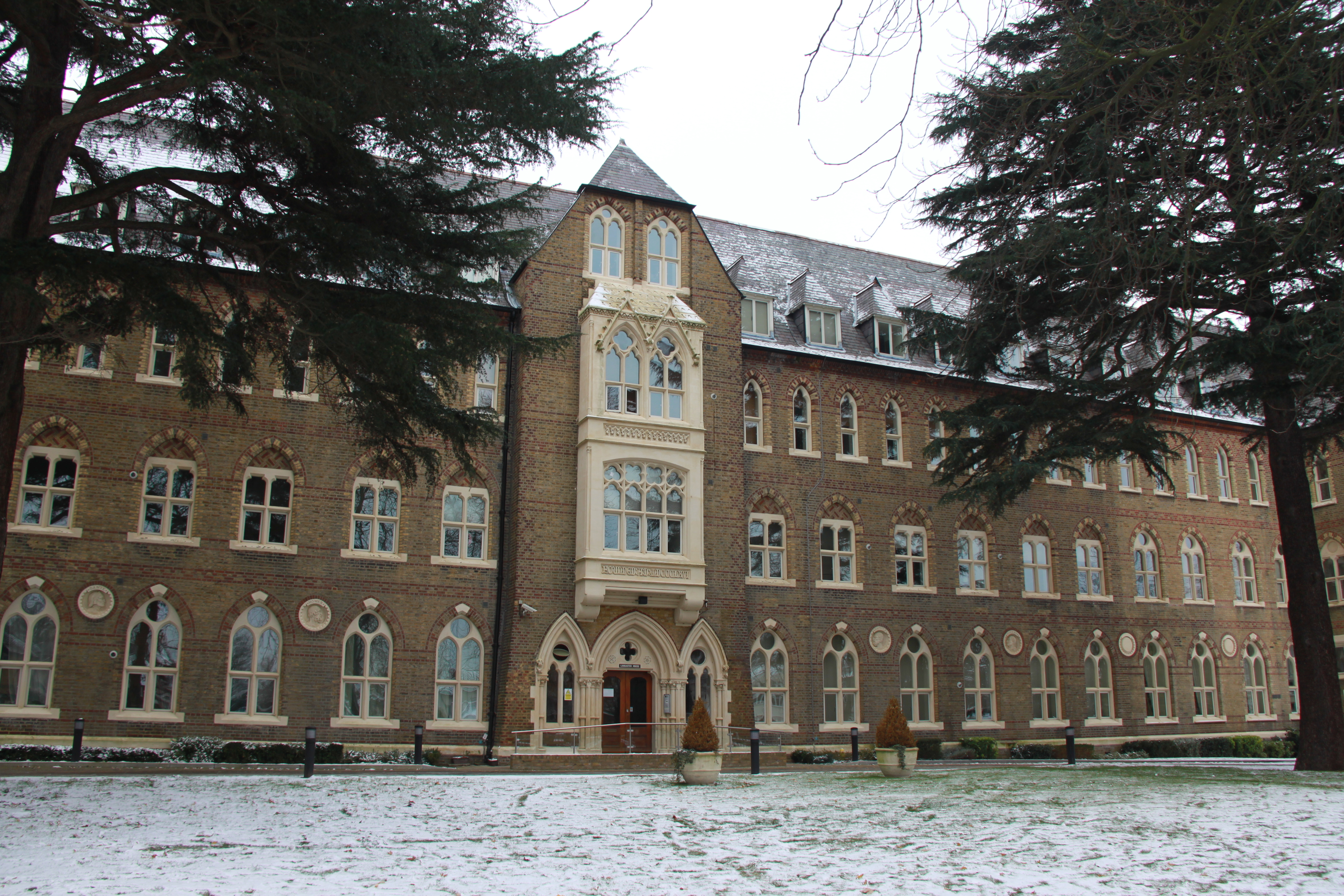
Lancaster House, the former premises of London International College

The London International College in London was an early attempt at international education, operating from 1867 to 1889. It enrolled secondary-school students from a number of countries in a programme aimed at fostering internationalist sentiments in its pupils. Its official name was the London College of the International Education Society, and it was also known as the Spring Grove School, from its location in the Spring Grove area of Isleworth, London.

== History ==
The International Education Society was organized in 1863, primarily by Liberal politician and industrialist Richard Cobden, who hoped international education could help eliminate war and promote free trade (an idea that had been discussed by a number of like-minded individuals at the 1855 Paris Exposition). Cobden died before the school opened, but William Ellis provided funding to complete the school's construction. The college's buildings were completed in 1866, and it officially opened in 1867, with classicist Leonhard Schmitz as the first headmaster. It engaged in a number of other educational experiments besides the focus on internationalism: it eliminated corporal punishment, and instituted an unusually science-focused curriculum, developed with noted scientists Thomas Henry Huxley and John Tyndall on its board of directors. In addition, Latin and Greek instruction was delayed to a later age than was then common, and instead instruction in modern languages was emphasized.

The college enrolled 10 day students and 58 boarders in its first year, rising to 100 students by the 1880s, many of whom came from other countries. The school operated until 1889, when it was closed for unclear reasons, and the premises sold to Borough Road College. The ornately decorated main building survives and is noted in architectural guides. It was made a Grade II listed building in 2000.

== Notable alumni ==
- Maurice Hewlett, author and poet
- Frank Dale Hudson, American architect
- James Sligo Jameson, naturalist and traveller.
