= Guilford (CDP), Maine =

Guilford, Maine
- Census-designated place
- Location in Piscataquis County and the state of Maine

- Location within Maine Location within the United States
- Coordinates: 45°10′12″N 69°23′19″W
- Country: United States
- State: Maine
- County: Piscataquis

Area
  - Total: 1.97 sq mi (5.10 km^{2})
  - Land: 1.92 sq mi (4.97 km^{2})
  - Water: 0.054 sq mi (0.14 km^{2})
- Elevation: 377 ft (115 m)

Population (2020)
  - Total: 740
  - Density: 385.9/sq mi (148.98/km^{2})
- Time zone: UTC-5 (Eastern (EST))
  - Summer (DST): UTC-4 (EDT)
- ZIP code: 04443
- Area code: 207
- FIPS code: 23-30060
- GNIS feature ID: 0567367

Guilford is a census-designated place (CDP) in the town of Guilford in Piscataquis County, Maine, United States. The population was 945 at the 2000 census.

== Geography ==
Guilford is located at 45°10′11″N 69°23′19″W (45.169966, −69.388721).

According to the United States Census Bureau, the CDP has a total area of 2.0 square miles (5.2 km^{2}), of which 2.0 square miles (5.1 km^{2}) is land and 0.04 square mile (0.1 km^{2}) (2.00%) is water.

== Demographics ==
Historical population
Census	Pop.	Note	%±
2020	740		—
U.S. Decennial Census

As of the census of 2000, there were 945 people, 407 households, and 264 families residing in the CDP. The population density was 482.7 inhabitants per square mile (186.4/km^{2}). There were 506 housing units at an average density of 258.5 per square mile (99.8/km^{2}). The racial makeup of the CDP was 97.25% White, 0.74% Native American, 0.85% Asian, 0.11% from other races, and 1.06% from two or more races. Hispanic or Latino people of any race were 0.21% of the population.

There were 407 households, out of which 28.7% had children under the age of 18 living with them, 45.7% were married couples living together, 14.5% had a female householder with no husband present, and 34.9% were non-families. 29.7% of all households were made up of individuals, and 16.2% had someone living alone who was 65 years of age or older. The average household size was 2.32 and the average family size was 2.83.

In the CDP, the population was spread out, with 23.9% under the age of 18, 7.5% from 18 to 24, 25.6% from 25 to 44, 23.0% from 45 to 64, and 20.0% who were 65 years of age or older. The median age was 40 years. For every 100 females, there were 81.7 males. For every 100 females age 18 and over, there were 79.3 males.

The median income for a household in the CDP was $27,596, and the median income for a family was $34,125. Males had a median income of $25,833 versus $18,929 for females. The per capita income for the CDP was $14,071. About 10.8% of families and 14.9% of the population were below the poverty line, including 20.6% of those under age 18 and 7.5% of those age 65 or over.
