= Senator Hudson =

Senator Hudson may refer to:

- Betty Hudson (1931–2016), Connecticut State Senate
- Billy Hudson (1938–2022), Mississippi State Senate
- Brad Hudson (fl. 2010s–present), Missouri State Senate
- Charles Hudson (American politician) (1795–1881), Massachusetts State Senate
- Douglas Hudson (1905–1983), New York State Senate
- George R. Hudson (1919–2012), Illinois State Senate
- Perry J. Hudson (1916–1998), Georgia State Senate
- Washington E. Hudson (1866–1964), Oklahoma State Senate

== See also ==
- Paula Hicks-Hudson (born 1951), Ohio State Senate
