= Piscataquis Community High School =

Location
- 9 Campus Drive; Guilford, Maine 04443; United States
- Coordinates: 45°10′20″N 69°22′41″W

Information
- School district: RSU 80/SAD 4
- Principal: John Keane
- Teaching staff: 21.60 (FTE)
- Grades: 7–12
- Student to teacher ratio: 10.88
- Campus size: Small
- Campus type: Rural
- Accreditation: New England Association of Schools and Colleges
- Website: www.sad4.org/page/pchs

Piscataquis Community High School is a high school located in Guilford, Maine, United States. The school serves students from Abbot, Cambridge, Guilford, Parkman, Sangerville, and Wellington.
