= Hammett =

Hammett may refer to:

- Hammett L. Bowen, Jr. (1947–1969), Medal of Honor recipient
- Hammett Pinhey Hill (1876–1942), politician

Surname

- Benjamin Hammett, Sheriff of the City of London, 1788
- Bryant Hammett (born 1956), Louisiana politician
- Charles Hammett (fl. 1910–1919), American college football coach
- Dashiell Hammett (1894–1961), author of novels The Maltese Falcon and The Thin Man
- Greg Hammett, American plasma physicist
- John Yurmet, Puerto Rican wrestler, a.k.a. "Mr. 450" Hammett
- Kirk Hammett (born 1962), guitarist for the heavy metal band Metallica
- Louis Plack Hammett (1894–1987), physical chemist who developed the Hammett equation
- Mark Hammett (born 1972), New Zealand rugby player
- Seth Hammett (born 1946), U.S. politician in Alabama
- William H. Hammett (died 1861), U.S. Representative from Mississippi

== See also ==
- Cornish surnames
- Curtin–Hammett principle
- ESP Kirk Hammett
- Hammett (film), 1982 film about writer Dashiell Hammett
- Hammett Prize
- Hammett, Georgia, a community in the United States
- Hammett acidity function
- Hammett equation, based on the Hammett substituent constants sigma
