= General Hudson =

General Hudson may refer to:

- Havelock Hudson (1862–1944), British Indian Army general
- John L. Hudson (fl. 1970s–2010s), U.S. Air Force lieutenant general
- Lewis C. Hudson (1910–2001), U.S. Marine Corps brigadier general
- Peter Hudson (British Army officer) (1923–2000), British Army lieutenant general
