= Erasmus Darwin Hudson Jr. =

American physician

Erasmus Darwin Hudson Jr., M.D. (10 November 1843, in Northampton, Massachusetts – 9 May 1887, in New York City) was an American thoracic physician and educator.

== Biography ==
He was the son of orthopedic surgeon and abolitionist Erasmus Darwin Hudson and Martha Turner Hudson. He graduated from the College of the City of New York in 1864, and received an M.D. from the New York College of Physicians and Surgeons in 1867. In 1871, he married Laura Shaw.

He was house surgeon of Bellevue Hospital in 1867/8, and held the office of health inspector of New York City in 1869/70. In 1870 he was attending physician to the class for diseases of the eye of the outdoor department of Bellevue hospital, and from 1870 until 1872 was attending physician at the Northwestern Dispensary. From 1870 until his death, he was attending physician to Trinity Chapel parish and Trinity Home.

He was professor of principles and practice of medicine in the Woman's Medical College of New York infirmary from 1872 until 1882, and professor of general medicine and physical diagnosis in the New York Polyclinic from 1882 until his death from pneumonia in 1887.

== Publications ==
- “Report of Pulse and Respiration of Infants” in Eliot's Obstetric Clinic (1872)
- Diagnostic Relations of the Indigestions (New York, 1876)
- Doctors, Hygiene, and Therapeutics (1877)
- Methods of Examining Weak Chests (1885)
- Limitations of the Diagnosis of Malaria (1885)
- Home Treatment of Consumptives (1886)
- Physical Diagnosis of Thoracic Diseases (2d ed., 1887)
