= Thomas Hudson =

Thomas, Tommy or Tom Hudson may refer to:

== Arts and entertainment ==
- Thomas Hudson (poet) (died c. 1605), English musician and poet at the court of James VI of Scotland
- Thomas Hudson (painter) (1701–1779), British portraitist
- Thomas Hudson (songwriter) (1791–1844), English performer and writer of comic songs
- Thomas P. Hudson (1852–1909), American-English stage manager in Australia
- Tom Hudson (art educator) (1922–1997), British art educationalist
- Tom Hudson (English actor) (born 1986), English actor
- Tom Hudson (French actor) (born 1994), French actor

== Sports ==
- Thomas Hudson (pentathlete) (born 1935), British Olympic modern pentathlete
- Tommy Hudson (bowler) (born ca. 1947), American ten-pin bowler
- Tom Hudson (rugby union) (born 1994), English rugby union player
- Tommy Hudson (American football) (born 1997), American football tight end

== Others ==
- Thomas Hudson (MP) (1772–1852), British MP for Evesham
- Thomas Jefferson Hudson (1839–1923), U.S. representative from Kansas
- Thomas J. Hudson (born 1961), Canadian genome scientist
- Thomas Hudson (academic administrator), American academic, president of Jackson State University
- Tom Hudson (programmer), American computer programmer
