= Joe Hudson =

Joe Hudson may refer to:

- Joe Hudson (catcher) (born 1991), Major League Baseball catcher
- Joe Hudson (pitcher) (born 1970), Major League Baseball pitcher
- Joe Hudson (racing driver) (born 1966), American professional stock car racing driver
- Joe Hudson (Shortland Street), fictional character

== See also ==
- Joseph Hudson (disambiguation)
