= Charles Hudson =

Charles Hudson may refer to:

- Sir Charles Hudson, 1st Baronet (1730–1813), English baronet
- Charles Hudson (American politician) (1795–1881), American historian and politician, congressman in U.S. House of Representatives from Massachusetts
- Charles Hudson (Australian politician) (1866–1937), Australian state politician
- Charles Hudson (baseball) (born 1959), American major league baseball player from Ennis, Texas
- Charles Hudson (climber) (1828–1865), mountain climber
- Charles Hudson (footballer) (1872–1955), English footballer
- C. B. Hudson (born 1974), musician
- Charles Hudson (British Army officer) (1892–1959), British Victoria Cross recipient and general
- Charles M. Hudson (1932–2013), American historian, archaeologist, and author
- Charles Thomas Hudson (1828–1903), English naturalist
- Charlie Hudson (born 1949), American major league baseball player from Ada, Oklahoma
- Charlie Hudson (footballer, born 1920) (1920–2008), English footballer, centre forward for Accrington Stanley
- Charlie Hudson, pigeon breeder and racer, owner of The King of Rome
