= Scott Hudson =

Scott Hudson may refer to:

- Scott Hudson (computer scientist), professor at Carnegie Mellon University
- Scott Hudson (electrical engineer), astronomer and professor of electrical engineering
