= Jack Hudson (Australian footballer) =

Australian rules footballer

Personal information
- Full name: Jack Hudson
- Born: 9 March 1934 (age 92)
- Original team: South Colts
- Height: 175 cm (5 ft 9 in)
- Weight: 86 kg (190 lb)

Playing career^{1}
Years	Club	Games (Goals)
1954–59	South Melbourne	42 (1)
- ^{1} Playing statistics correct to the end of 1959.

Jack Hudson (born 9 March 1934) is a former Australian rules footballer who played with South Melbourne in the Victorian Football League (VFL).
