= Donald Hudson =

Donald Hudson may refer to:

- Donald Hudson (aviator) (1895–1967), World War I flying ace
- Donald E. Hudson earthquake engineer
- Donald Foster Hudson (1916–2003), missionary
- Don Hudson (1929–2018), American football player
