= Michael Hudson =

Michael Hudson may refer to:

- Michael Hudson (admiral) (1933–2005), Australian naval officer
- Michael Hudson (economist) (born 1939), American economist, professor of economics at the University of Missouri, Kansas City
- Michael Hudson (Medal of Honor) (1834–1891), American Medal of Honor recipient
- Michael Hudson (political scientist) (1938–2021), American political scientist, director of Middle East Institute and professor at the National University of Singapore
- Michael Hudson (reporter) (born 1961), American investigative journalist
- Michael Hudson (Royalist) (1605–1648), chaplain to Charles I and a scoutmaster in the Royalist army
- Michael Derrick Hudson (born 1963), American poet who occasionally used the pseudonym Yi-Fen Chou
