= Erasmus Darwin Hudson =

American surgeon and anti-slavery activist

Erasmus Darwin Hudson (December 15, 1805, in Torringford, Connecticut – December 31, 1880, in Greenwich, Connecticut) was a medical doctor and anti-slavery organizer in the United States. Starting his career in Connecticut, he also practiced surgery in Massachusetts before moving to New York City in 1850, where he became a general and orthopedic surgeon. He resided there for the rest of his life, concentrating on his career as a surgeon.

== Biography ==
When young, he was educated by a private tutor and at Torringford Academy. He graduated from Berkshire Medical College in 1827. He practiced in Bloomfield, Connecticut from 1828 to 1833, and also practiced at the Connecticut State Emigrant Hospital there. Around 1850 he became a general and orthopedic surgeon, first in Springfield, Massachusetts and later in New York City.

In 1828 he lectured on temperance. From 1837 until 1849 he served as a lecturing agent of the Connecticut Anti-Slavery Society and general agent of the American Anti-Slavery Society. He was particularly active on the lecture circuit in Pennsylvania, New York and New England. He worked with major antislavery figures, including Abby Kelley, Wendell Phillips, Frederick Douglass, William Lloyd Garrison, Isaac Hopper, Samuel May and Lewis Hayden.

In 1850, Hudson moved to New York City for his practice, and resided there until his death. He devoted himself to orthopedic surgery and mechanical apparatus for deformities, artificial limbs, etc. During the American Civil War, Hudson was appointed by the U.S. government to fit apparatus to persons suffering special cases of gunshot injuries of bone, resections, ununited fractures, and amputations at the knee- and ankle-joints. He invented several prosthetic and orthopedic appliances to aid in such efforts, and his works received awards at the Exposition Universelle of Paris in 1867, and at the 1876 Centennial Exhibition in Philadelphia.

== Writings ==
Hudson wrote an “Essay on Temperance” (1828) before he became involved in the anti-slavery movement. Many people interested in progressive reform supported both movements.

He contributed articles to The Liberator and the Anti-Slavery Standard (Boston and New York, 1837–49). He was co-editor of The Charter Oak, published in Hartford, Connecticut, serving from 1838 to 1841. Professionally he published numerous reported cases in the Medical and Surgical History of the War of the Rebellion (Washington, 1870–72). He published monographs on “Resections” (New York, 1870), “Syme's Amputation” (New York, 1871), and “Immobile Apparatus for Ununited Fractures” (New York, 1872).

== Family ==
Hudson married and had a family. His son Erasmus Darwin Hudson, Jr. became a noted physician.
