= Hudson & Munsell =

American architectural partnership

Hudson & Munsell was an architecture partnership in Los Angeles, California best known for designing the Los Angeles County General Hospital Administration Building, the first Los Angeles County Hall of Records, the Natural History Museum of Los Angeles County, and numerous historic homes.

== Partners ==
=== Frank Dale Hudson ===
Frank Dale Hudson
- Born: January 31, 1868; Oakland, California
- Died: March 14, 1941 (aged 73); Los Angeles, California
- Education: London International College, 1885
- Occupation: Architect
- Spouse: Harriet L. Beebe
- Practice: Hudson & Krause (1895-1899); Hudson & Munsell (1901-1931)

Frank Dale Hudson was born on January 31, 1868, and raised in Oakland, California. He was the second son of Henry S. (December 1819 - November 29, 1878) and Mary J. (Muir) Hudson (1829 – 1872). He attended secondary school at London International College in England, where he graduated in 1885.

After graduating, Hudson moved to San Francisco where he began his career as a draftsman for William Curlett in the office of architects William F. Curlett and Walter J. Cuthbertson. Hudson followed Curlett and Cuthbertson when they moved to Los Angeles in 1887/1888 and added Theodore Eisen to the partnership. Hudson worked as a draftsman at Curlett, Eisen, and Cuthbertson (also Curlett and Eisen) from 1888 to 1894, when he established his own practice.

During Hudson's first few years as an architect, he often partnered with Julius W. Krause, doing business as Hudson and Krause (1895 – 1896). Hudson was appointed Building Superintendent for the City of Los Angeles on January 3, 1899, where he served two years making a salary of $2000 ($77,400 in 2025). Hudson resumed his private practice in 1901 when he established his partnership with William A. O. Munsell. Their offices were located in the Stimson Block until the partnership dissolved in 1931.

Hudson was a pioneer with fireproof and soundproof building stone and became president of the American Institute of Architects's southern California chapter in 1910.

Hudson married Harriet L. Beebe in Alameda County on September 23, 1890, and they had a daughter (Doris) in 1893. Hudson died in Los Angeles in 1941.

=== William A. O. Munsell ===
William A. O. Munsell
- Born: March 2, 1866; Coldwater, Ohio
- Died: April 22, 1944 (aged 78)
- Occupation: Architect
- Spouse(s): Octavia S. Winder (1891); Julia V. K. Wilkes (1903)
- Practice: Locke & Munsell (1900-1901); Hudson & Munsell (1901-1931)

William A. O. Munsell was born to Elmore Yocum Munsell, a physician, and Ariadne Goodwin Farrington Munsell in Coldwater, Ohio in 1866. He was the eldest of four siblings and was named after his paternal grandfather. In 1867, his family moved to North Star, Ohio, in 1873 to Norborne, Missouri, and in 1876 to Rock Port, Missouri. In 1891, William moved to Denver, Colorado, while his family moved to Oregon.

William began his career as a draftsman in Portland, Oregon, then as an architect in Wichita, Kansas. He moved to Los Angeles in the late 1890s, where he partnered with Seymour E. Locke in 1900 and Frank Dale Hudson from 1901 to 1931, after which he practiced solo and also worked as a city judge in San Marino, California. William was also an artist, and had his work shown in the Los Angeles Museum, Scottish Rite Cathedral, San Marino City Hall, and the Hospital for Tubercular Soldiers. He was also a member of the Society of Independent Artists and the Laguna Beach Art Association.

William married twice, to Octavia S. Winder in Sedgwick, Kansas on June 25, 1891, and then to Julia V. K. Wilkes Munsell in Chicago, Illinois on August 13, 1903. William and Julia had one daughter together.

William died in 1941 and was buried at Forest Home Cemetery in Milwaukee, Wisconsin.

=== Partnership ===
Hudson and Munsell practiced together from 1901 to 1931, and by 1905 had established themselves as "architects of the highest order" according to the Los Angeles Herald. Their most notable works are the Los Angeles County General Hospital Administration Building, the first Los Angeles County Hall of Records, and the Natural History Museum of Los Angeles County.

Hudson and Munsell are also well known for their residential designs, many of which have become Los Angeles Historic-Cultural Monuments. These houses, designed in a range of styles, including Arts and Crafts, Beaux Arts, and Colonial Revival, often feature large fireplaces decorated with art tiles, expansive upstairs landings that also serve as a family room or gathering place, extensive woodwork with wide crown molding, and built-in cabinetry. They were built for some of the wealthiest and most notable individuals in Los Angeles, including William May Garland, Frank S. Hicks, W. S. Hook, and others.

== Selected works ==
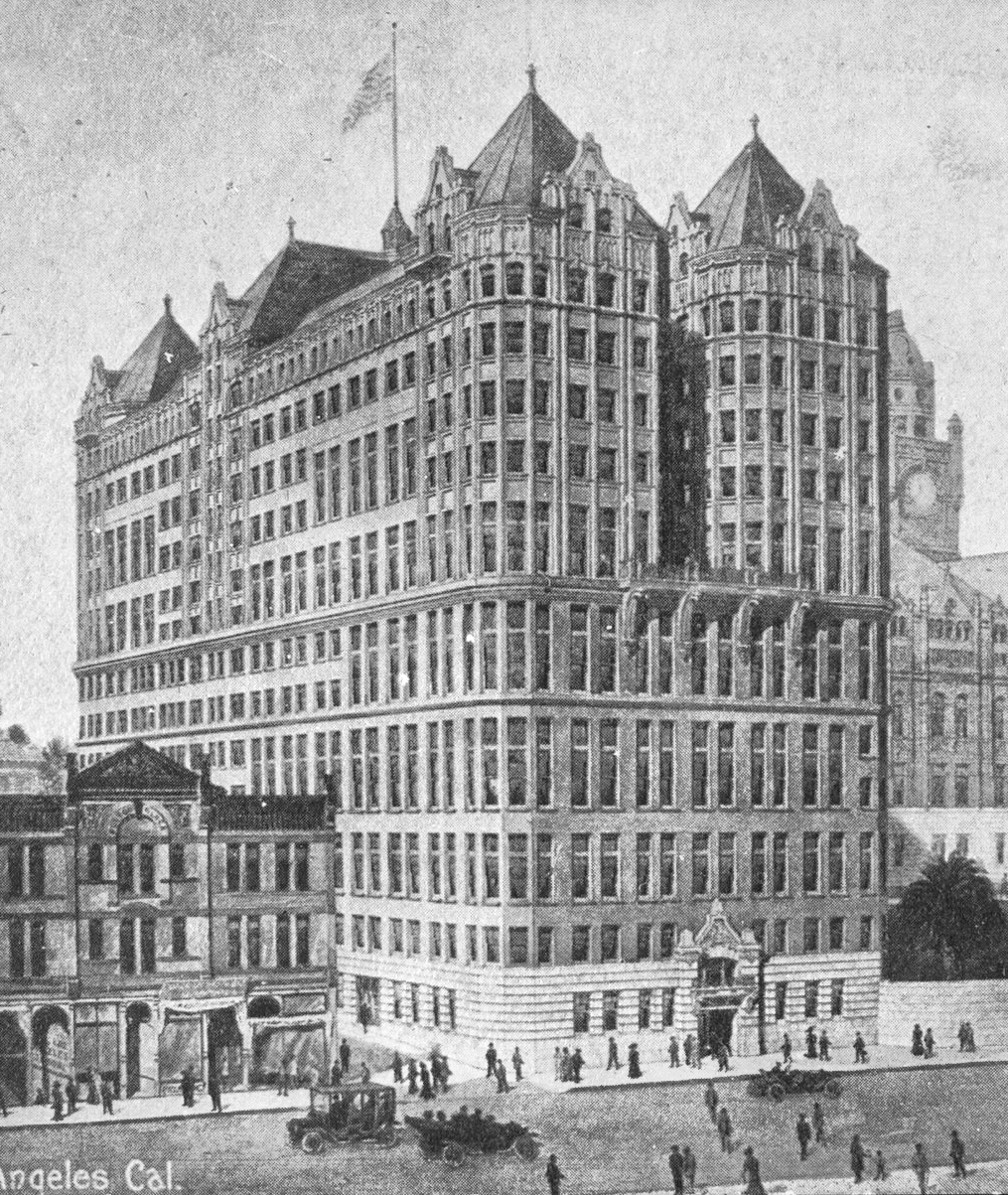
Los Angeles County Hall of Records (1911), demolished in 1973

Hudson and Munsell's most notable works were done during their partnership. These works, located in Los Angeles unless otherwise noted, include:

- Saint Anthony's Church, Long Beach, California (1901)
- Pease Building (1906), NRHP-listed
- Los Angeles County General Hospital Administration Building (1909)
- Benevolent and Protective Order of Elks lodge (1909)
- Masonic Building, Blue Lodge (1909)
- Hammel Building (1909)
- Fire Station No. 23 (1910), LAHCM No. 37
- Los Angeles County Hall of Records (1911), demolished in 1973

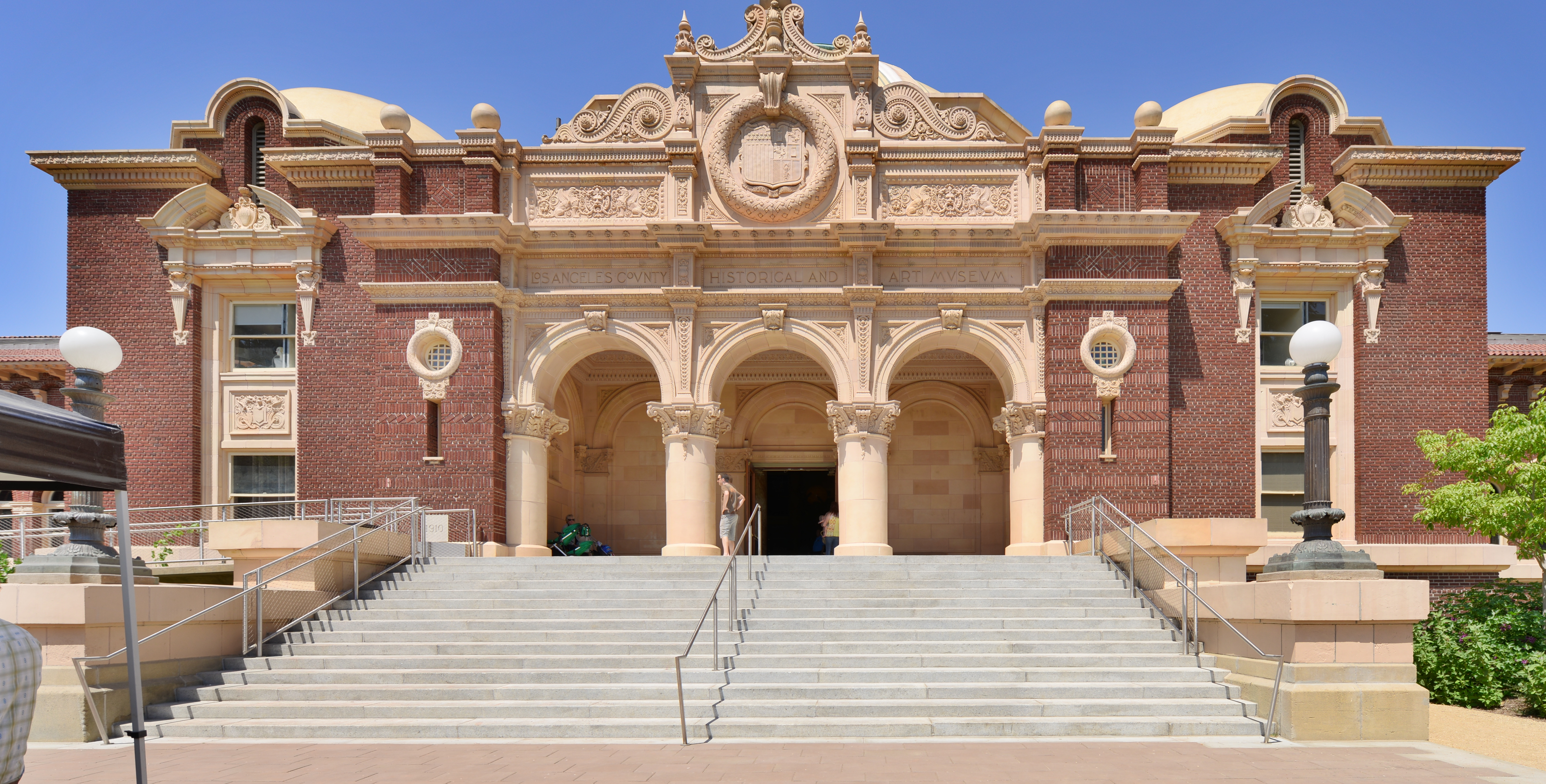
Natural History Museum of Los Angeles County

- Natural History Museum of Los Angeles County (1913), NRHP-listed
- Angel City Brewery Building (1913)

Notable Hudson and Munsell-designed homes in the Los Angeles area include:

- Cohn House (1902), LAHCM No. 84
- Charles I.D. Moore Residence (1907), LAHCM No. 1086

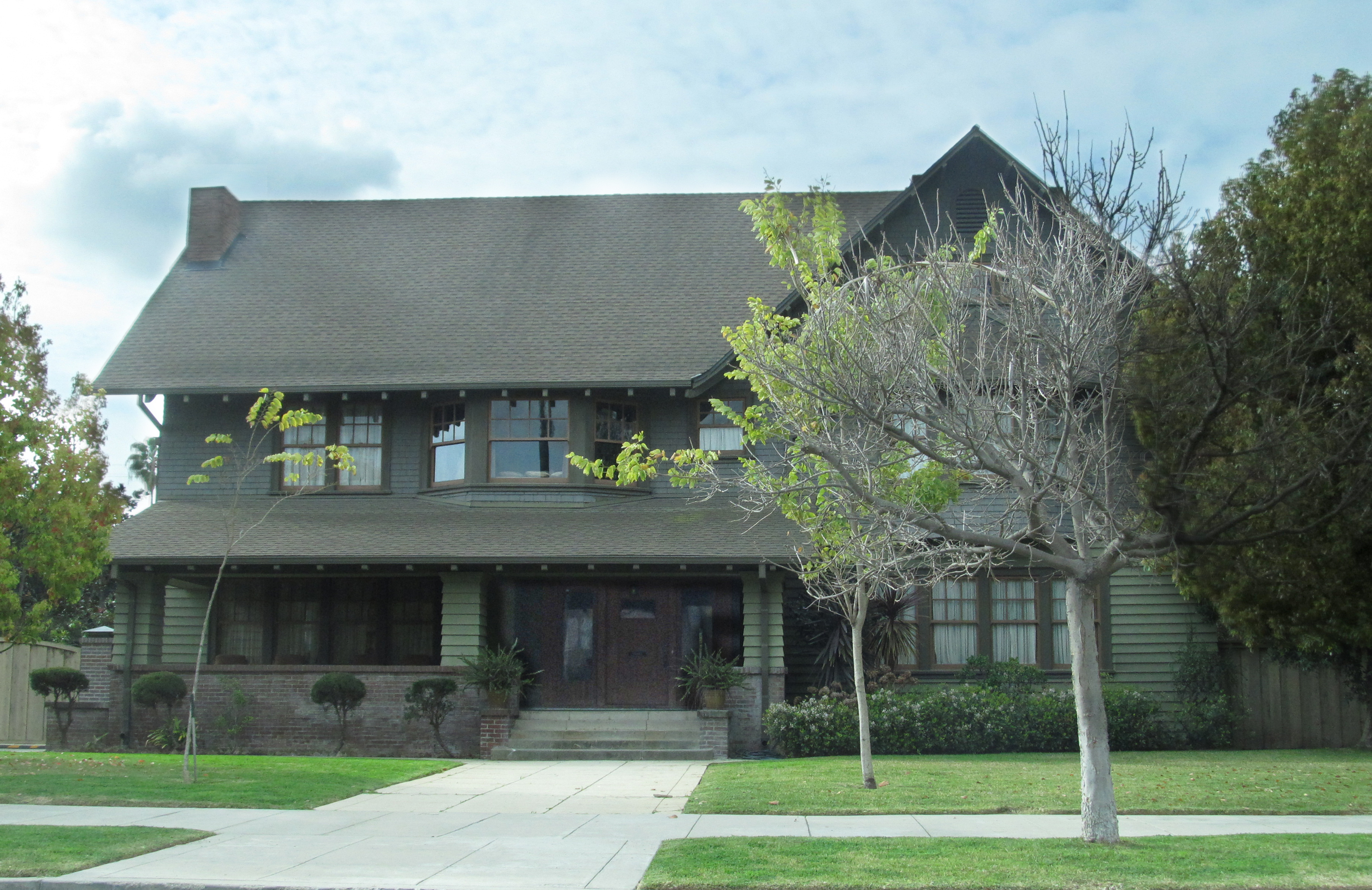
Kissam House

- Kissam House (1907), LAHCM No. 761
- Secondo Guasti House (1910), LAHCM No. 478
- Briggs Residence (1912), LAHCM No. 477
- Dr. Grandville MacGowan Home (1912), LAHCM No. 479
- Mrs. Susan Wilshire Residence (1912)

Hudson and Munsell also designed several schools in Los Angeles, including:

- Terminal School District school (1904)
- LAUSD 79th Street School (1924)
- LAUSD Murchison Street School (1925)
- LAUSD 95th Street School

== See also ==
- List of American architects
- List of people from Los Angeles
