= Richard Hudson =

Richard Hudson may refer to:

- Richard Hudson (American politician) (born 1971), U.S. Representative for North Carolina's 9th congressional district
- Richard Hudson (linguist) (born 1939), British linguist
- Richard Hudson (musician) (born 1948), British musician
- Richard Hudson (New Zealand politician) (1860–1953), Reform Party Member of Parliament in New Zealand
- Richard Hudson (sculptor) (born 1954), British sculptor, living in Spain
- Richard Hudson (stage designer) (born 1954), Zimbabwean stage designer
- Dick Hudson (American football, born 1940) (1940–2016), American football player
- Dick Hudson (American football, born 1898), American football player
