= Philip Costello =

American politician (died 2007)

Member of the Connecticut House of Representatives from the 72nd district
- In office 1971–1973
- Preceded by: Gustaf Carlson
- Succeeded by: James T. Healey

Member of the Connecticut State Senate from the 33rd district
- In office 1973–1975
- Preceded by: Thomas P. Mondani
- Succeeded by: Betty Hudson

Personal details
- Born: Grand Island, Nebraska, U.S.
- Died: April 14, 2007 Old Saybrook, Connecticut, U.S.
- Party: Republican
- Education: Yale College; Harvard Law School

Philip Costello (died April 14, 2007) was an American politician who served in the Connecticut House of Representatives from the 72nd district from 1971 to 1973 and the Connecticut State Senate from the 33rd district from 1973 to 1975.
