= Charles D. Metcalf =

US Air Force general (1933–2021)

Major General Charles D. Metcalf
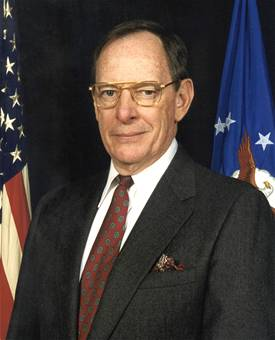
- Charles Metcalf, former Director of the National Museum of the United States Air Force
- Born: 1933; Amamosa, Iowa
- Died: 29 October 2021 (aged 88); Oakwood, Ohio
- Military career
- Allegiance: United States of America
- Branch: United States Air Force
- Service years: 1955-1991
- Rank: Major General
- Commands: Air Force Accounting and Finance Center
- Awards: Distinguished Service Medal; Defense Superior Service Medal; Legion of Merit; Meritorious Service Medal; Air Force Commendation Medal

Charles David Metcalf (19 June 1933 – 29 October 2021) served in the United States Air Force for 36 years, retiring as a major general. He went on to serve as the director of the National Museum of the United States Air Force from 1996 to 2010. He was a well-known civic leader in the Dayton, Ohio, area.

== Early life ==
Metcalf was born in Anamosa, Iowa, in 1933. He graduated from Anamosa High School in 1951. He then attended Coe College in Cedar Rapids, Iowa. He graduated in 1955, receiving a Bachelor of Arts degree economics and accounting. He was also a distinguished graduate of Coe College's Air Force Reserve Officer Training Corps program.

== Military career ==
He entered the Air Force in October 1955 and was assigned to the Air Force Hospital at Wimpole Park, England, as accounting and finance officer. In 1958, he became the base accounting and finance officer at Donaldson Air Force Base, South Carolina. He was transferred to George Air Force Base, California, in May 1959, again as a base level accounting and finance officer. He completed Squadron Officer School in 1962.

In September 1962, Metcalf became the first Air Force accounting and finance officer assigned in the Republic of Vietnam. He activated that country's first military finance office at Tan Son Nhut Air Base. After his Vietnam tour, Metcalf was selected to attend graduate school at Michigan State University at East Lansing, receiving a master's degree in business administration in 1964.

Metcalf was assigned to Headquarters Air Defense Command at Ent Air Force Base, Colorado, in September 1964, where he served as chief of the Budget Operations Division. In August 1967, he was assigned to the Office of Aerospace Programs in The Pentagon in Washington, D.C. While at the Pentagon, he also served as executive officer to the Assistant Secretary of the Air Force for Financial Management. He then returned to Aerospace Defense Command headquarters and served for two years as deputy director of budget.

In 1973, Metcalf was selected to attend Air War College at Maxwell Air Force Base, Alabama. He graduated in June 1974, and was assigned to Scott Air Force Base, Illinois, as director of budget for the Military Airlift Command. He returned to Pentagon in August 1975 and served as deputy chief of the Air Force Budget Directorate's Operations Appropriation Division. In July 1976, he returned to Scott Air Force Base as Military Airlift Command's comptroller. In June 1982, he was assigned to the Office of the Comptroller of the Air Force in Washington, D.C., as deputy director of budget, where he was promoted to brigadier general.

In July 1983, he became comptroller for Air Force Logistics Command at Wright-Patterson Air Force Base, Ohio. During his tenure as the Air Force Logistic Command comptroller, he attended Harvard University’s Executive Development Program in Cambridge, Massachusetts. In August 1986, he was promoted to major general.

In 1988, General Metcalf took command of the Air Force Accounting and Finance Center (now part of the Defense Finance and Accounting Service). At that time the center was located at Lowry Air Force Base in Denver, Colorado. As commander of the finance center, he was responsible for the Air Force’s worldwide accounting and finance network, paying all Air Force active duty, Air National Guard, Air Force Reserve, and retired members, and accounting for all funds appropriated to the Air Force by the United States Congress. During this period, Metcalf also served as Deputy Assistant Secretary of the Air Force for Accounting and Deputy Director of the Defense Security Assistance Agency. He filled these three roles concurrently until he retired from the Air Force on 1 February 1991.

General Metcalf’s military decorations include the Distinguished Service Medal with one oak leaf cluster, the Defense Superior Service Medal, the Legion of Merit, Meritorious Service Medal with three oak leaf clusters, and Air Force Commendation Medal.

== Air Force Museum ==
In 1996, Metcalf became Director of the National Museum of the United States Air Force, commonly called “the Air Force Museum.” The museum is located on Wright-Patterson Air Force Base, and is the world's largest and oldest military aviation museum.

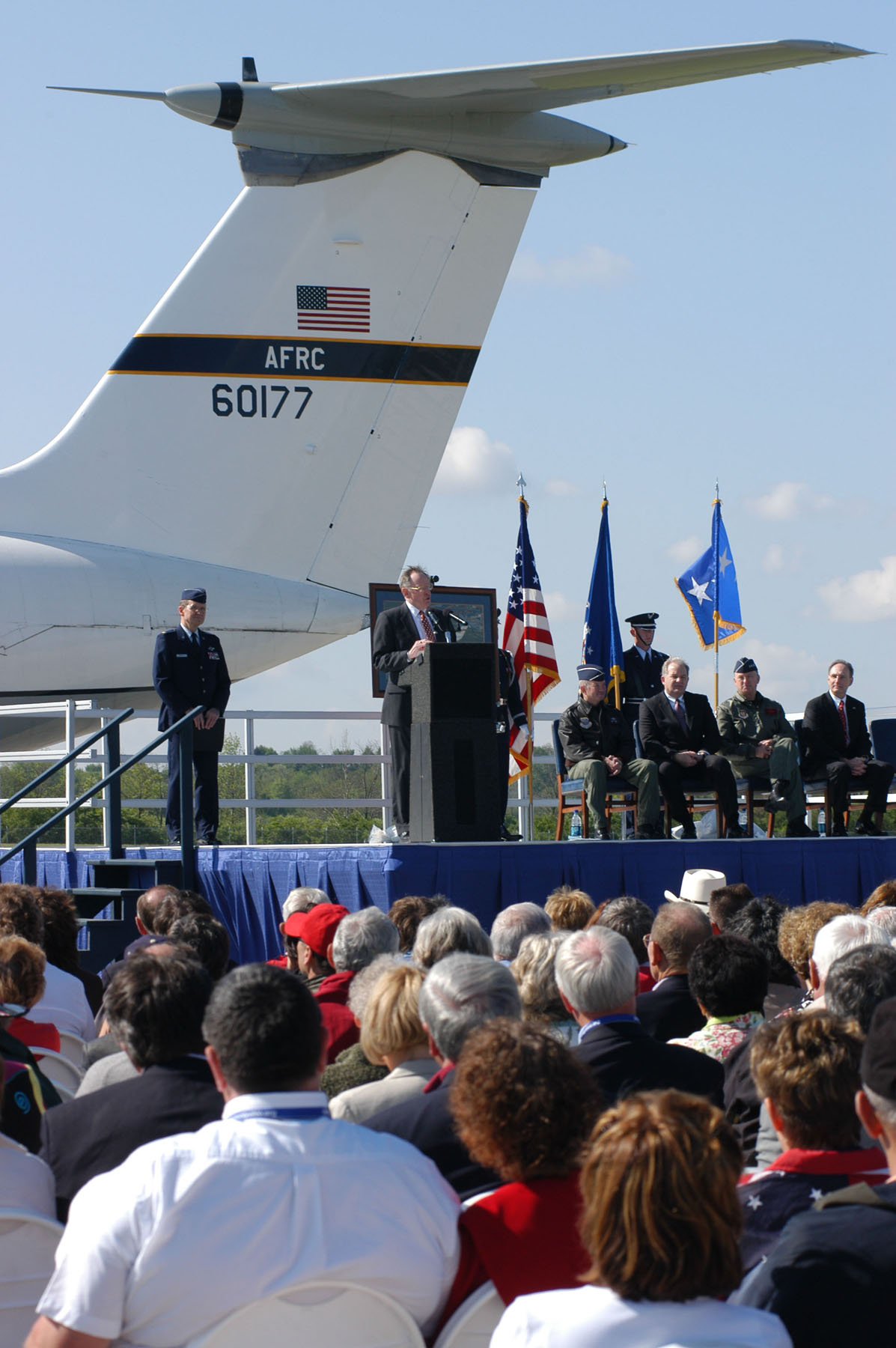
Charles Metcalf accepting the C-141 "Hanoi Taxi" into museum collection after its last flight

As museum director, Metcalf oversees 96 permanent federal civil service employees and 475 volunteers who design and maintain exhibits, conserve collection artifacts, conduct research, restore vintage aircraft, educate the public about aviation history, plan special events, and work in the museum's administrative offices. He is responsible for a building complex with 1,700,000 square feet (160,000 m^{2}) of public exhibit space (17 acres of indoor space). The museum collection has more than 400 aircraft and other large aerospace vehicles plus thousands of aviation artifacts on display. In addition to the main museum building, a large aircraft hangar annex houses retired Air Force One Presidential aircraft along with X-type test vehicles. The museum also has an aviation art gallery, a six-story IMAX theatre that seat 500 viewers, and a full-motion simulator that gives the sensation of flying a jet fighter. Outside on the museum grounds, there is an air park with numerous large aircraft along with a World War II control tower. In addition, Metcalf oversees an inventory of more than 6,000 aerospace vehicles and historically valuable artifacts that are on loan to 450 civilian museums, cities, and veteran organizations throughout the United States.

Every year, Metcalf and his staff host approximately 800 events that bring government dignitaries, military leaders, war heroes, corporate executive, military reunion groups, and aviation enthusiasts to the museum. These events include the biennial Dawn Patrol Rendezvous World War I fly-in, the annual Radio-Controlled Model Aircraft Air Show, outdoor and indoor concerts featuring the Air Force Band of Flight, and the Wings and Things guest lecture series. His education program reaches over 100,000 students every year. Metcalf also makes the museum available for many formal military ceremonies.

Metcalf has greatly expanded the museum and its collection during his tenure. The 200,000-square-foot (19,000 m^{2}) Cold War Gallery was completed in 2003. Its centerpiece is a B-2 bomber. The latest addition to the museum is a $3.2 million Missile and Space Gallery which was opened in 2004. Currently the museum is planning to build a 53,000-square-foot (4,900 m^{2}) addition to house a Space Gallery.

In 2005, Metcalf was promoted to the Senior Executive Service, the highest federal civilian rank below Presidential appointees.

As director of the Air Force Museum, Metcalf plays a leading role in overseeing the United States Air Force Heritage Program, which includes 12 field museums and 260 domestic and international heritage sites. This program manages approximately 31,000 military aviation items that are displayed at Air Force bases around the world.

General Metcalf retired from civilian service on 16 December 2010 and was replaced by Lt. Gen. (ret) John L Hudson.

== Community leader ==
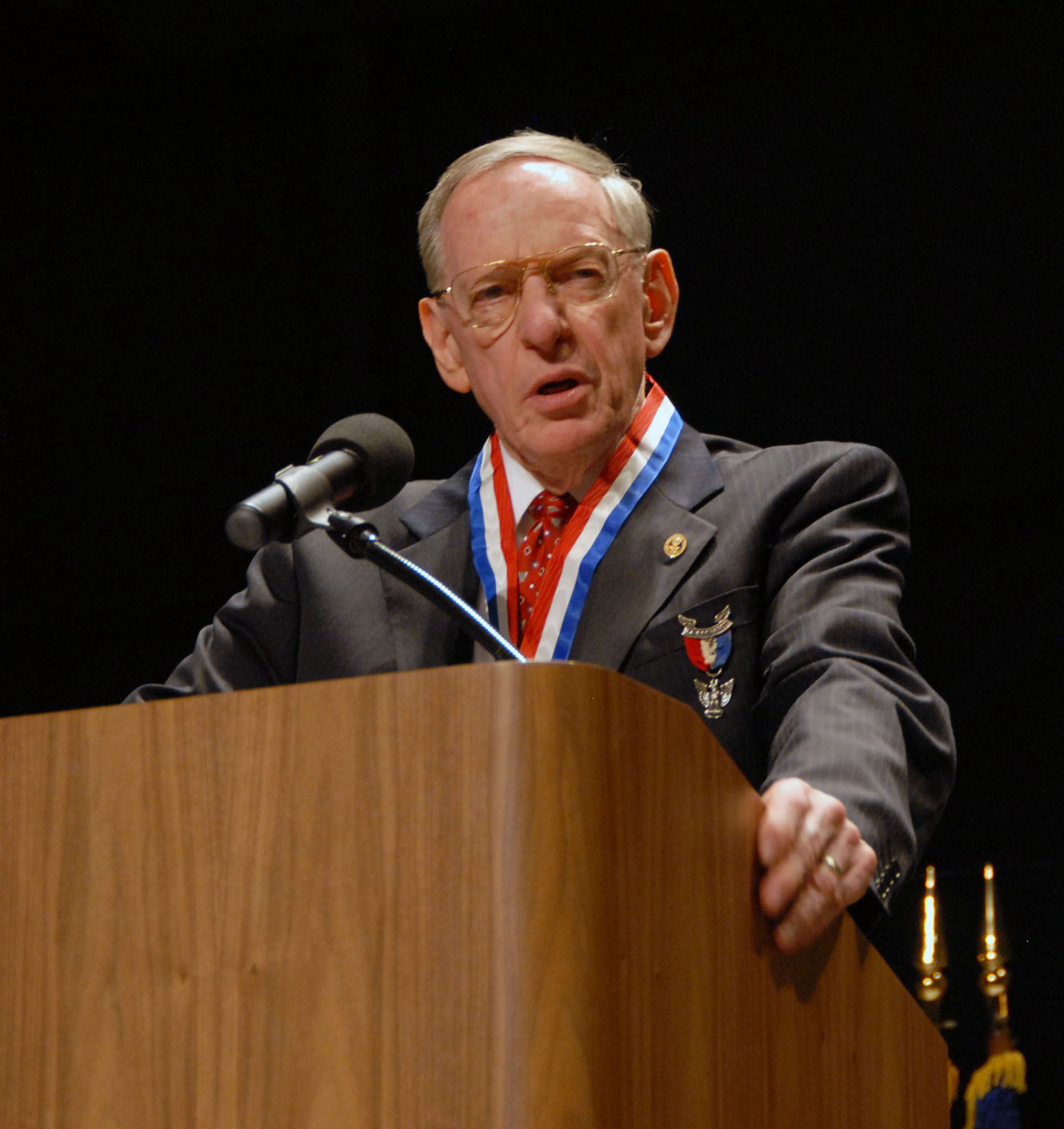
Charles Metcalf accepting his Distinguished Eagle Scout Award

As a youth Metcalf earned the Boy Scouts of America's (BSA) Eagle Scout rank on August 19, 1949. He continued his involvement the BSA as a member of the BSA's Leadership and Standards Committee and was recognized on October 27, 2009 with BSA's Distinguished Eagle Scout Award. In addition to his work at the Air Force museum, General Metcalf is the Central Region Vice President of the Boy Scouts of America. He is a former member of the Oakwood, Ohio City Council, and served on the Corporate Development Board of Trustees for Dayton, Ohio. He has served as chairman of the Board of Directors for the Greater Dayton United Way campaign, and as a member of the Board of Directors for Greater Dayton Public Television. He has also served as a member of Michigan State University's National Alumni Board.
