= Hammett, Georgia =

Unincorporated community in Georgia, U.S.

Coordinates: 32°39′24″N 84°01′08″W

Hammett is an unincorporated community in Crawford County, in the U.S. state of Georgia.

== History ==
A post office called Hammett was established in 1904, and remained in operation until 1940. The community was named after the Hammett brothers, proprietors of a local sawmill.
