= Alice Hudson =

American librarian and cartographic curator (1947–2024)

- Born: March 17, 1947; Oak Ridge, Tennessee, U.S.
- Died: November 6, 2024 (aged 77); New York City, U.S.
- Education: Middle Tennessee State University; Vanderbilt Peabody College
- Occupation(s): Librarian, cartographic curator
- Employer: New York Public Library (1970–2009)

Alice Hudson (March 17, 1947 – November 6, 2024) was an American librarian and cartographic curator who served as the chief of the Lionel Pincus and Princess Firyal Map Division at the New York Public Library from 1981 to 2009. She co-founded the New York Map Society in 1977 and contributed to the preservation, curation, and accessibility of historical maps.

== Early life ==
Hudson was born in Oak Ridge, Tennessee on March 17, 1947. Her father, George Hudson, worked as an electrician at the Y-12 National Security Complex, while her mother, Eva Hudson (née Borgers), was a teacher. As a teenager, Hudson worked at the Donnell Library Center in Manhattan as a page. She initially planned to pursue a career as a United Nations translator. However, after completing a degree at Middle Tennessee State University and earning a Master of Library Science at Vanderbilt Peabody College, her academic interests shifted toward geography, which she credited to a required course during her studies.

== Career ==
In 1970, Hudson joined the New York Public Library (NYPL) Lionel Pincus and Princess Firyal Map Division. By 1978, she had been promoted to assistant chief, and in 1981, she became the division's chief, a position she held until her retirement in 2009. In 1977, Hudson helped establish the New York Map Society, a group focused on cartographic study and education. During her tenure at the NYPL, the map collection expanded, growing to include more than 400,000 maps and 24,000 atlases. She organized various exhibitions, including one at the Boston Public Library from 2015 to 2016 that highlighted historical contributions by women to the field of mapmaking.

Hudson's work included discovering maps created by women or in which women had a significant role. With co-researcher Mary Ritzlin, Hudson set out to discover the historical role of women in cartography. In their 1989 edition of "Women in Cartography" they found 150 women cartographers prior to the 20th century. The 1998 edition of their work identified two hundred names, and the 2000 edition listed three hundred from that period.

Hudson contributed to projects such as The Historical Atlas of New York City and co-curated the exhibition "Heading West/Touring West" in 2001. She also played a role in mentoring scholars and students, teaching courses on cartography and map librarianship at institutions like Pratt Institute. Among the recognition Hudson received was the Sloan Public Service Award in 2001, presented by the Fund for the City of New York. Additionally, the New York Map Society inaugurated the Alice Hudson Award in 2018, which acknowledges achievements in geography and mapmaking by students at Hunter College.

== Personal life and death ==
Hudson had a nephew and a grandniece. She died from complications related to kidney disease in Manhattan, on November 6, 2024, at the age of 77.
