= Morris Hudson =

English footballer

Personal information
- Full name: Morris Hudson
- Date of birth: 12 September 1930
- Place of birth: Barnsley, England
- Date of death: 2007 (aged 76–77)
- Place of death: Barnsley, England
- Position: Right back

Senior career*
| Years | Team | Apps | (Gls) |
| 1950–1955 | Barnsley | 36 | (0) |
| 1955–1956 | Bradford City | 4 | (0) |
- Swaithe Main Athletic
| Total | | 40 | (0) |
- * Club domestic league appearances and goals

Morris Hudson (12 September 1930 – 2007) is an English former professional footballer who played as a right back.

== Career ==
Born in Barnsley, Hudson played for Barnsley, making 36 Football League appearances. He signed for Bradford City in July 1955, leaving the club in 1956 to sign for Swaithe Main Athletic. During his time with Bradford City he made four appearances in the Football League.

== Sources ==
- Frost, Terry (1988). Bradford City A Complete Record 1903-1988. Breedon Books Sport. ISBN 0-907969-38-0.
