= Amos Hudson =

American politician

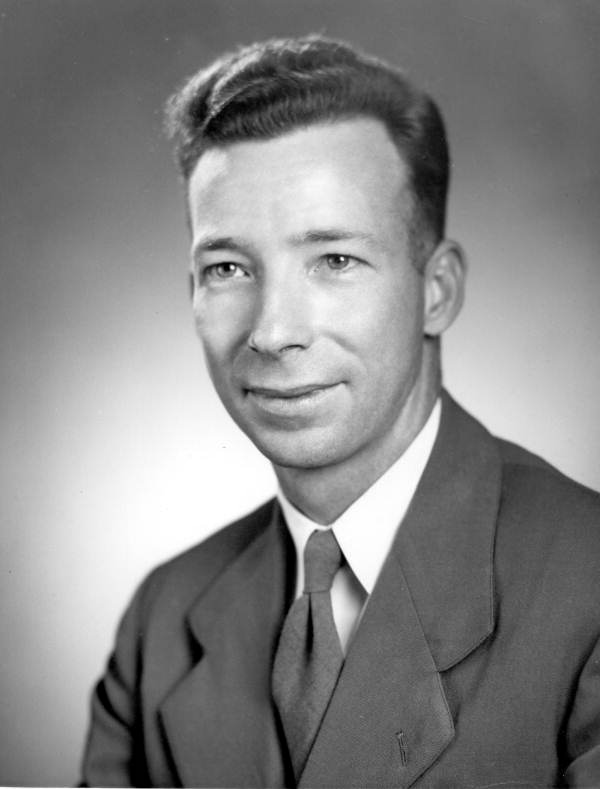
- Hudson in 1949

Member of the Florida House of Representatives from Washington County
- In office 1949

Personal details
- Born: October 6, 1918 Washington County, Florida, U.S.
- Died: March 28, 1993 (aged 74)
- Party: Democratic

Amos O. Hudson (October 6, 1918 – March 28, 1993) was a lawyer and American politician. He served as a Democratic Party member of the Florida House of Representatives.

== Life and career ==
Hudson was born in Washington County, Florida.

Hudson served in World War II. He was a member of the Florida House of Representatives in 1949.

Hudson died on March 28, 1993, at the age of 74.
