= Joseph Hudson (tobacconist) =

British tobacconist (1778–1854)

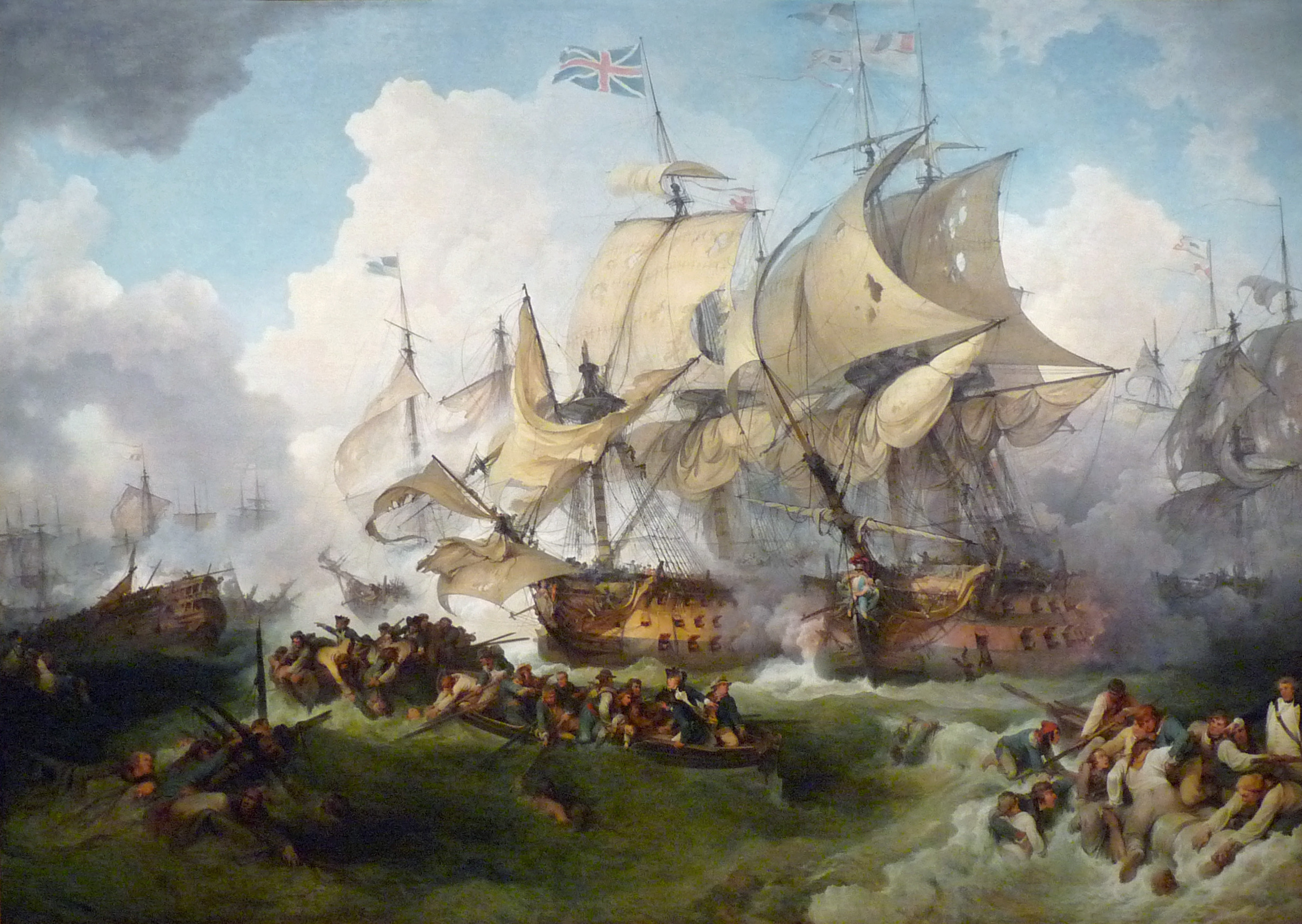
The Battle of the First of June, 1794, Philippe-Jacques de Loutherbourg, 1795. National Maritime Museum, Greenwich.

Joseph Hudson (1778–1854) was a veteran of the battle of the Glorious First of June and later a tobacconist to the British royal family who ran a cigar divan in Oxford Street, London.

== Early life ==
Hudson was born in 1778. In 1794 he was a midshipman in the Royal Navy who served under Admiral Earl Howe during the battle of the Glorious First of June (Loutherbourg, 1794) between the British and French navies during the French Revolutionary Wars.

== Career ==
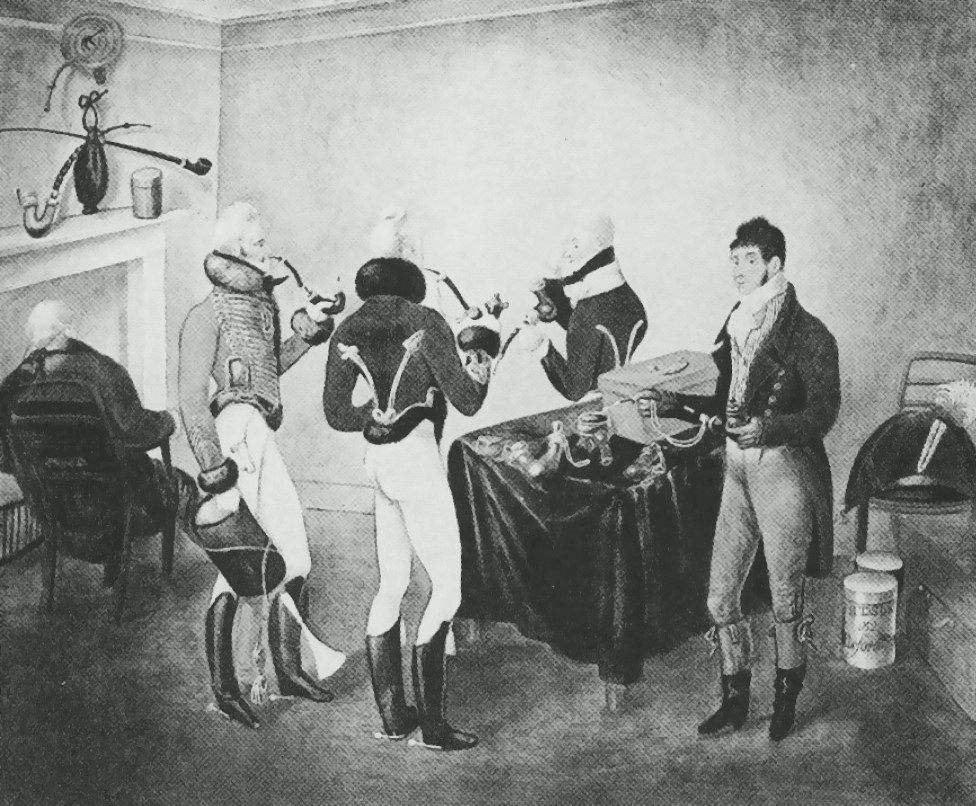
A scene at Ipswich Barracks, possibly featuring Joseph Hudson on the right.

Hudson was a tobacconist to the British royal family. His premises were at 132 Oxford Street where he ran a cigar divan frequented by sporting figures.

== Death ==
Hudson died in 1854. He is buried at Kensal Green Cemetery. His Will is held by the British National Archives at Kew. In October 2015, it was reported that his mausoleum (1850), which is Grade II listed, had been placed on the Heritage at Risk Register with Historic England due to potential damage from plant growth.

== See also ==
- Chartres Biron (a descendant)
