= James H. Hudson =

American judge (1877–1947)

James Hudson

Associate Justice of the Maine Supreme Judicial Court
- In office November 20, 1933 – August 21, 1947
- Appointed by: Louis J. Brann

Personal details
- Born: March 21, 1878 Guilford, Maine, U.S.
- Died: August 21, 1947 (aged 69) Augusta, Maine, U.S.
- Education: Colby College; Harvard Law School

James Henry Hudson (March 21, 1878 – August 21, 1947) was an American lawyer and jurist who served as an associate justice of the Maine Supreme Judicial Court from November 20, 1933, to August 21, 1947.

== Background ==
Born in Guilford, Hudson was admitted to the Maine State Bar in 1903, and entered into private practice in partnership with his father. Hudson was a Piscataquis county attorney from 1913 to 1919. He then served as a Maine probate judge until his appointment to the state supreme court in 1933.

Hudson had a heart attack on August 18, 1947, and died at the Augusta General Hospital.
