= Betty Hudson =

American politician (1931–2016)

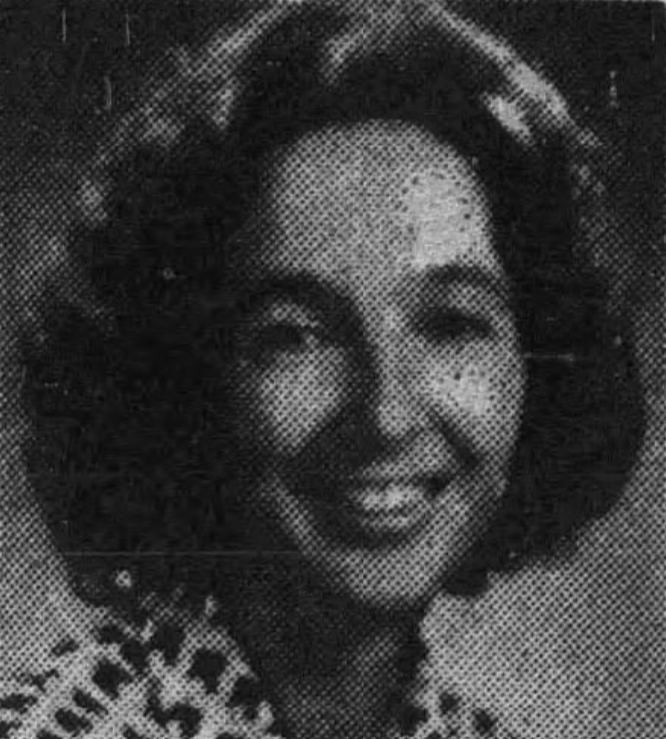

Member of the Connecticut Senate from the 33rd district
- In office 1975–1979
- Preceded by: Philip Costello
- Succeeded by: Frederick Knous

Personal details
- Born: Betty Bagi; March 5, 1931 Port Chester, New York, U.S.
- Died: October 9, 2016 (aged 85) North Branford, Connecticut, U.S.
- Party: Democratic
- Spouse: Donald Hudson (separated)
- Children: 2
- Education: Michigan State University

Betty Hudson (née Bagi; March 5, 1931 – October 9, 2016) was an American politician who served in the Connecticut State Senate from 1975 to 1979, representing the 33rd district as a Democrat.

== Personal life ==
Hudson was born on March 5, 1931, in Port Chester, New York. She had an identical twin sister, Marie. She graduated from Stamford High School and Michigan State University.

Hudson was married to Donald Hudson, with whom she moved to Connecticut and had two children. The couple later separated, and Hudson moved to Simsbury with a friend, where she became involved in community issues, including the construction of a park adjacent to the Old Drake Hill Flower Bridge. Hudson sold her house to the town of Simsbury in 2014, and the property was demolished to make way for the park.

Hudson died on October 9, 2016, in North Branford, Connecticut. She was 85.

== Political career ==
Hudson was elected to the Connecticut State Senate in 1974, and she served two terms representing the 33rd district as a Democrat. She did not run for reelection in 1978 and was succeeded by fellow Democrat Frederick Knous.
