= John L. Hudson =

US Air Force general

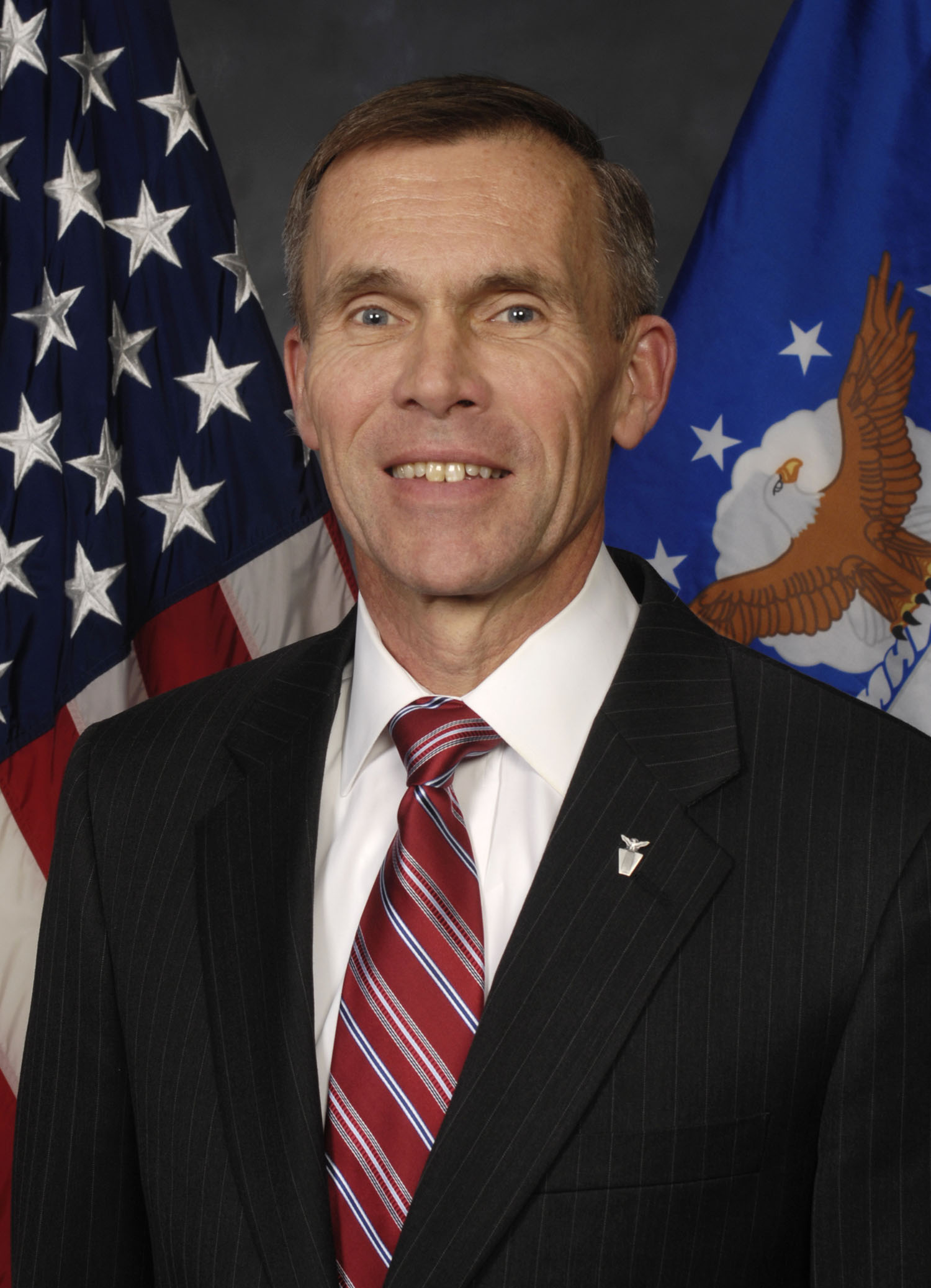
- Born: New York, U.S.
- Alma mater: United States Air Force Academy; Purdue University School of Aeronautics and Astronautics; Naval War College; Salve Regina University
- Military career
- Allegiance: United States
- Branch: United States Air Force

John L. "Jack" Hudson is a retired lieutenant general in the U.S. Air Force. He was Commander, Aeronautical Systems Center, Wright-Patterson Air Force Base, Ohio (WPAFB). Hudson also served as a member of the Senior Executive Service as the Director of the National Museum of the United States Air Force at WPAFB from 2009 to 2018.

== Biography ==
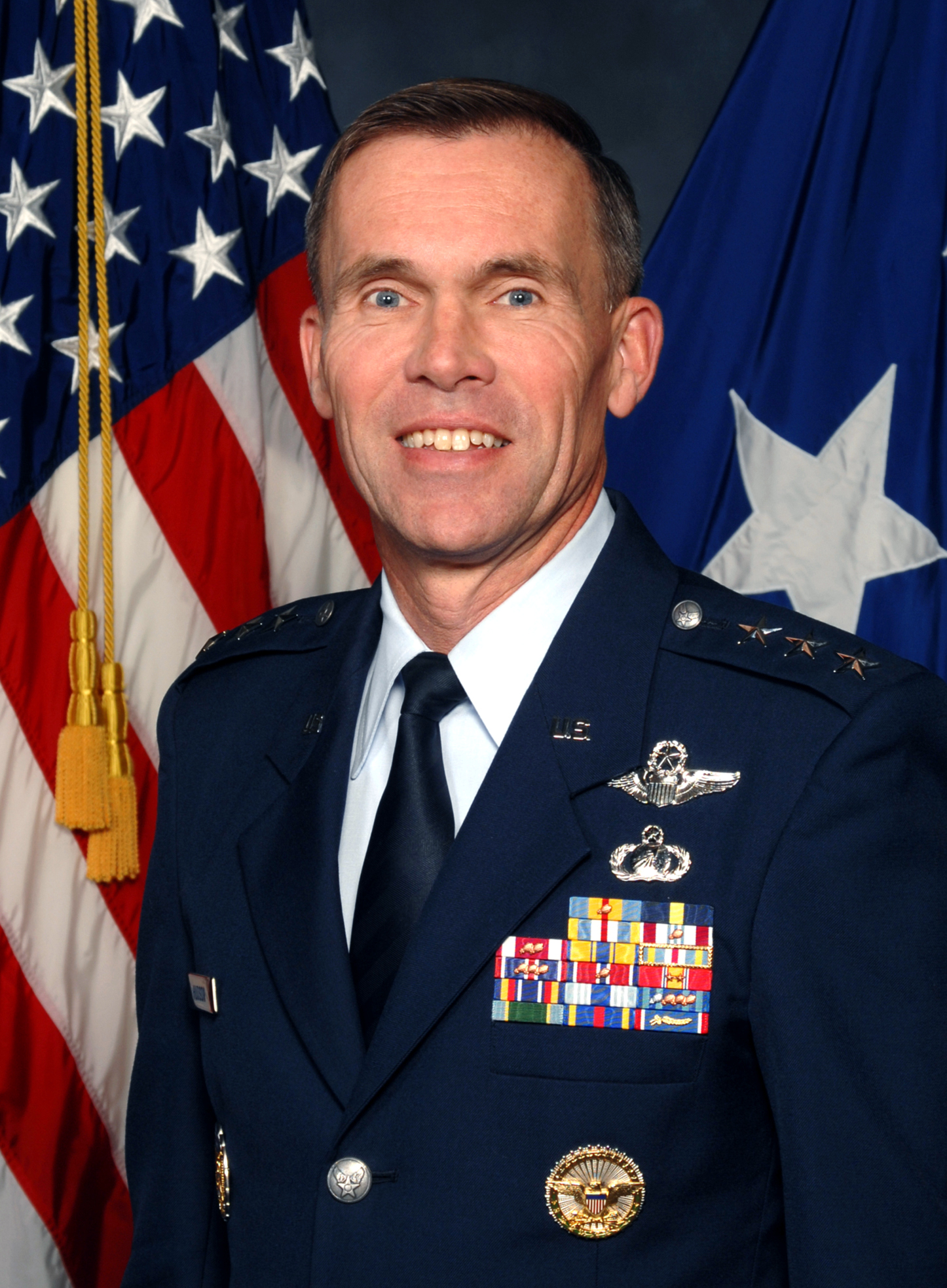
Lt. Gen. John L. Hudson in 2006

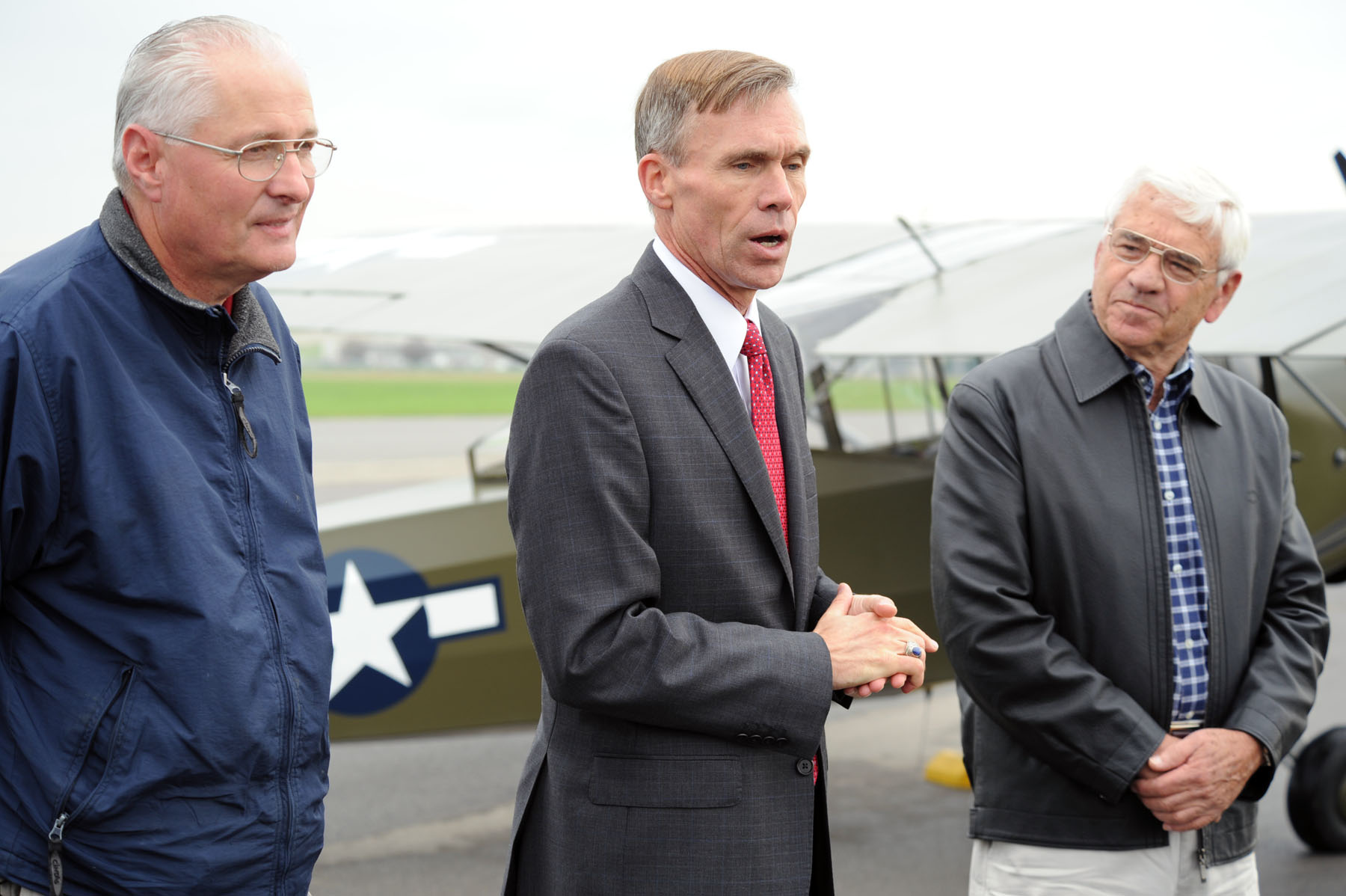
Gen. Hudson (center) accepting a donation of a restored Taylorcraft L-2 for the museum on 28 September 2011. Also pictured are Dick Valladao (right), the aircraft donor and pilot, and Roger Deere, chief of the museum's Restoration Division

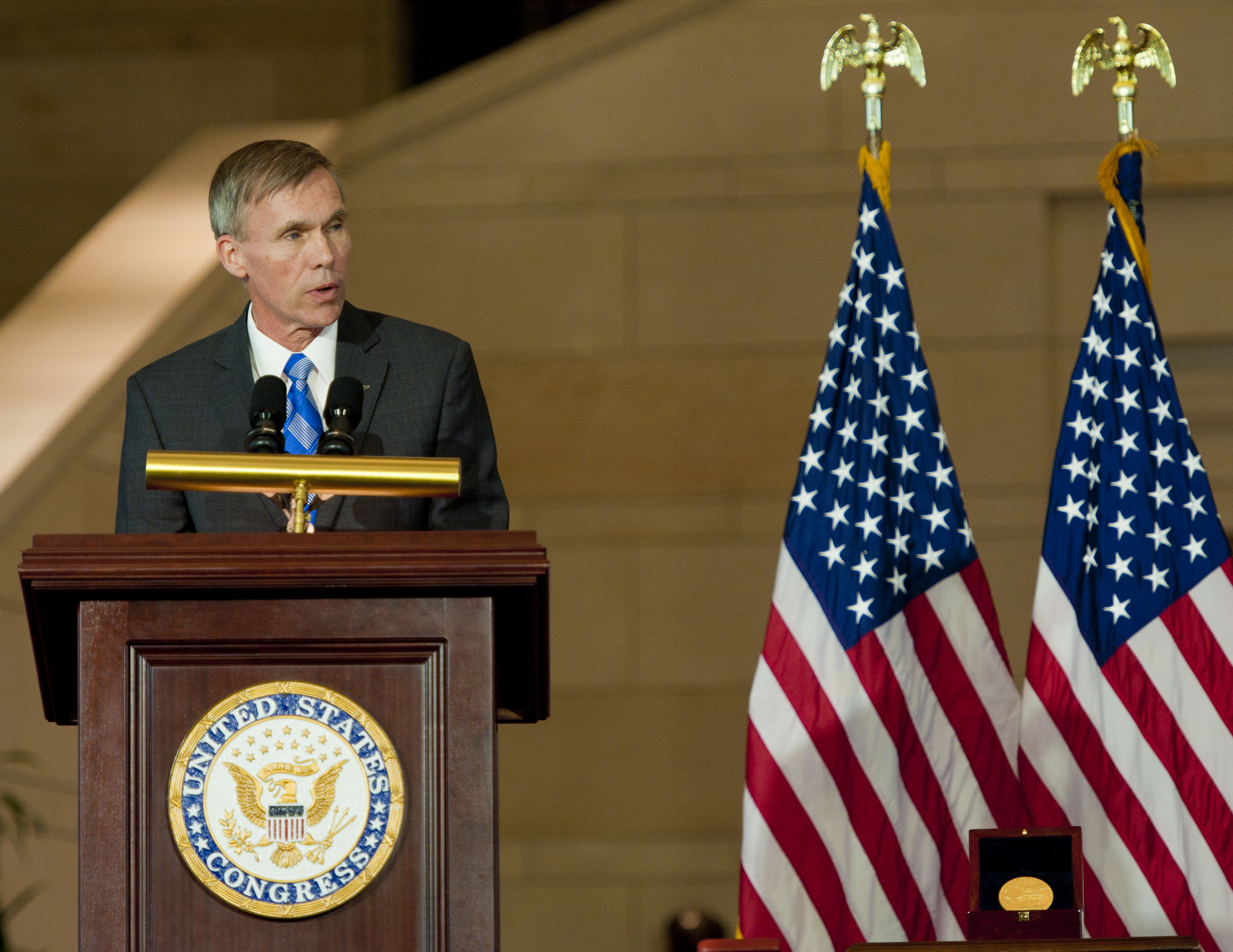
Gen. John Hudson speaks to guests at the Doolittle Raiders Congressional Gold Medal Presentation at Emancipation Hall where he accepted the medal on behalf of the Raiders on April 15, 2015.

General Hudson was born in New York state. Raised in St. Francisville, Louisiana, he was commissioned in 1973 as a distinguished graduate of the U.S. Air Force Academy. He has served as a T-38 instructor pilot; an A-10 pilot, instructor pilot and flight examiner; and as a test pilot at Edwards AFB, Calif. The general has served on the Air Staff and as the director of several Air Force and joint system program offices, as the senior military assistant to the Under Secretary for Defense for Acquisition and Technology, and as Program Executive Officer and Program Director, Joint Strike Fighter Program, Office of the Assistant Secretary of the Navy for Research, Development and Acquisition. Prior to assuming the command of ASC, he was Assistant Deputy Under Secretary of the Air Force for International Affairs.

General Hudson earned the Command Pilot rating with more than 3,500 flying hours in the A-10, A-7, T-38 and 42 other types of aircraft.

General Hudson remained at WPAFB after retirement, assuming the newly created position of Deputy Director of the National Museum of the United States Air Force.

On 23 December 2010, Hudson assumed the director's position at the museum upon the retirement of his predecessor, Maj. Gen. (ret.) Charles D. Metcalf. He retired from this position on Oct. 5, 2018.

== Education ==
- 1973 Distinguished graduate, Bachelor of Science degree in astronautical engineering, U.S. Air Force Academy, Colorado Springs, Colo.
- 1974 Master of Science degree in aeronautics and astronautics, Purdue University, Lafayette, Ind.
- 1982 Distinguished graduate, USAF Test Pilot School, Edwards AFB, Calif.
- 1987 Distinguished graduate, Air Command and Staff College, Maxwell AFB, Ala.
- 1991 Distinguished graduate, Naval War College, Newport, R.I.
- 1991 Master of Arts degree in national security and strategic studies, Naval War College, Newport, R.I.
- 1993 Master of Science degree in management, Salve Regina University
- 1993 Defense Systems Management College, Fort Belvoir, Va.
- 1997 Executive Program Management Course, Fort Belvoir, Va.
- 1997 Executive Development Program, Cornell University

== Assignments ==
1. June 1973 – May 1974, graduate student, Air Force Institute of Technology, Purdue University, Lafayette, Ind.
2. June 1974 – June 1975, student, undergraduate pilot training, Sheppard AFB, Texas
3. July 1975 – May 1978, T-38 instructor pilot, 90th Flying Training Squadron, Sheppard AFB, Texas
4. May 1978 – February 1979, student, T-38 Fighter Lead-in Training, Holloman AFB, N.M., later, student, A-10 Qualification Training, Davis-Monthan AFB, Ariz.
5. March 1979 – December 1981, A-10 pilot, instructor pilot and flight examiner, 510th Tactical Fighter Squadron, Royal Air Force Bentwaters, England
6. January 1982 – June 1984, student, U.S. Air Force Test Pilot School, and A-10 test pilot, A-10 Combined Test Force, Edwards AFB, Calif.
7. June 1984 – June 1986, A-7 and T-38 instructor test pilot, U.S. Air Force Test Pilot School, Edwards AFB, Calif.
8. July 1986 – June 1987, student, Air Command and Staff College, Maxwell AFB, Ala.
9. July 1987 – July 1990, program element monitor, F-117 and Tri-Service Standoff Attack Missile programs, the Pentagon, Washington, D.C.
10. July 1990 – July 1991, student, Naval War College, Newport, R.I.
11. July 1991 – July 1993, Director of Projects, Tri-Service Standoff Attack Missile System Program Office, Wright-Patterson AFB, Ohio
12. July 1993 – July 1994, executive officer to the Air Force Vice Chief of Staff, Headquarters U.S. Air Force, Washington, D.C.
13. July 1994 – May 1996, Director, Flight Training System Program Office, Wright-Patterson AFB, Ohio
14. May 1996 – June 1997, Director, F-15 System Program Office, Robins AFB, Ga.
15. June 1997 – September 1997, Deputy for Aeronautical Systems, Strategic and Tactical Systems, Office of the Under Secretary of Defense for Acquisition and Technology, the Pentagon, Washington, D.C.
16. September 1997 - May 1999, senior military assistant to the Under Secretary of Defense for Acquisition and Technology, the Pentagon, Washington, D.C.
17. May 1999 – October 2001, Deputy Director, Joint Strike Fighter Program, Office of the Assistant Secretary of the Air Force for Acquisition, Arlington, Va.
18. October 2001 – June 2004, Program Executive Officer and Program Director, Joint Strike Fighter Program, Office of the Assistant Secretary of the Navy for Research, Development and Acquisition, Arlington, Va.
19. July 2004 – August 2005, Assistant Deputy Under Secretary of the Air Force for International Affairs, Office of the Under Secretary of the Air Force, Headquarters U.S. Air Force, Washington, D.C.
20. August 2005 – October 2009, Commander, Aeronautical Systems Center, Wright-Patterson AFB, Ohio
21. October 2009, retirement from military service
22. October 2009 - October 2018, Director, National Museum of the United States Air Force

== Flight Experience ==
- Rating: Command Pilot
- Flight hours: More than 3,500
- Aircraft flown: A-10, A-7, T-38 and 42 other types of aircraft

== Awards and decorations ==
- Defense Distinguished Service Medal with oak leaf cluster
- Navy Distinguished Service Medal
- Defense Superior Service Medal
- Legion of Merit
- Defense Meritorious Service Medal with oak leaf cluster
- Meritorious Service Medal with two oak leaf clusters
- Air Force Commendation Medal

== Other Achievements ==
- 2003 Distinguished Engineering Alumnus, Purdue University
- 2003 Outstanding Aerospace Engineer, Purdue University
- 2003 Distinguished Alumnus, USAF Test Pilot School

== Promotions ==
1. Second Lieutenant June 6, 1973
2. First Lieutenant June 6, 1975
3. Captain June 6, 1977
4. Major August 1, 1984
5. Lieutenant Colonel May 1, 1989
6. Colonel January 1, 1993
7. Brigadier General March 1, 1999
8. Major General February 1, 2003
9. Lieutenant General August 15, 2005
