= Interstate 295 (Delaware–Pennsylvania) =

Interstate Highway in the US states of Delaware, New Jersey, and Pennsylvania

Interstate 295
- I-295 highlighted in red

Route information
- Auxiliary route of I-95
- Maintained by DelDOT, DRBA, NJDOT, DRJTBC, and PennDOT
- Length: 92.3 mi (148.5 km)
- Existed: 1958–present
- History: Finalized in 1994; Completed in 2018
- NHS: Entire route

Major junctions
- South end: I-95 / US 202 / I-495 / DE 141 near Newport, Delaware
- US 13 / US 40 near New Castle, Delaware; N.J. Turnpike / US 40 / US 130 / Route 49 in Pennsville Township, New Jersey; US 130 in Logan Township, New Jersey; I-76 / Route 42 in Bellmawr, New Jersey; US 30 in Barrington, New Jersey; Route 73 in Mount Laurel, New Jersey; US 130 in Bordentown Township, New Jersey; I-195 / Route 29 in Hamilton Township, Mercer County, New Jersey; US 1 in Lawrence Township, Mercer County, New Jersey and Middletown Township, Bucks County, Pennsylvania
- West end: I-95 in Bristol Township, Bucks County, Pennsylvania

Location
- Country: United States
- States: Delaware, New Jersey, Pennsylvania
- Counties: Delaware: New Castle; New Jersey: Salem, Gloucester, Camden, Burlington, Mercer; Pennsylvania: Bucks

Highway system
- Interstate Highway System; Main; Auxiliary; Suffixed; Business; Future
← DE 286	Delaware	→ DE 299
← I-287	New Jersey	→ Route 300
← PA 294	Pennsylvania	→ PA 295

Interstate 295 (I-295) in Delaware, New Jersey, and Pennsylvania is an American auxiliary Interstate Highway. It is designated as a bypass around Philadelphia, and a partial beltway of Trenton.

The route begins at the interchange with I-95 south of Wilmington, and runs to an interchange with I-95 in Bristol Township, Pennsylvania. The highway heads east from I-95 and crosses the Delaware River into New Jersey on the Delaware Memorial Bridge, running concurrently with US 40. Upon entering New Jersey, I-295 runs concurrently with the New Jersey Turnpike and US 40 for a brief 0.5 miles (0.80 km) until splitting away at exit 1 and runs parallel to the turnpike for most of its course in the state. After a concurrency with US 130 in Gloucester County, I-295 has an interchange with I-76 and Route 42 in Camden County. The freeway continues northeasterly towards Trenton, where it interchanges with I-195 and Route 29 before bypassing the city to the east, north, and west, crossing the Delaware River on the Scudder Falls Bridge into Pennsylvania. In Pennsylvania, I-295 is signed as an east–west road and heads south to its other terminus at I-95. I-295 is one of two auxiliary Interstates in the US to enter three states, the other being the I-275 beltway around Cincinnati, which enters Ohio, Indiana, and Kentucky.

Three portions of I-295 predate the Interstate Highway System: the Delaware Memorial Bridge and its approach, built in 1951; a section in Salem County, built in 1953; and the part concurrent with US 130, built in two sections that opened in 1948 and 1954. The route was designated on these sections in New Jersey in 1958 and in Delaware in 1959. The portion of I-295 connecting to I-95 in Delaware opened in 1963 while most of the route in New Jersey was finished by the 1980s. The part of I-295 near the interchange with I-195 and Route 29 was finished in 1994. I-295 previously ended in New Jersey at US 1 in Lawrence Township, becoming I-95 heading south into Philadelphia. By July 2018, I-295 was extended along the former I-95 in New Jersey and Bucks County, Pennsylvania, to end at I-95 at the Pennsylvania Turnpike, with no access between I-295 and the latter road. In addition to the extension of I-295, now at 76 miles (122 km), it became the longest signed interstate in New Jersey, surpassing I-80. Improvements continue to be made to the highway, including reconstruction of interchanges and replacement of bridges.

== Route description ==
I-295 begins at I-95, I-495, US 202, and DE 141 near Newport, Delaware, and heads east over the Delaware River on the Delaware Memorial Bridge into New Jersey. The highway intersects the southern terminus of the New Jersey Turnpike and runs northeast through suburban areas of South Jersey parallel to the turnpike, providing a bypass of Philadelphia and Camden. I-295 turns north and bypasses Trenton to the east and turns west at the interchange with US 1 in Lawrence Township. The route heads west around the north side of Trenton, crosses the Delaware River on the Scudder Falls Bridge into Pennsylvania, and heads south to its terminus at I-95 in Bristol Township. The portion of I-295 running through New Jersey is sometimes referred to as the Camden Freeway by the New Jersey Department of Transportation (NJDOT). As part of the Interstate Highway System, the entire length of I-295 is a part of the National Highway System, a network of roads important to the country's economy, defense, and mobility.

=== Newport to Westville ===
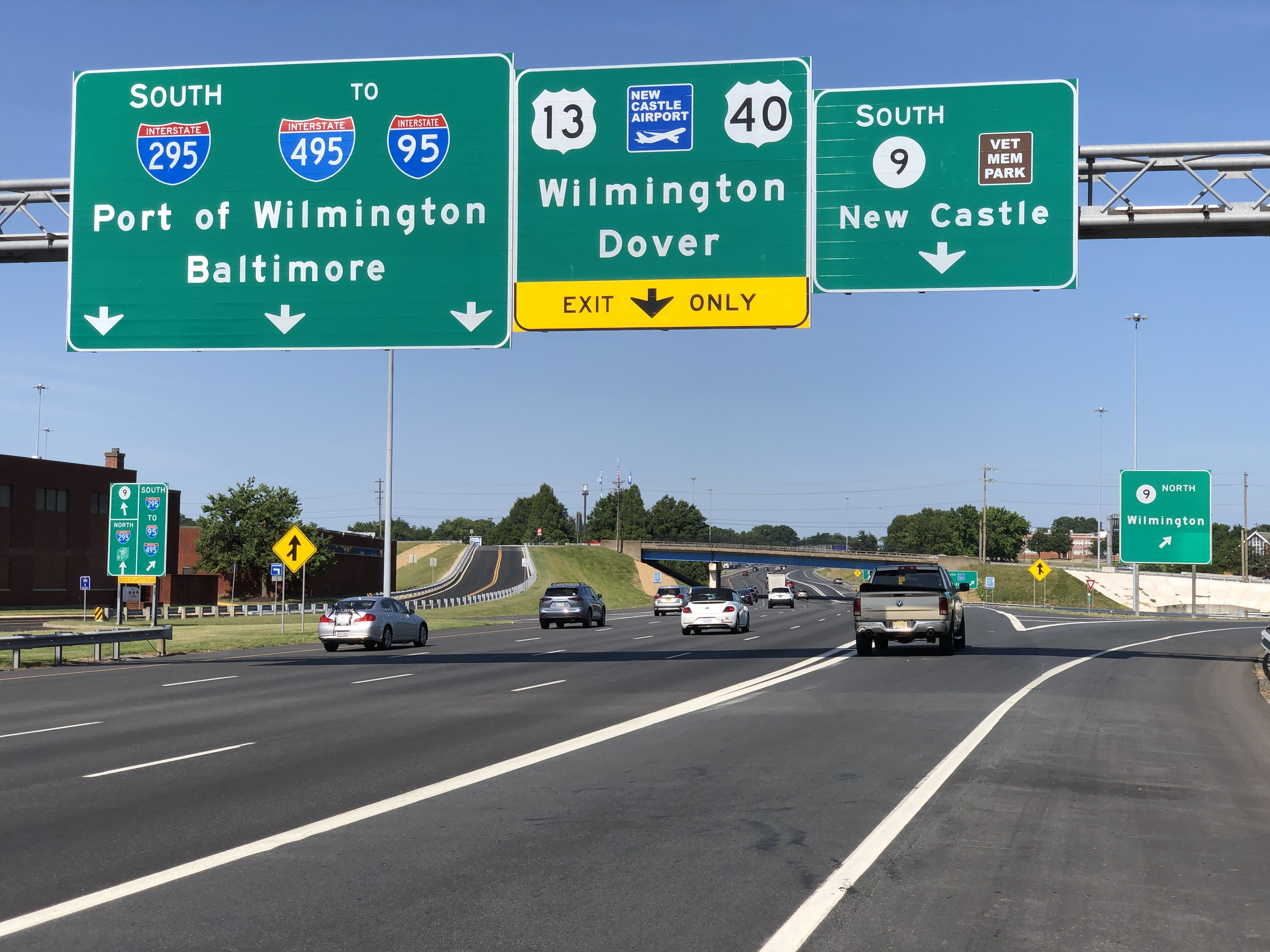
I-295 southbound/US 40 westbound at the DE 9 interchange in Holloway Terrace

I-295 begins at an interchange with I-95, I-495, US 202, and DE 141 south of the town of Newport in New Castle County, Delaware. The northbound beginning of I-295 has direct ramps from both directions of I-95, southbound I-495, and southbound DE 141, while the southbound end of I-295 has direct ramps to both directions of I-95, northbound I-495, and northbound DE 141. From this junction, the highway heads southeast on an eight-lane freeway maintained by the Delaware Department of Transportation that passes to the northeast of suburban neighborhoods in Wilmington Manor. I-295 passes over the Jack A. Markell Trail and reaches an interchange with US 13/US 40 in Farnhurst. Here, US 40 splits from US 13 by heading east concurrently with I-295. At this interchange, the highway becomes maintained by the Delaware River and Bay Authority. The road has an eastbound ramp to Landers Lane before it passes between residential neighborhoods and comes to a cloverleaf interchange with DE 9 north of the city of New Castle. This interchange provides access to Veterans Memorial Park, where a war memorial honoring veterans from Delaware and New Jersey is located. Past DE 9, the median of the freeway widens to include the DRBA headquarters, with direct access to and from the southbound lanes while northbound access is provided by way of DE 9. After this, the southbound lanes of I-295 have a toll plaza for the Delaware Memorial Bridge. I-295/US 40 continues east and passes over Norfolk Southern Railway's New Castle Secondary railroad line before crossing the Delaware River on the twin-span Delaware Memorial Bridge.

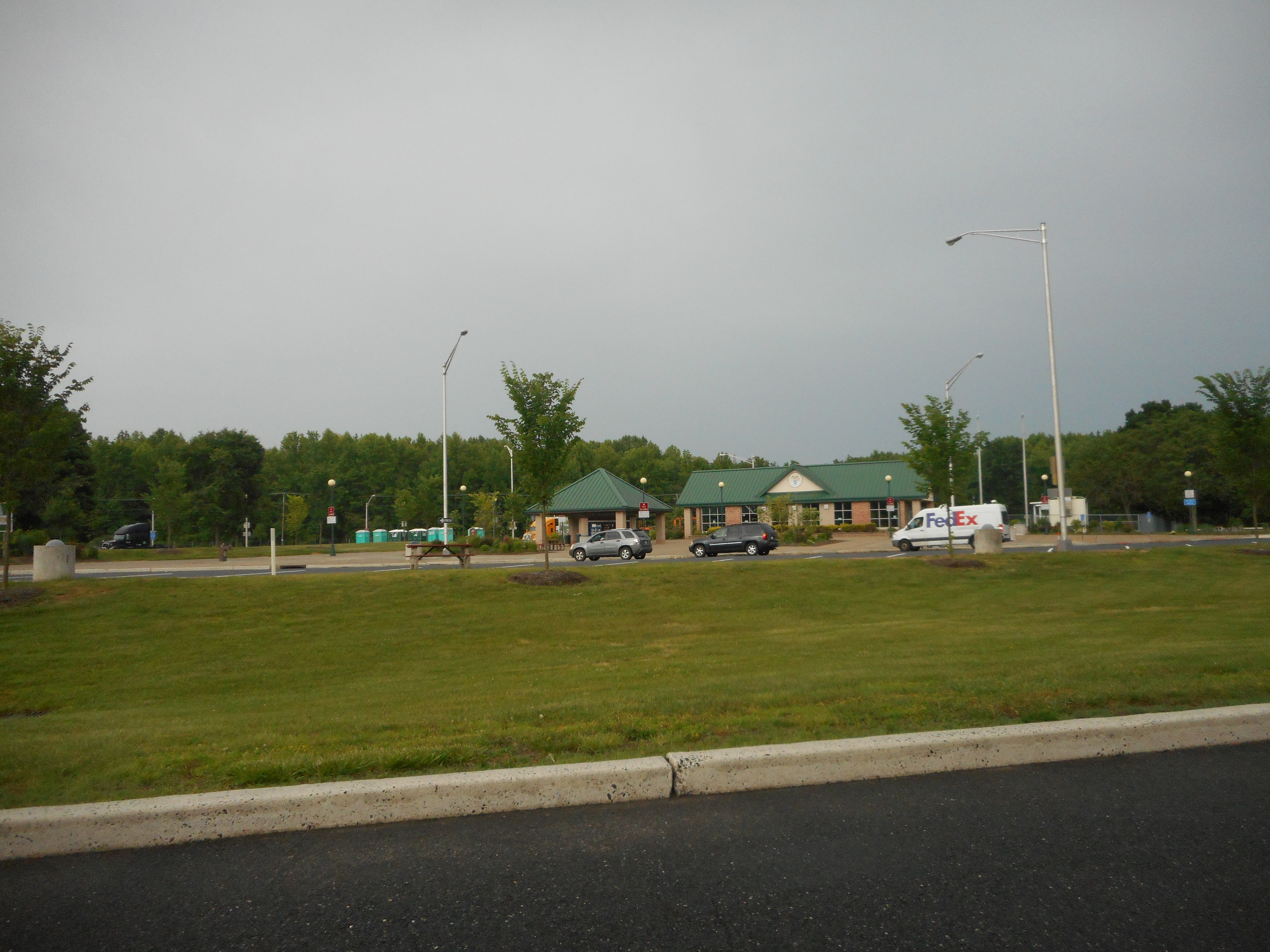
Welcome center/rest area along northbound I-295 in Carneys Point Township

Upon reaching the east bank of the Delaware River, I-295/US 40 begins a brief concurrency with the New Jersey Turnpike and enters Pennsville in Salem County, New Jersey, heading east-southeast through industrial areas. The freeway comes to an interchange with US 130 and Route 49. Here, I-295 splits onto its own freeway maintained by the New Jersey Department of Transportation while US 40 continues along the New Jersey Turnpike for a short distance before it splits to the southeast. A short distance later, the roadway enters Carneys Point and CR 551 merges onto I-295, with the four-lane freeway heading northeast. The highway comes to a junction with Route 140, where CR 551 splits from I-295 by continuing east along Route 140. I-295 heads into wooded areas and features a rest area in the northbound direction. The freeway continues northeast and comes to a northbound weigh station before it reaches the Route 48 exit. The highway runs through a mix of farmland and woodland and enters Oldmans Township, where it comes to an interchange providing access to Straughns Mill Road (CR 643).

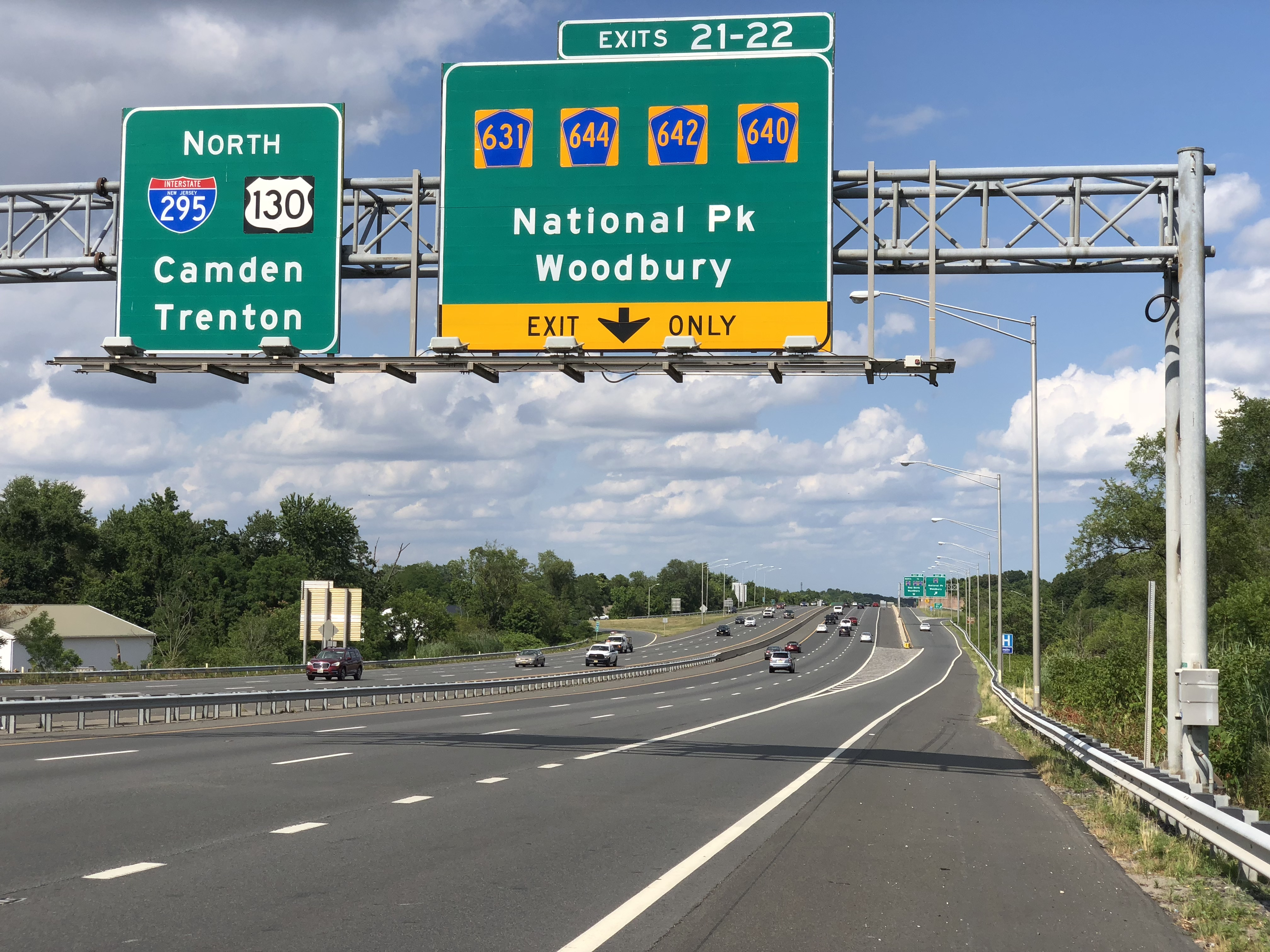
I-295/US 130 northbound at the CR 631/CR 640/CR 642/CR 644 exit in West Deptford Township

I-295 crosses the Oldmans Creek into Logan Township in Gloucester County and passes near some residential development and Pureland Industrial Complex as it comes to the exit for Center Square Road (CR 620). The road crosses the Raccoon Creek and reaches an exit for US 322. Following this, the highway runs through agricultural and wooded areas before northbound US 130 merges into the freeway.

At this point, I-295 and US 130 head east as a six-lane freeway with a narrow median and soon come to the exit for Repaupo Station Road (CR 684). Continuing east, the freeway crosses into Greenwich Township and has an exit for Tomlin Station Road (CR 607). After passing near Greenwich Lake, there are exits for Paulsboro-Swedesboro Road (CR 653) and Democrat Road (CR 673) within a short distance of each other. I-295/US 130 reaches an exit for Harmony Road (CR 680) on the border of Greenwich Township and East Greenwich Township. The road runs through a portion of East Greenwich Township before crossing back into Greenwich Township and coming to an exit for Berkley Road (CR 678) and Cohawkin Road (CR 667) on the border of Greenwich Township and Paulsboro.

Past this point, the freeway runs through marshy areas of Mantua Creek and continues into West Deptford. Here, there is an exit for Mantua Grove Road (CR 656). Passing near more industrial areas, I-295/US 130 has an interchange with Mid-Atlantic Parkway, which provides access to Route 44 as well as to Grove Street (CR 643) and Jessup Road (CR 660). Continuing northeast, the freeway passes over Conrail Shared Assets Operations' Penns Grove Secondary railroad line and reaches an exit for Route 44 and Delaware Street (CR 640). At this point, Route 44 begins to parallel I-295/US 130 on its northwest side as the two roads cross the Woodbury Creek. Route 44 ends at a cul-de-sac that has a ramp from the southbound direction of I-295/US 130 prior to another exit that provides access to Red Bank Avenue (CR 644). The freeway passes near some homes before US 130 splits from I-295 at an interchange that also has access to Hessian Avenue (CR 642). The median of I-295 becomes wider again and it continues east through woods, coming to a southbound exit and northbound entrance with Route 45. The roadway passes over Conrail Shared Assets Operations' Vineland Secondary railroad line and briefly passes through Deptford before it has a partial interchange with CR 551, with a southbound exit and northbound entrance. The highway enters Westville and skirts near residential and commercial development, with another southbound exit and northbound entrance serving Route 47.

=== Bellmawr to Lawrence Township ===
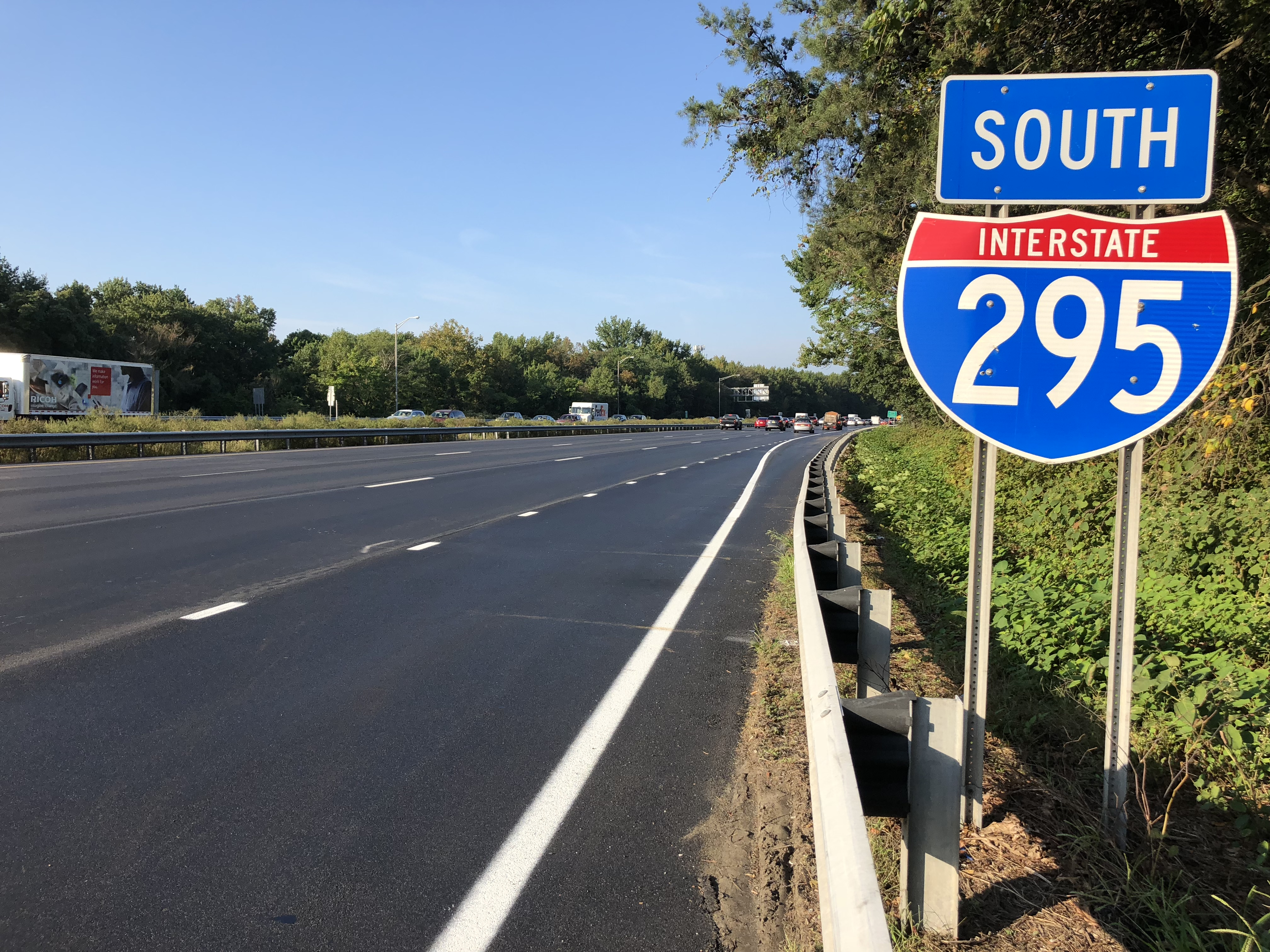
I-295 southbound past the exit for Woodcrest station in Tavistock

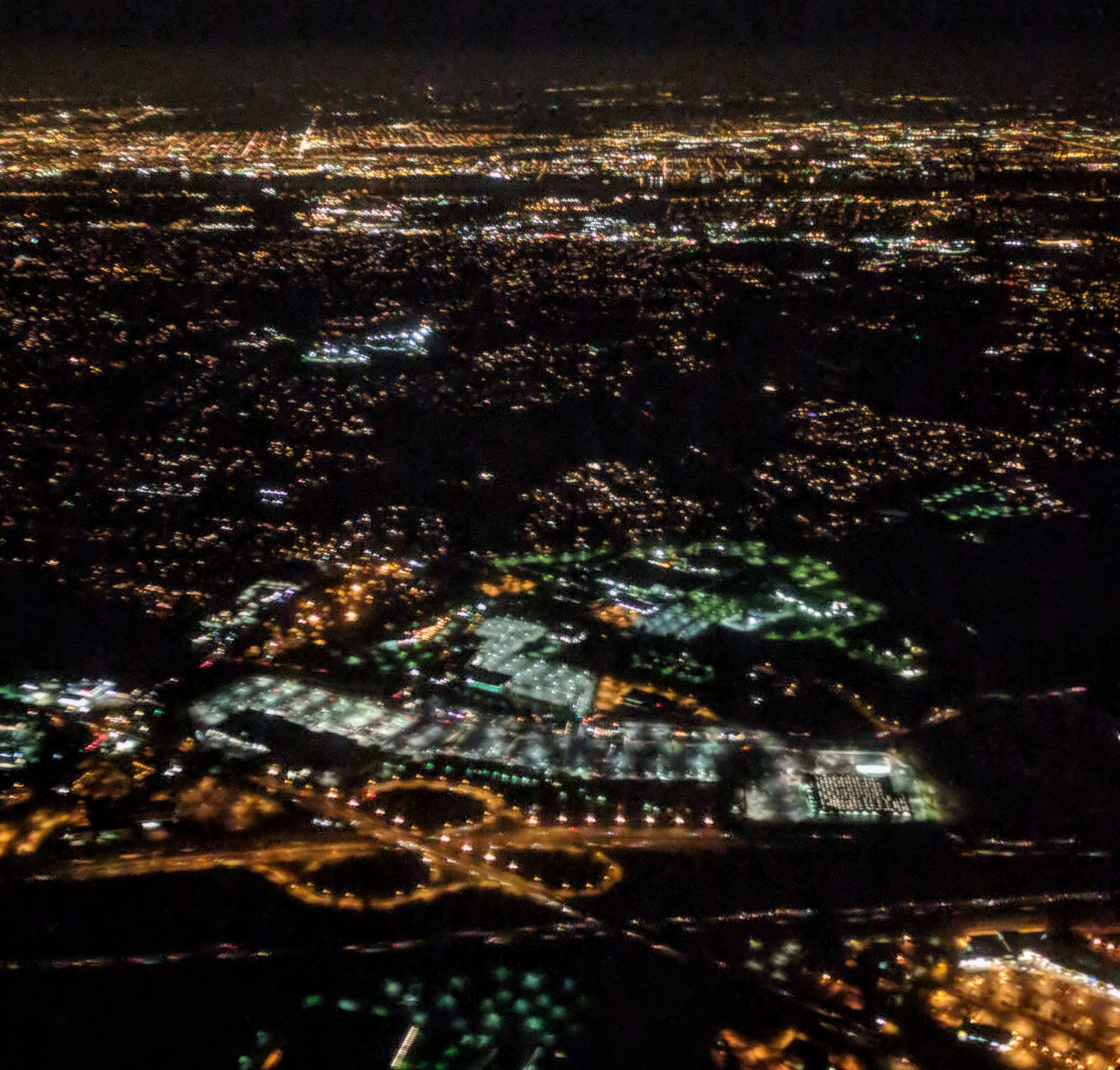
Night aerial view of the three-leaf cloverleaf interchange with Route 38, with the Delaware River and Philadelphia in the background and the New Jersey Turnpike in the foreground.

I-295 crosses the Big Timber Creek into Bellmawr in Camden County and runs northeast, with a northbound exit to southbound Route 42 and a southbound entrance from northbound Route 42, before it comes to the exit for the North–South Freeway, which serves as Route 42 and I-76. At this point, the travel lanes of I-295 head north for a short distance along the outside of the North–South Freeway, with the northbound lanes of I-295 having access from northbound Route 42 and eastbound I-76 and access to westbound I-76 while the southbound lanes of I-295 having access from eastbound I-76 and access to southbound Route 42. Past this, I-295 continues east as a six-lane freeway through wooded areas near suburban development, passing under Conrail Shared Assets Operations' Grenloch Industrial Track line before reaching an exit for Black Horse Pike (Route 168). The highway heads east along the border between Haddon Heights to the north and Barrington to the south and passes over Conrail Shared Assets Operations' Beesleys Point Secondary railroad line before reaching the exit for White Horse Pike (US 30) near its intersection of Clements Bridge Road/Highland Avenue (Route 41/CR 573).

The road fully enters Barrington before crossing into Lawnside, where it comes to a southbound exit and northbound entrance serving Warwick Road (CR 669). After this, I-295 curves northeast and passes through a corner of Tavistock before entering Haddonfield and coming to a trumpet interchange providing access to Woodcrest Station along the PATCO Speedline. At this point, the road becomes closely parallel to the New Jersey Turnpike to the southeast. The highway crosses into Cherry Hill and passes over the tracks carrying the PATCO Speedline and NJ Transit's Atlantic City Line before it reaches the exit for Haddonfield-Berlin Road (CR 561). The roadway runs through wooded areas with suburban neighborhoods to the west and the New Jersey Turnpike to the east as it comes to a cloverleaf interchange at Route 70. Past this, the highway curves north farther west from the turnpike.

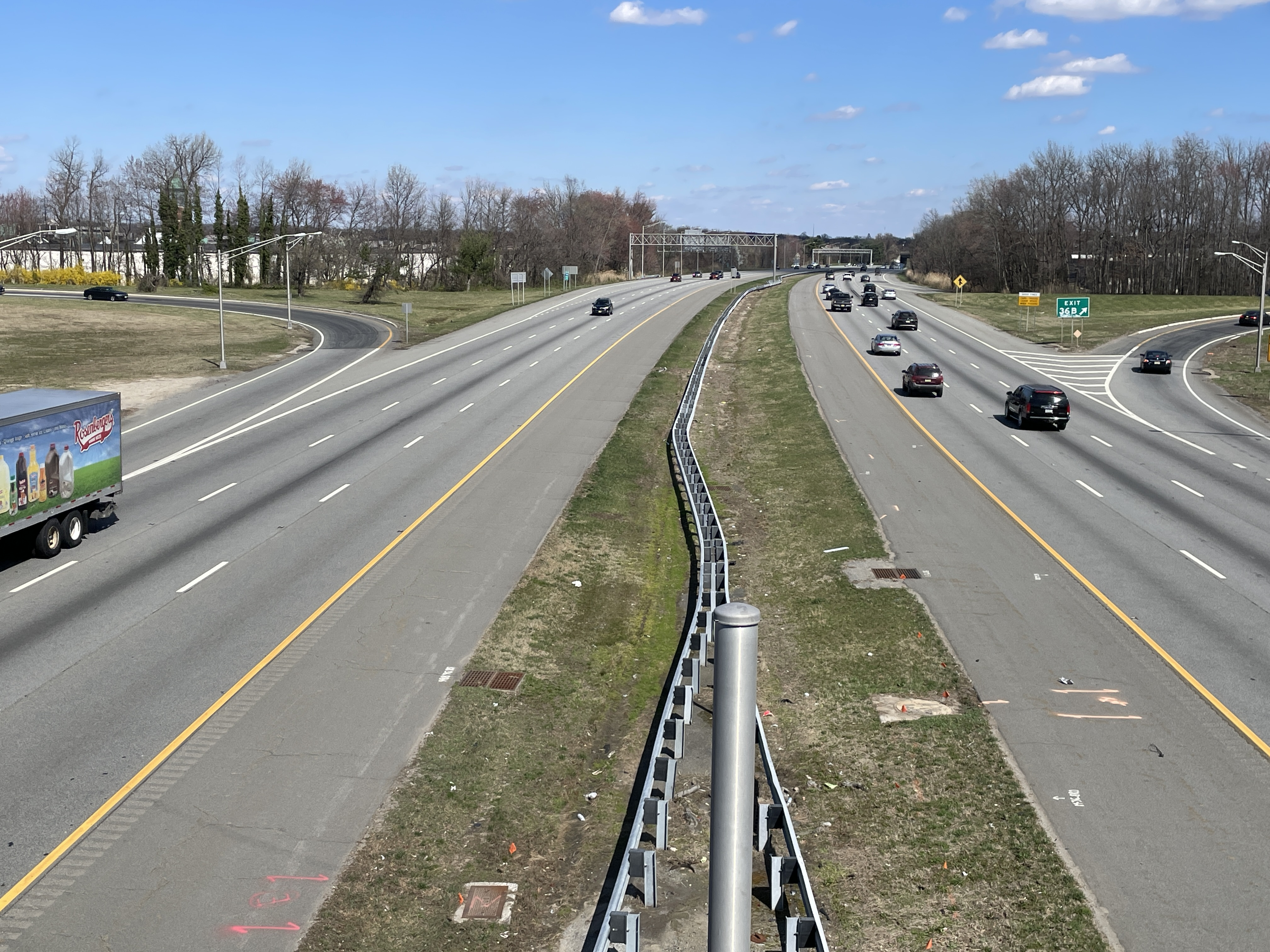
I-295 northbound at the Route 73 interchange in Mount Laurel

I-295 enters Mount Laurel in Burlington County upon crossing Pennsauken Creek and runs northeast through woods near development, reaching a cloverleaf interchange at Route 73 that provides access to the New Jersey Turnpike to the east. Past this, the road passes east-northeast near commercial areas to the southeast of Moorestown Mall before curving northeast to closely follow the turnpike. The highway runs through wooded areas and encounters the exit for Route 38. The roadway passes over Conrail Shared Assets Operations' Pemberton Industrial Track line and Marne Highway (CR 537) and runs through a mix of fields and trees with occasional development, with an exit serving Creek Road (CR 635). I-295 crosses the Rancocas Creek into Westampton and runs through an area of warehouses, where it has a cloverleaf interchange at Rancocas-Mt Holly Road (CR 626). The highway runs north through rural land with nearby buildings and enters Burlington Township. Here, the road curves northeast and comes to a cloverleaf interchange at Burlington-Mt Holly Road (CR 541) that provides access to a commercial area along with the New Jersey Turnpike. The freeway runs through woodland and heads into Springfield Township, where it passes a pair of closed rest areas in each direction. I-295 crosses the Assiscunk Creek into Florence and heads through a mix of farm fields and trees before it enters Mansfield Township and comes to a cloverleaf interchange at Florence-Columbus Road (CR 656) that provides access to nearby Columbus Road (CR 543). The highway passes over the Pearl Harbor Memorial Extension of the New Jersey Turnpike (I-95) and continues through rural land into Bordentown Township, where a northbound exit and southbound entrance serves Rising Sun Road that provides access to US 206 and the New Jersey Turnpike (I-95). Past this, the road curves north and reaches the exit for US 130 west of Bordentown before passing through woodland and crossing over NJ Transit's River Line.

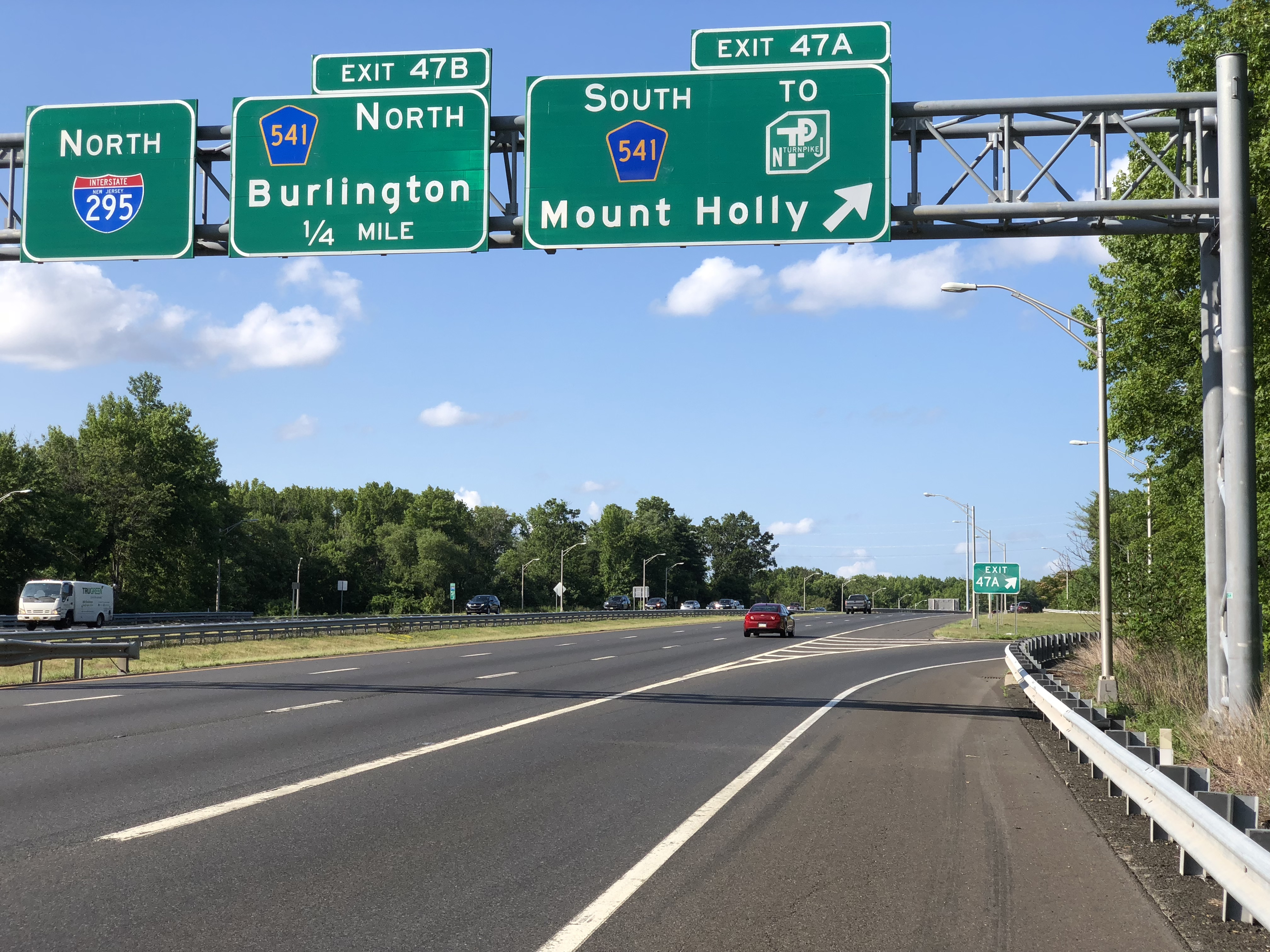
I-295 northbound at the CR 541 exit in Burlington Township

I-295 crosses the Crosswicks Creek into Hamilton in Mercer County and runs through woods and marshland a short distance east of the Delaware River. A scenic overlook of the river is located along the southbound side of the road; access from the northbound lanes is provided by a pedestrian bridge over the highway. The freeway heads farther from the river and passes over the River Line again before it reaches a modified cloverleaf interchange serving I-195 to Belmar and Route 29 to Trenton. Following this junction, the road heads northeast near residential neighborhoods and comes to an exit for Arena Drive (CR 620) that provides access to nearby White Horse Avenue (CR 533). A short distance later, a southbound exit and northbound entrance provides access to northbound Olden Avenue (CR 622). I-295 continues through wooded areas with nearby development and curves north to come to an exit for Route 33 and Hamilton Avenue (CR 606). The next interchange is a southbound exit and northbound entrance at East State Street (CR 535). The highway continues through woods and reaches a cloverleaf interchange serving Sloan Avenue (CR 649). The roadway comes to a bridge over Amtrak's Northeast Corridor railroad line and crosses into Lawrence Township, where it curves northwest and comes to a modified cloverleaf interchange with US 1.

=== Lawrence Township to Bristol Township ===
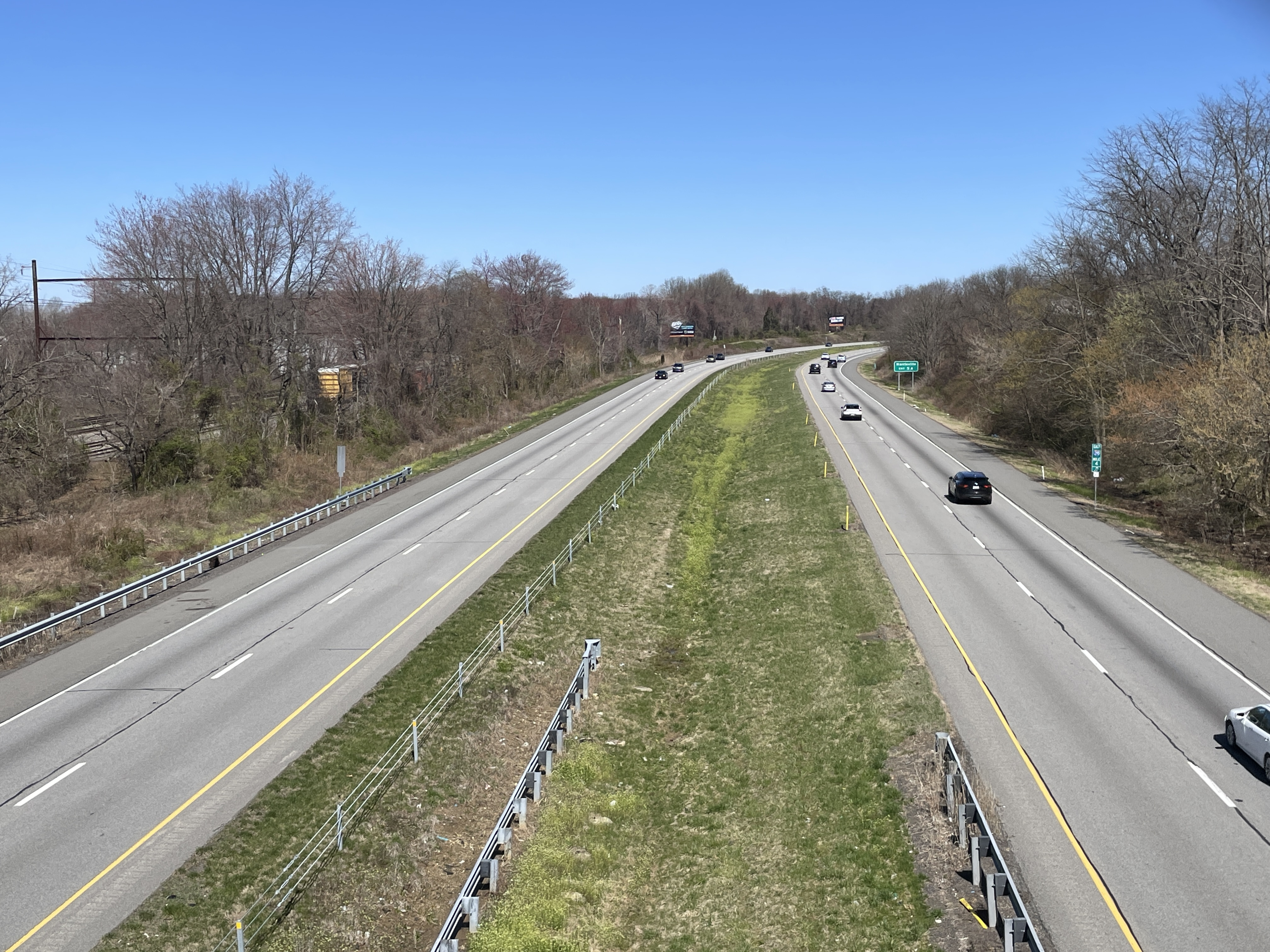
I-295 eastbound in Middletown Township

West of US 1, the freeway passes commercial areas. I-295 comes to a partial cloverleaf interchange at Princeton Pike (CR 583), before coming to a southbound ramp to Franklin Corner Road (CR 546). Continuing west, the road reaches a cloverleaf interchange with US 206. I-295 has a northbound exit and southbound entrance serving Federal City Road, before leaving Lawrence Township and entering Hopewell Township. The median of the freeway widens as it runs near suburban residential areas; this is where the Somerset Freeway would have begun, had it been built. Upon entering Hopewell Township, the median narrows.

I-295 turns southwest past suburban development containing some farmland. It reaches the interchange with Route 31 and passes through Ewing before returning to Hopewell Township, crossing under CSX Transportation's Trenton Subdivision railroad line. The next interchange along the route provides access to Scotch Road (CR 611) and Trenton–Mercer Airport via a cloverleaf interchange. After Scotch Road (CR 611), the highway crosses back into Ewing Township and passes to the northwest of the airport. An interchange with Bear Tavern Road (CR 579) also serves Trenton–Mercer Airport. The freeway comes to the exit for Route 29 that also has a northbound entrance from Route 175. At this point, maintenance of the road changes from the New Jersey Department of Transportation to the Delaware River Joint Toll Bridge Commission, and I-295 widens from six to eight lanes. Immediately after the exit for Route 29, I-295 then crosses the Delaware River into Pennsylvania on the tolled Scudder Falls Bridge. At the state line, I-295 transitions from a north–south road to an east–west road, with the northbound direction turning into the westbound direction upon crossing into Pennsylvania and the eastbound direction turning into the southbound direction upon crossing into New Jersey.

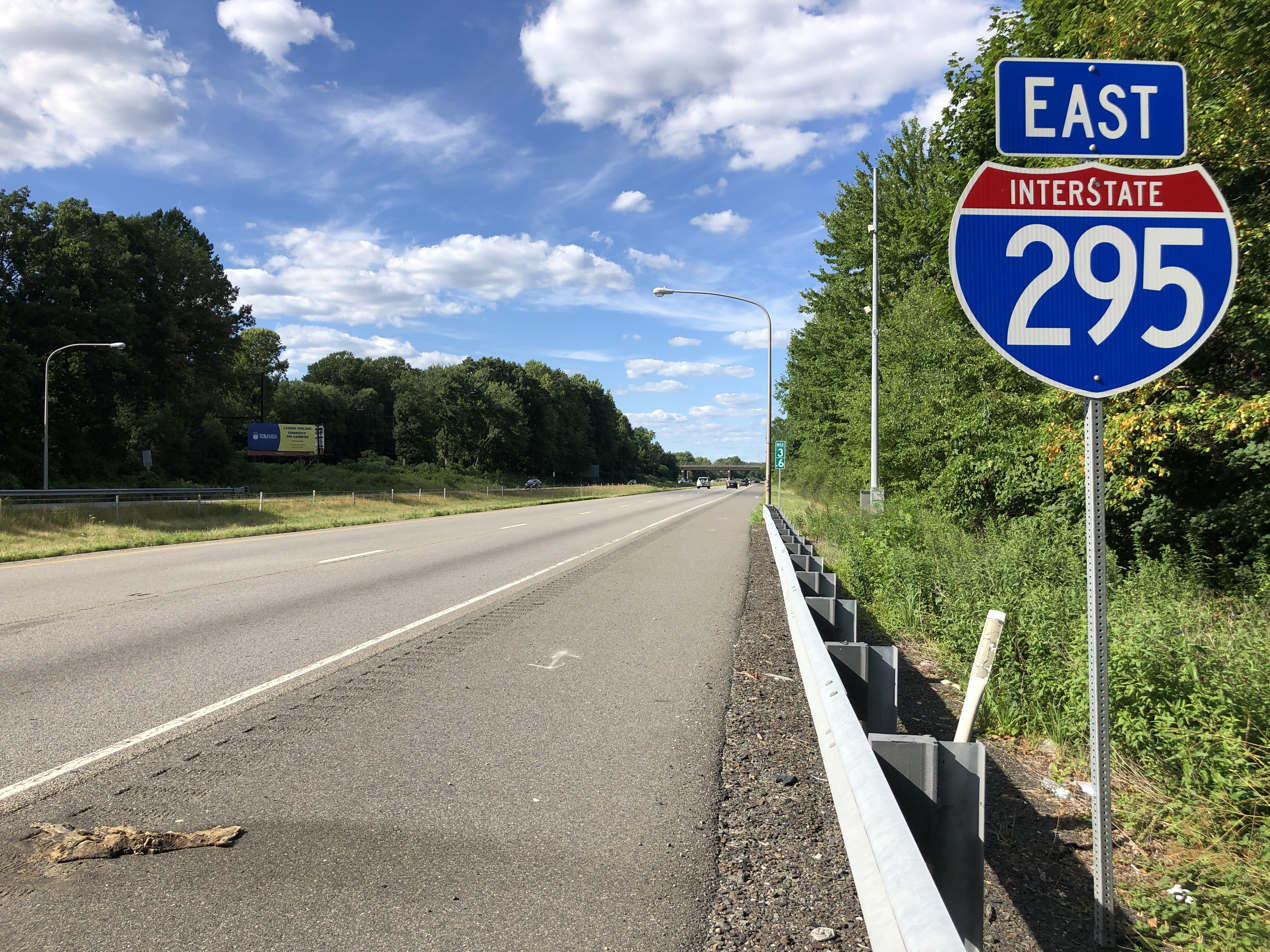
I-295 eastbound past the US 1 Bus./PA 413 interchange in Middletown Township

Upon crossing the Delaware River, I-295 becomes the Delaware Expressway and enters Lower Makefield Township in Bucks County, passing over PA 32 and reaching an electronic toll gantry in the westbound direction. After crossing the Delaware Canal, I-295 reaches an exit for Taylorsville Road, which provides indirect access to PA 32, to the north of Yardley, and narrows to six lanes. Here, the Pennsylvania Department of Transportation takes over maintenance of the road. At this interchange, the route changes cardinal directions, with northbound becoming westbound and eastbound becoming southbound. I-295 continues west-southwest near suburban residential areas and features a westbound rest area and weigh station. The freeway turns to the south and reaches the exit for PA 332 that serves Newtown to the west, narrowing again to four lanes. I-295 continues south near some farmland before passing near more homes with some commercial development. The freeway comes to a bridge over SEPTA's West Trenton Line and CSX Transportation's Trenton Subdivision before it crosses into Middletown Township and comes to a cloverleaf interchange with US 1. Immediately after this interchange, I-295 passes over Norfolk Southern Railway's Morrisville Line and CSX Transportation's Fairless Branch as it curves southwest, heading northwest of commercial development and the Oxford Valley Mall. The freeway makes a curve to the south and becomes parallel to SEPTA's West Trenton Line and CSX Transportation's Trenton Subdivision to the west, passing under PA 213 without an interchange. The railroad tracks split to the west and I-295 reaches a diamond interchange with Bus. US 1/PA 413 to the east of Penndel. Following this interchange, the freeway crosses the Mill Creek and runs south-southeast near suburban residential areas as it heads west of Levittown. I-295 enters Bristol Township and terminates at an interchange with I-95 at the Pennsylvania Turnpike (I-276). At this interchange, I-295 merges into southbound I-95, with access from westbound I-295 to southbound I-95 and from northbound I-95 to eastbound I-295; there are no ramps connecting I-295 and the Pennsylvania Turnpike.

== History ==
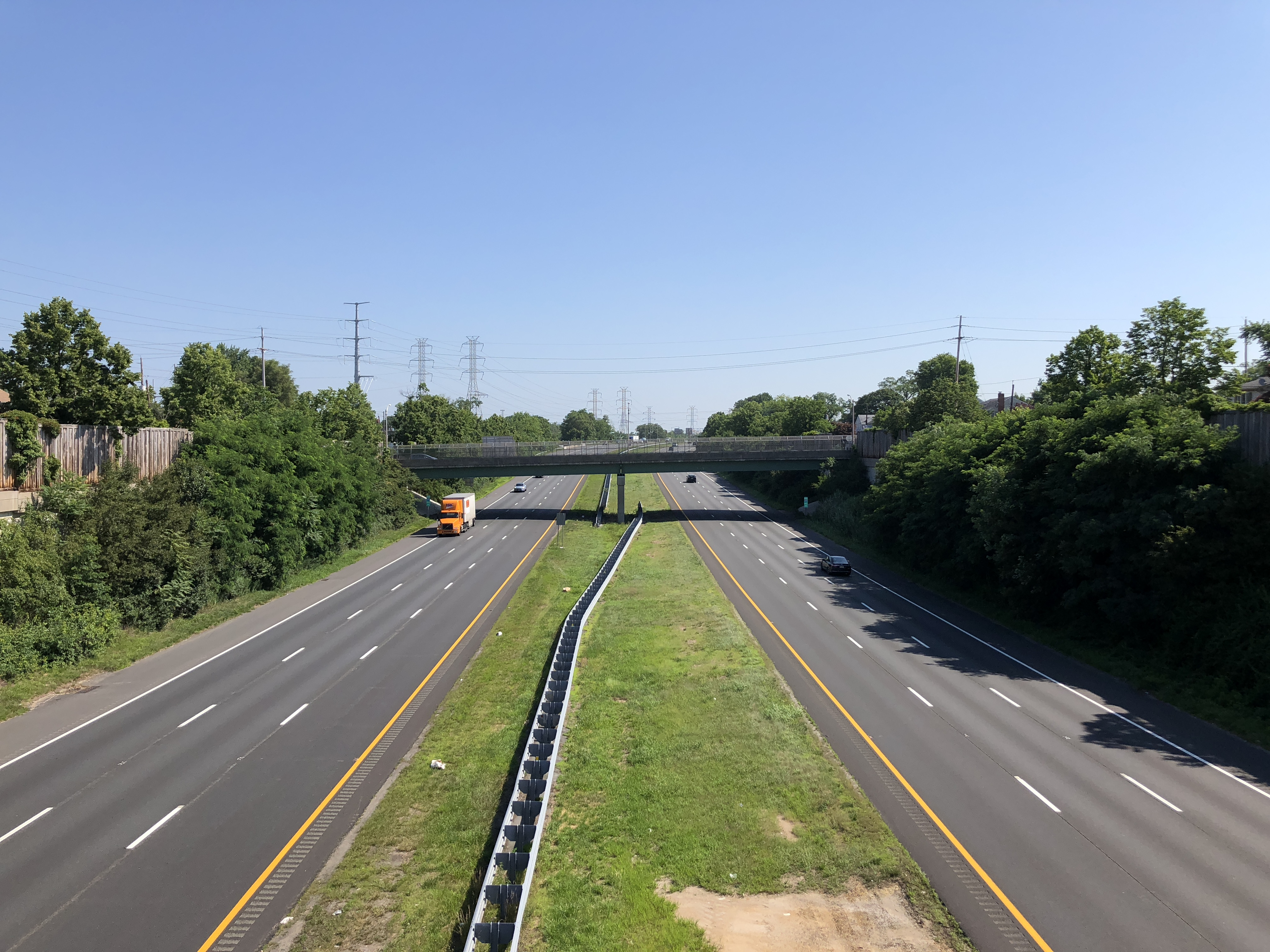
View north along I-295 from US 206 (South Broad Street) in Hamilton Township

In the 1927 New Jersey state highway renumbering, Route 39 was legislated to begin at the Yardley–Wilburtha Bridge and bypass Trenton to the north and east before continuing south to Hammonton along present-day US 206. Route 39, which was not built around Trenton, was decommissioned in the 1953 New Jersey state highway renumbering.

=== Original construction ===
Portions of I-295 in Salem and Gloucester counties predate the Interstate Highway System as part of freeway bypasses for the surface section of US 130/Route 44 through Carneys Point and between Bridgeport and Westville. In 1948, the first section of the US 130/Route 44 bypass in Gloucester County between current exits 21 and 24 opened, with a second section between exits 14 and 21 opening in 1954. The section of the present highway between the New Jersey Turnpike and the present-day CR 618 bridge was built as part of the US 130 bypass of Carneys Point in 1953. The concurrent Route 44 designation was removed from US 130 in the 1953 New Jersey state highway renumbering and was later assigned to the former surface alignment of US 130 through Carneys Point and between Bridgeport and Westville. In 1958, the US 130 bypass of Carneys Point and the freeway in Gloucester County was designated as part of I-295.

Construction on the Delaware Memorial Bridge began in 1949. At the same time, work was underway on the Delaware Memorial Bridge approach in Delaware, a divided highway which would begin at a directional T interchange with US 13/US 202 in Farnhurst and head east to a cloverleaf interchange at New Castle Avenue (present DE 9) before leading to the bridge. Construction on the US 13/US 202 interchange at Farnhurst began on July 12, 1950. On August 16, 1951, the Delaware Memorial Bridge opened to traffic. The Delaware Memorial Bridge and the approach road to US 13/US 202 became a part of US 40 following the opening of the bridge. I-295 was designated onto the New Jersey approach of the bridge in 1958. That same year, construction began for a bridge at the Farnhurst interchange that would link the US 40 approach to the Delaware Memorial Bridge to the Delaware Turnpike that was proposed to run west to the Maryland state line. A year later, the Farnhurst interchange and the bridge approach were upgraded to Interstate Highway standards, and it was designated as part of I-295. Construction at the interchange connecting to the Delaware Turnpike at Farnhurst was completed in July 1961. On November 14, 1963, the Delaware Turnpike opened to traffic, with I-295 extended west (south) to I-95 at the northern terminus of the Delaware Turnpike, which continued south as I-95. In the middle of 1964, work began on a second span at the Delaware Memorial Bridge due to increasing traffic volumes. The second span of the bridge was opened to traffic in late 1968.

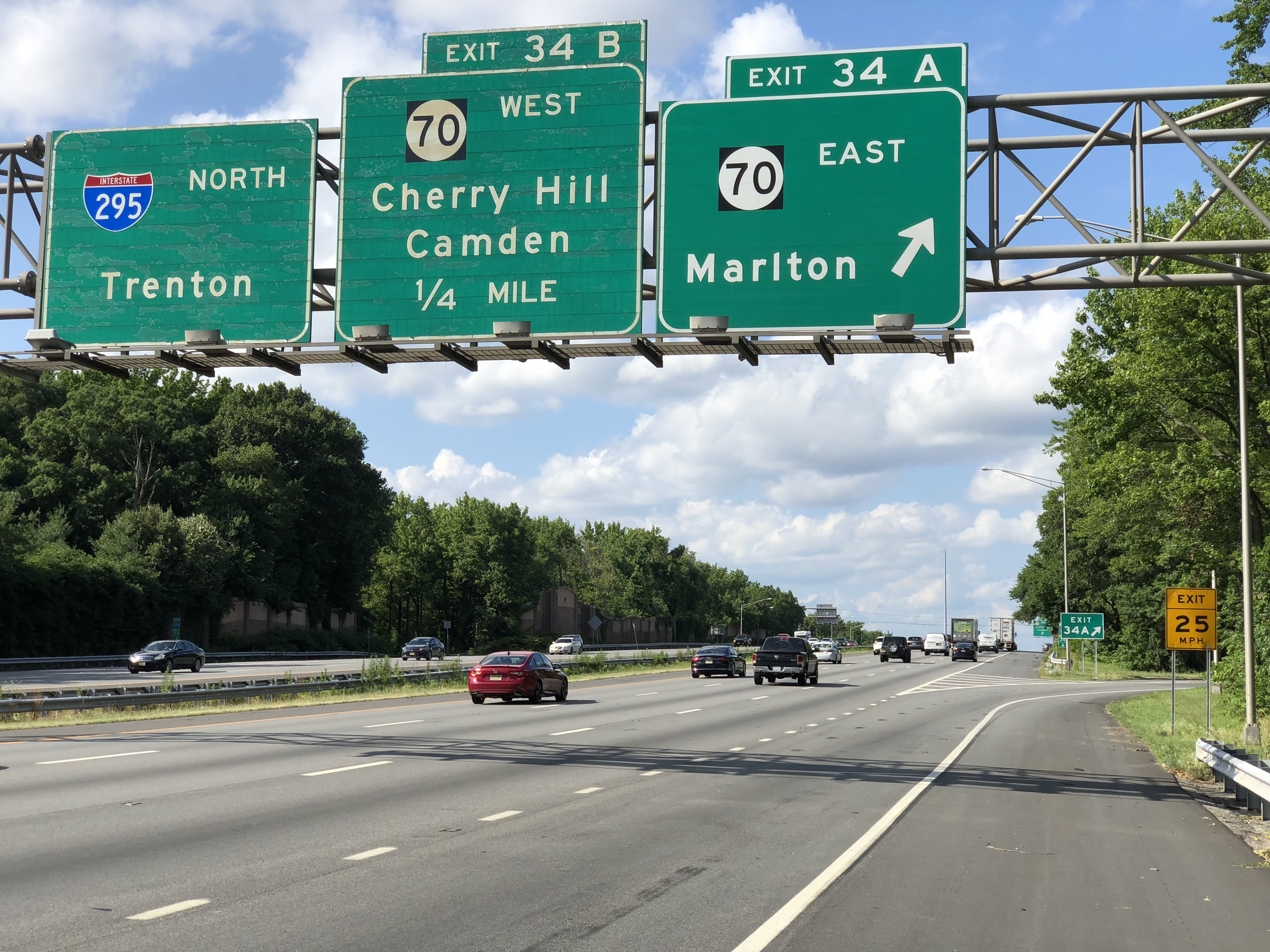
I-295 northbound at the Route 70 interchange in Cherry Hill

The remainder of I-295 through New Jersey was planned as Federal Aid Interstate Route 108, which was created by the New Jersey Department of Transportation in 1956. I-295 was built between Big Timber Creek and Route 42 in 1958. In 1960, the section of the Interstate between Route 42 and Warwick Road was finished. The highway was built between US 130 and Route 45 in 1960 and was extended east to the Big Timber Creek a year later. In 1963, I-295 was completed between Warwick Road and just south of Route 70. A year later, the roadway was extended north to Route 73. The freeway was built between Route 73 and Route 38 in 1966. In 1968, the section of I-295 between Carneys Point and Bridgeport was finished. Following the completion of this section, US 130 reverted to its previous surface alignment through Carneys Point, replacing that portion of Route 44. In 1972, the highway was finished between Route 38 and CR 541. I-295 was extended from CR 541 northward to US 130 near Bordentown a year later. I-295 was completed from US 1 west to a proposed interchange with I-95 in Hopewell Township in 1974. In 1975, the roadway was constructed from south of the Route 33 interchange north to US 1. The section of I-295 between Arena Drive and south of Route 33 was finished in 1984. In 1987, I-295 was built between I-195/Route 29 and Arena Drive, with the highway between I-195/Route 29 and Route 33 opened to traffic on August 16 of that year. The final section of I-295 between US 130 in Bordentown and I-195/Route 29 was finished in 1994.

=== Since completion ===
At its original northern terminus, the freeway continued west as I-95 toward the Scudder Falls Bridge while I-95 was proposed to head north along the Somerset Freeway. In 1983, the Somerset Freeway portion of I-95 was canceled as a result of community opposition. In the 1990s, the northern terminus of I-295 was moved to the exit for US 1 in Lawrence Township, with the route west of there replaced by an extended I-95. Due to the cancellation of the Somerset Freeway, a gap existed along I-95 in New Jersey. To bridge the gap, motorists from northbound I-95 were directed to follow I-295 southbound and I-195 eastbound to reach the New Jersey Turnpike at exit 7A to continue north along I-95, and vice versa.

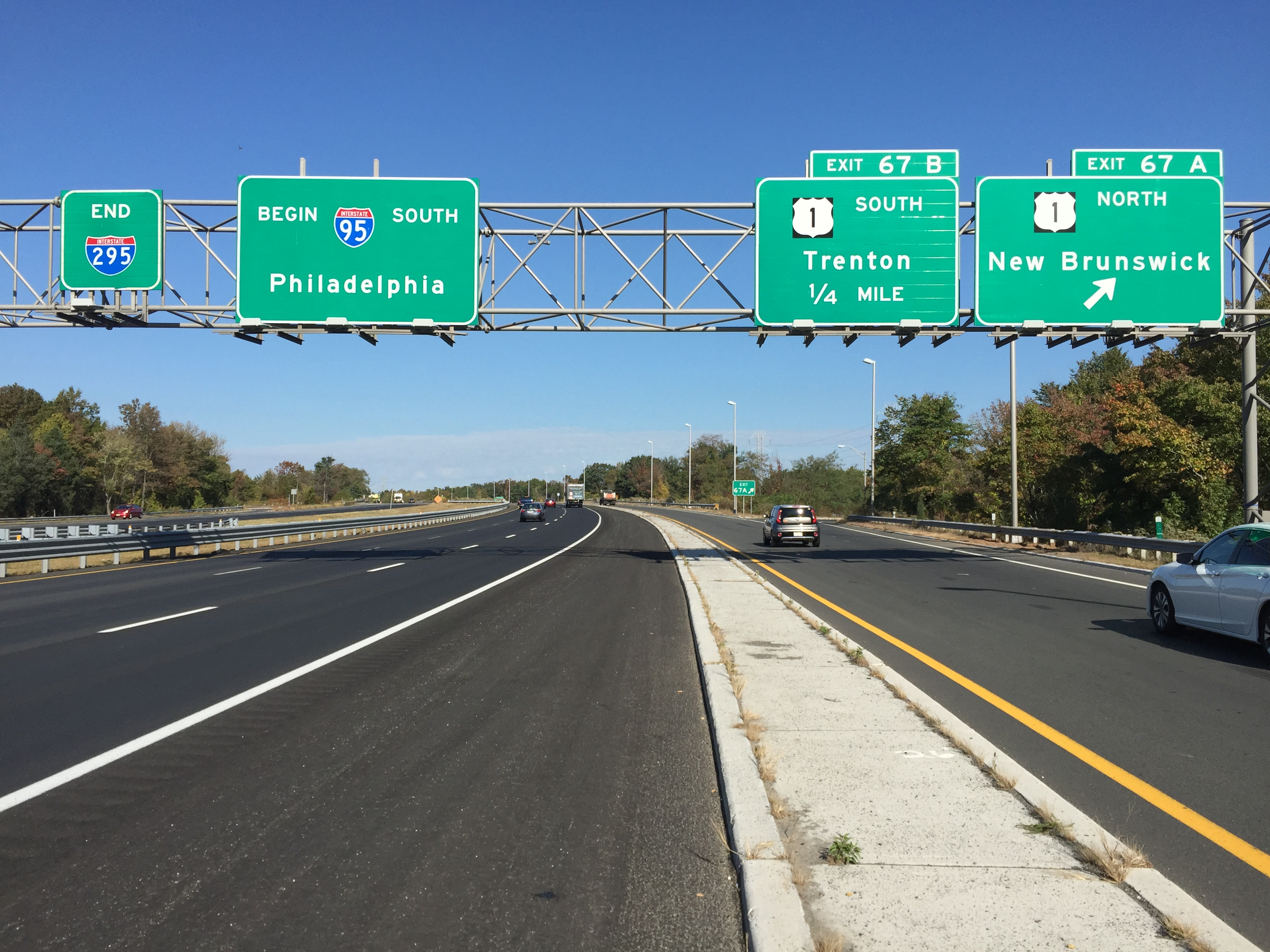
The former northern terminus of I-295 at US 1 and I-95 in Lawrence in 2017 (signs in picture have been updated)

In 1995, the southbound rest area along I-295 in Burlington County was named for radio personality Howard Stern. Governor Christine Todd Whitman named the rest area after Stern as payback for his granting Whitman airtime during her 1993 gubernatorial campaign. A plaque proclaiming the rest area as the "Howard Stern Rest Stop" was installed, with an image of Stern poking his head from an outhouse. Days after the plaque was installed, it was stolen and later mailed to Stern. In 2003, the rest areas along I-295 in Burlington County were closed as part of funding cuts in Governor Jim McGreevey's budget, saving the state $1 million a year.

In 2004, reconstruction was completed on the portion between exits 32 and 40. Sound walls were also installed along the rest of the road.

I-295, like many other highways in New Jersey, once had solar-powered emergency callboxes every mile (1.6 km); the use of the callboxes became limited due to the increasing popularity of cellphones. To save on maintenance costs, the New Jersey Department of Transportation removed these callboxes in 2005.

An improvement of exit 19 was completed in 2009.

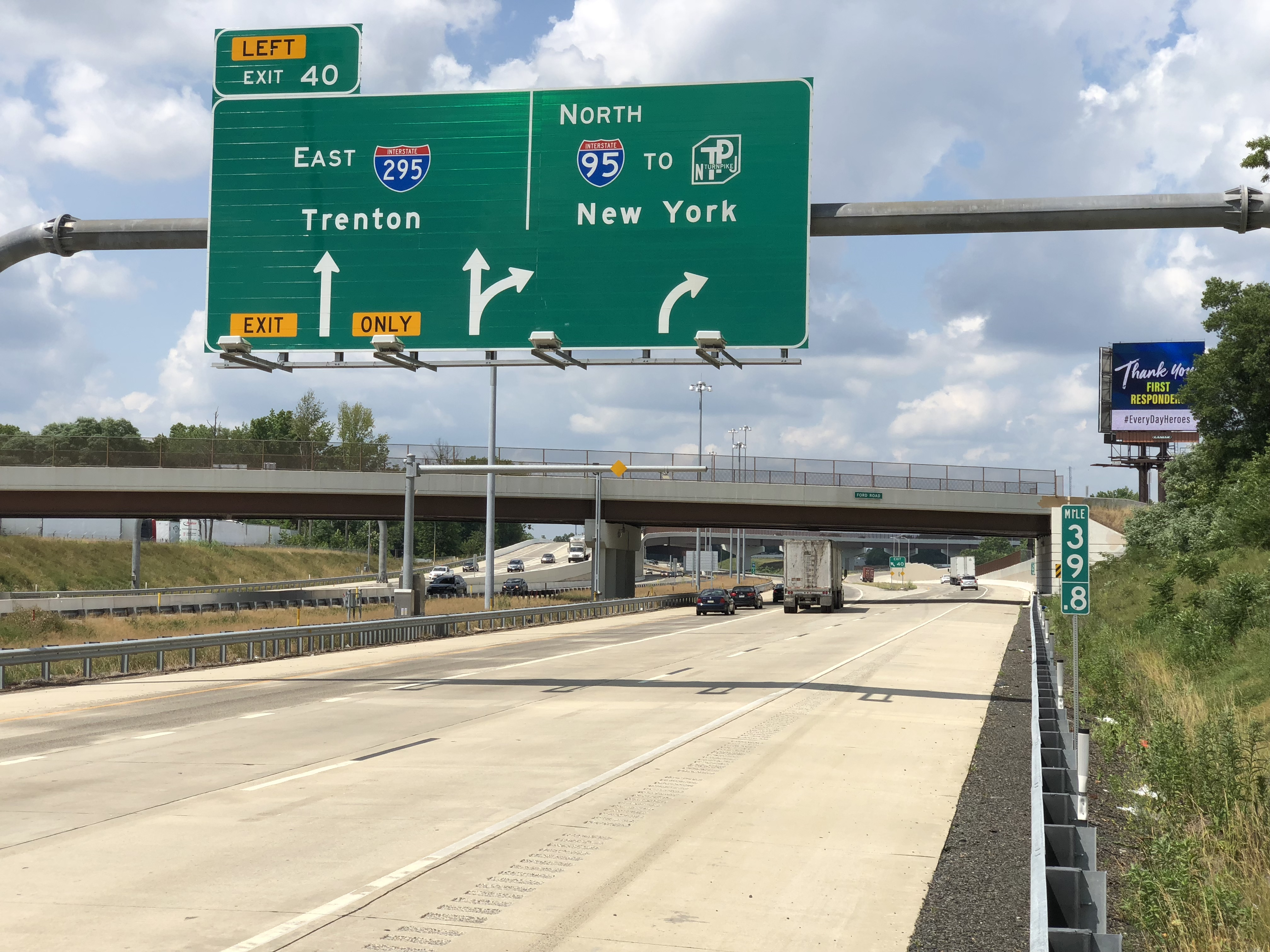
The beginning of I-295 eastbound from I-95 northbound in Bristol Township

In preparation for the completion of the first stage of the interchange between I-95 and the Pennsylvania Turnpike in Bristol Township, the former route was truncated from New Jersey to the site of the interchange. In its place, I-295 was extended, ending at the unfinished interchange. The New Jersey Department of Transportation and the Delaware River Joint Toll Bridge Commission completed Phases 1 and 2 of the redesignation in March 2018, extending the route from US 1 in Lawrence Township across the Scudder Falls Bridge to Taylorsville Road in Pennsylvania. The Pennsylvania Department of Transportation finished Phase 3 in July of the same year, signing their section as east–west despite its north–south alignment to avoid a change in direction from north to south on the same route. Between September 2005 and May 2015, New Jersey and Pennsylvania intended to extend I-195 around Trenton instead of I-295. This would have also truncated I-295 to its interchange with I-195 and Route 29. However, in 2015, plans changed once again to extend I-295. This was because of guidelines set by the American Association of State Highway and Transportation Officials, which state that auxiliary Interstates with an odd-numbered first digit should only connect with their parent route once. Since the extended route would have two junctions with the parent route (I-95), a route number with an even-numbered first digit was considered more appropriate.

On September 22, 2018, the first stage of the interchange opened, allowing for I-95 to be routed onto the Pennsylvania Turnpike to connect to the New Jersey Turnpike, truncating the eastern terminus of I-276 to the new interchange and completing I-95 from Miami to the Canadian border. However, there remains no access between I-295 and the Pennsylvania Turnpike (I-276), nor between I-295 westbound and I-95 northbound and vice versa. The next stage of the project will complete the movements at the interchange.

In early 2015, the Delaware River and Bay Authority began a project to reconstruct southbound I-295 between US 13/US 40 and I-95/I-495. The first phase, which took place between early 2015 and late 2016, reconstructed and repaved the left lanes of southbound I-295, reconstructed and repaved the right side of the ramps to US 13/US 40, I-495, and northbound I-95, and closed the ramp from northbound US 13 to southbound I-295 and built a new loop ramp. The second phase, which took place between 2016 and 2017, reconstructed and repaved the right lanes of southbound I-295, completed construction on the ramps from southbound I-295, and built a tunnel carrying the Jack A. Markell Trail under I-295. The final phase, which took place between 2017 and 2018, reconstructed the ramp from southbound US 13 to southbound I-295, removed the former ramp from northbound US 13 to southbound I-295, and reconstructed the left lane and shoulder on the ramps from southbound I-295 to I-95.

The structurally deficient Scudder Falls Bridge, which carried I-295 over the Delaware River between Lower Makefield Township, Pennsylvania, and Ewing, New Jersey, needed to be replaced. Construction on a dual-span replacement bridge began in April 2017. The first span opened to Pennsylvania-bound traffic on July 10, 2019, and opened to New Jersey-bound traffic on July 24. Demolition of the original span commenced right after and construction of the second new span began afterwards, which opened in August 2021. The new bridge has six through-traffic lanes (three in each direction), acceleration and deceleration lanes, shoulders, and a shared bicycle and pedestrian path. Additionally, the two adjoining interchanges with Route 29 and Taylorsville Road were reconstructed. Previously a toll-free crossing, on July 14, 2019, an electronic toll was instituted for Pennsylvania-bound traffic, payable using E-ZPass or toll by plate.

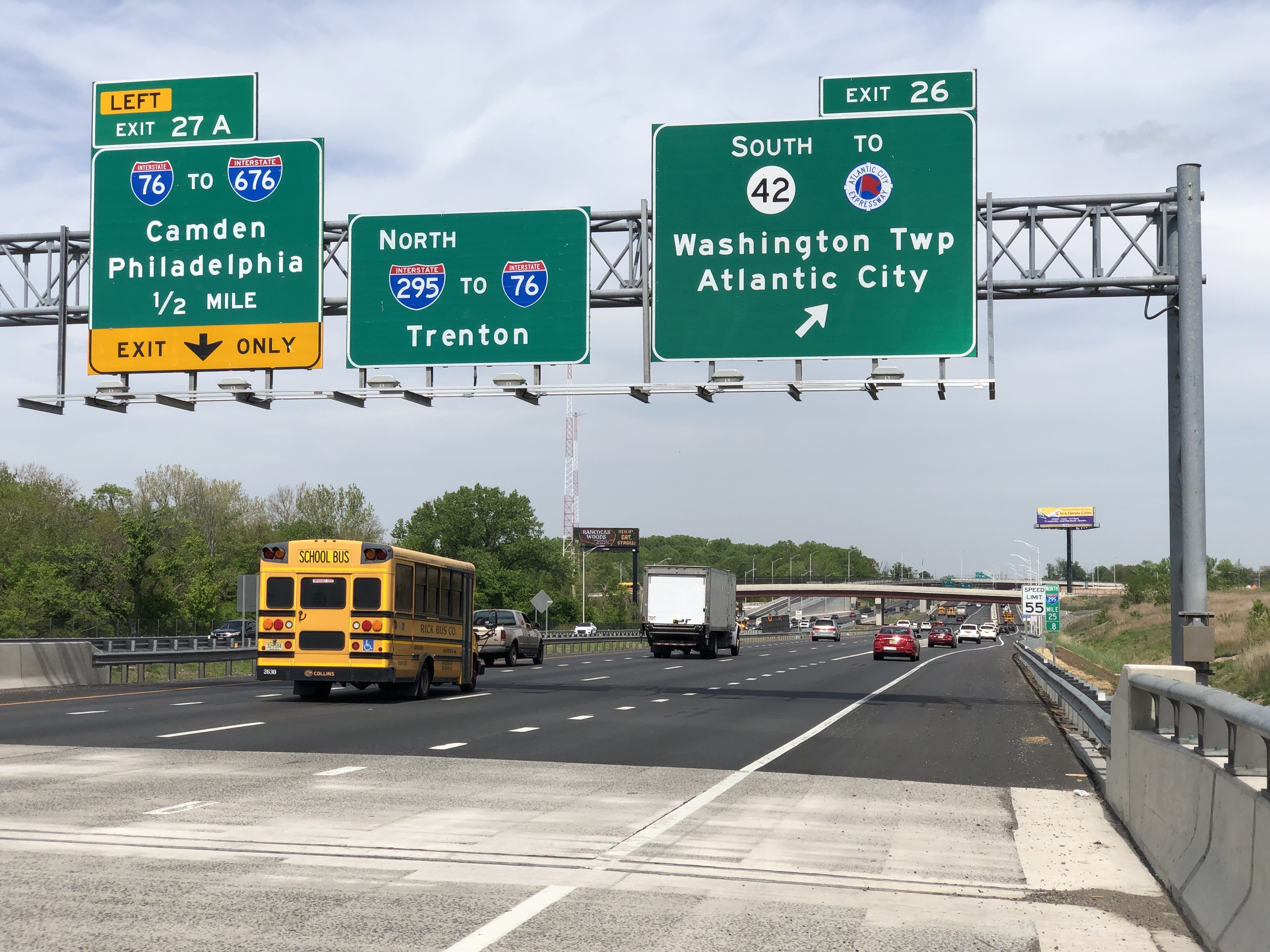
The ramp from Interstate 295 northbound to Route 42 southbound opened in November 2023

The New Jersey Department of Transportation had also announced another project to address the missing connections between I-295 and Route 42 to provide an easier connection between the Philadelphia metropolitan area and points south to Atlantic City and vice versa. This project, dubbed the I-295/Route 42 Missing Moves, would provide connections from I-295 northbound to Route 42 southbound and Route 42 northbound to I-295 southbound by constructing two ramps just south of the I-295/I-76/Route 42 interchange. Construction began in March 2020, and the ramps opened to traffic on November 28, 2023.

On August 5, 2024, construction will begin to build an additional northbound lane for I-295 between the I-95 and US 13/US 40 interchanges. This project will provide a third lane for I-295 at the exit from I-95. This lane is being built to reduce traffic congestion along this stretch of road, which often backs up onto I-95. Construction is planned to be completed in the latter part of 2025.

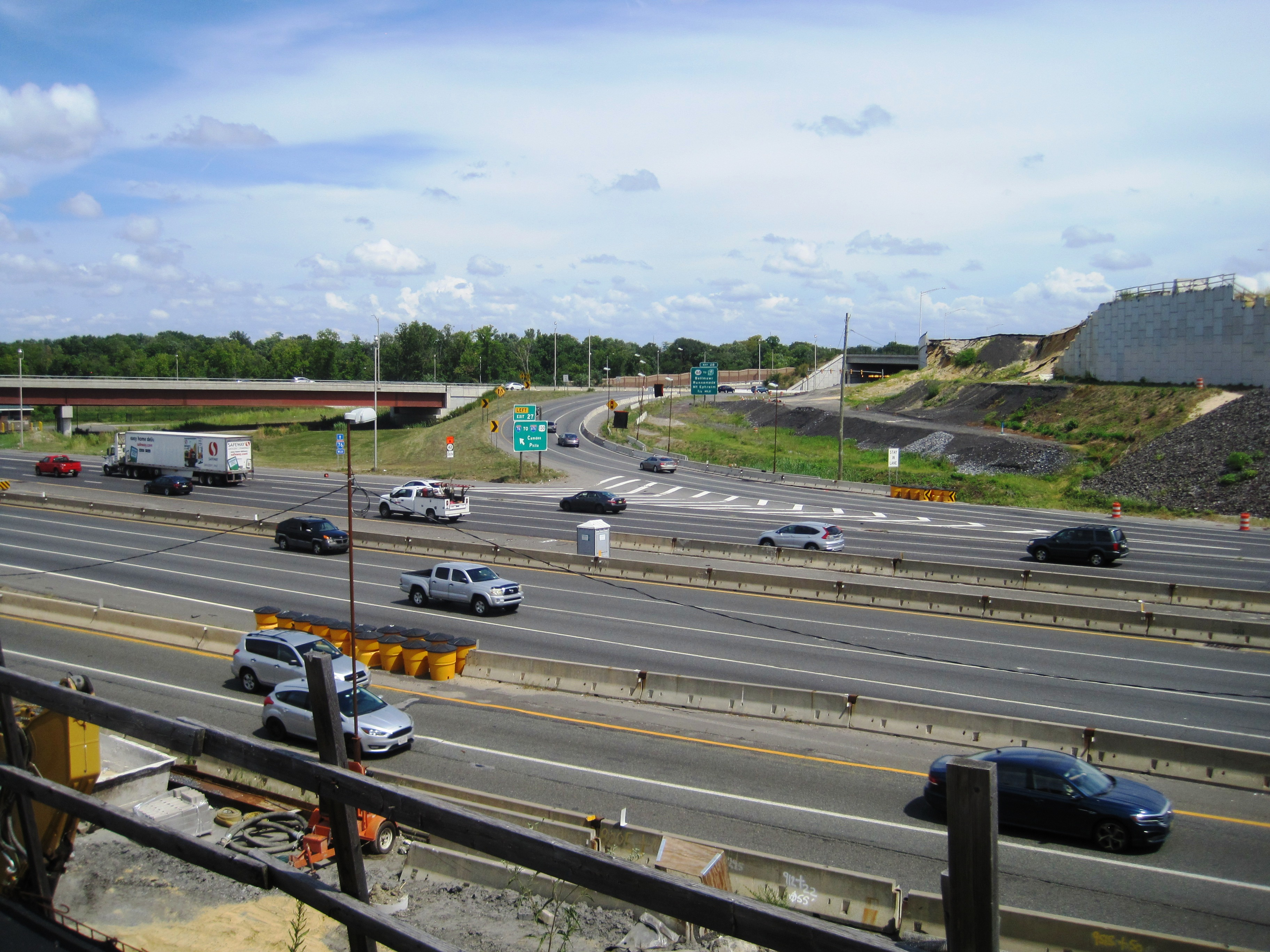
View of the I-76/I-295/Route 42 interchange construction in 2022

In 2013, the New Jersey Department of Transportation broke ground on a project to construct a straighter roadway for I-295 near the interchange of Route 42. This project, dubbed the I-295/I-76/Route 42 Direct Connection, will reconstruct the dangerous and congested Route 42/I-295/I-76 interchange, which currently requires traffic on I-295 to use 35-mile-per-hour (56 km/h) ramps that merge onto the North–South Freeway for a short distance, among a series of other indirect connections. In 2007, "Alternative D" for the reconstructed interchange was selected, calling for I-295 to cross over the North–South Freeway. This interchange was projected to cost $900 million (equivalent to $1.17 billion in 2024). The project is being constructed in four phases and was originally scheduled to be complete in 2021. However, delays in construction, including the collapse of a retaining wall on March 25, 2021, pushed the expected completion date to 2028. The collapsed retaining wall was eventually rebuilt.

== Exit list ==
In Delaware, the exit onto DE 141 is the only exit in the state signed with an exit number.

State	County	Location	mi	km	Old exit	New exit	Destinations	Notes
Delaware	New Castle	Newport	0.0	0.0		—	I-95 south – Baltimore	Southern terminus
Delaware	New Castle	Newport				5B	DE 141 north – Newport	No southbound entrance; signed as exit 5 southbound; exit number corresponds to I-95
Delaware	New Castle	Newport				—	I-95 north – Wilmington	Southbound exit and northbound entrance; Exit 5C (I-95 south)
Delaware	New Castle	Newport				—	I-495 north – Port of Wilm, Philadelphia	Southbound exit and northbound entrance; southern terminus of I-495
Delaware	New Castle	Wilmington Manor	1.9	3.1		—	US 13 / US 40 west – Wilmington, N C Airport, Dover	Southern end of the concurrency with US 40
Delaware	New Castle	Wilmington Manor				—	Landers Lane	Northbound exit only; no trucks over 5,000 pounds (2,300 kg)
Delaware	New Castle	Holloway Terrace	3.2	5.1		—	DE 9 – Wilmington, New Castle, VET MEM PARK	Serves Historic New Castle
Delaware	New Castle	Holloway Terrace	3.2	5.1		—	Delaware River and Bay Authority Headquarters	Southbound exit and entrance
Delaware River			5.7 0.0	9.2 0.0	Delaware Memorial Bridge (southbound toll)			
New Jersey	Salem	Pennsville Township	0.5	0.80	N.J. Turnpike begins			
New Jersey	Salem	Pennsville Township	0.7– 0.9	1.1– 1.4		1A (NB) 1 (SB)	Route 49 east – Pennsville, Salem	Signed as exit 1A northbound and exit 1 southbound; western terminus of Route 49; last southbound exit before toll
New Jersey	Salem	Pennsville Township	0.7– 0.9	1.1– 1.4		—	N.J. Turnpike north / US 40 east – Atlantic City, New York City	Northern end of the concurrency with N.J. Turnpike/US 40; northbound exit and southbound entrance
New Jersey	Salem	Pennsville Township	0.7– 0.9	1.1– 1.4		1B	US 130 north – Penns Grove	Northbound exit and southbound entrance; southern terminus of US 130; access to Salem Community College
New Jersey	Salem	Carneys Point Township	1.3– 1.6	2.1– 2.6		1C	Hook Road (NB) CR 551 south – Salem (SB)	Southern end of the concurrency with CR 551; signed for CR 551 south - Salem southbound and Hook Road northbound; no southbound entrance
New Jersey	Salem	Carneys Point Township	1.3– 1.6	2.1– 2.6		2A	I-295 south / US 40 west – Del Mem Br	Northbound exit only; provides a U-turn from exit 1C to access I-295 south
New Jersey	Salem	Carneys Point Township	1.9	3.1		2B–C	To N.J. Turnpike north / US 40 east / US 130 / CR 551 north – Deepwater, Woodstown	Northern end of the concurrency with CR 551; signed as exits 2B (to N.J. Turnpike north / US 40 east) and 2C (to US 130); access to Salem Community College
New Jersey	Salem	Carneys Point Township	4.4	7.1		4	Route 48 – Penns Grove, Woodstown	
New Jersey	Salem	Oldmans Township	7.1	11.4		7	Auburn, Pedricktown	Access via CR 643
New Jersey	Gloucester	Logan Township	10.3	16.6		10	Center Sq Rd – Swedesboro	Access via CR 620
New Jersey	Gloucester	Logan Township	11.9	19.2		11A–B (NB) 11 (SB)	US 322 to N.J. Turnpike – Mullica Hill, Bridgeport, Com Barry Br US 322 east to N.J. Turnpike – Mullica Hill (SB)	No southbound access to US 322 west; signed as exits 11A (east) and 11B (west) northbound and exit 11 southbound
New Jersey	Gloucester	Logan Township	14.3	23.0		13	US 130 south to US 322 west – Bridgeport, Com Barry Br	Southern end of the concurrency with US 130; southbound exit and northbound entrance
New Jersey	Gloucester	Logan Township	14.5	23.3		14	CR 684 to Route 44 – Repaupo, Gibbstown (NB) CR 684 – Repaupo (SB)	
New Jersey	Gloucester	Greenwich Township	15.4	24.8		15	CR 607 – Gibbstown, Harrisonville	
New Jersey	Gloucester	Greenwich Township	16.0	25.7		16A	CR 653 – Swedesboro, Paulsboro	
New Jersey	Gloucester	Greenwich Township	16.4	26.4		16B	CR 673 – Gibbstown, Mickleton	
New Jersey	Gloucester	Greenwich–East Greenwich township line	17.2	27.7		17	To CR 680 – Gibbstown	Access via Swedesboro Avenue
New Jersey	Gloucester	Greenwich Township–Paulsboro line	18.3– 18.4	29.5– 29.6		18	CR 667 / CR 678 – Paulsboro, Mt Royal, Clarksboro	
New Jersey	Gloucester	West Deptford Township	19.4	31.2		19	CR 656 – Mantua (NB) CR 656 to Route 44 – Paulsboro (SB)	
New Jersey	Gloucester	West Deptford Township	20.6	33.2		20	To CR 643 / CR 660 – Thorofare, Woodbury (NB) To Route 44 / CR 643 – Mantua, Thorofare (SB)	Access via Mid-Atlantic Parkway
New Jersey	Gloucester	West Deptford Township	21.8	35.1		21	CR 640 – National Park (NB) Route 44 south to CR 640 – Paulsboro, Woodbury (SB)	Northern terminus of Route 44; access to Red Bank Battlefield
New Jersey	Gloucester	West Deptford Township	22.9	36.9		22	CR 631 north to CR 644 / CR 642 – Red Bank, Woodbury (NB) CR 644 – Woodbury, Red Bank (SB)	Southern terminus of CR 631
New Jersey	Gloucester	West Deptford Township	23.6– 23.9	38.0– 38.5		23	US 130 north – Westville, Gloucester (NB) US 130 north to CR 642 – National Pk (SB)	Northern end of the concurrency with US 130
New Jersey	Gloucester	West Deptford–Deptford township line	24.5	39.4		24A	Route 45 south – Woodbury	Southbound exit and northbound entrance
New Jersey	Gloucester	Deptford Township–Westville line	24.6	39.6		24B	CR 551 – Westville, Woodbury Hts	Southbound exit and northbound entrance
New Jersey	Gloucester	Westville	25.1	40.4		25	Route 47 – Westville, Deptford, Glassboro	Southbound exit and northbound entrance; signed as exits 25A (south) and 25B (north)
New Jersey	Big Timber Creek				Bridge			
New Jersey	Camden	Bellmawr	25.9	41.7		26	Route 42 south to A.C. Expressway east – Washington Twp, Atlantic City	Northbound exit and southbound entrance; Exit 14A (Route 42)
New Jersey	Camden	Bellmawr	26.4	42.5		27A	I-76 west to I-676 north – Camden, Philadelphia	Northbound exit and southbound entrance; eastern terminus of I-76; Exit 1A (I-76)
New Jersey	Camden	Bellmawr	26.9	43.3		—	Route 42 south – Atlantic City	Southbound exit and northbound entrance; northern terminus of Route 42
New Jersey	Camden	Bellmawr	27.4	44.1		26 (SB) 27B (NB)	I-76 west to I-676 north / US 130 – Camden, Philadelphia	Eastern terminus of I-76; Exit 1 (I-76)
New Jersey	Camden	Bellmawr	28.1	45.2		28	Route 168 to N.J. Turnpike – Bellmawr, Runnemede, Mt Ephraim	
New Jersey	Camden	Barrington	30.0– 30.2	48.3– 48.6		29A–B (NB) 29 (SB)	US 30 – Lawnside, Berlin, Barrington, Haddon Hts, Collingswood (NB) US 30 – Barrington, Haddon Hts, Collingswood (SB)	Signed as exits 29A (east) and 29B (west) northbound and exit 29 southbound; southbound access via Copley Road
New Jersey	Camden	Lawnside	30.6	49.2		30	Warwick Rd – Lawnside, Haddonfield	Southbound exit and northbound entrance; access via CR 669
New Jersey	Camden	Cherry Hill	31.7	51.0		31	Woodcrest Sta	Access via East Essex Avenue
New Jersey	Camden	Cherry Hill	32.4	52.1		32	CR 561 – Haddonfield, Voorhees, Gibbsboro	Access to Indian King Tavern Museum
New Jersey	Camden	Cherry Hill	34.8	56.0		34	Route 70 – Marlton, Cherry Hill, Camden	Signed as exits 34A (east) and 34B (west)
New Jersey	Burlington	Mount Laurel	36.8	59.2		36	Route 73 to N.J. Turnpike – Berlin, Tacony Br	Signed as exits 36A (south) and 36B (north); access southbound I-295 to northbound Route 73 via Nixon Drive in Mount Laurel and Moorestown becoming Collins Road in Maple Shade
New Jersey	Burlington	Mount Laurel	40.6	65.3		40A–B (NB) 40 (SB)	Route 38 – Mt Holly, Moorestown (NB) Route 38 – Moorestown (SB)	No southbound access to Route 38 east; signed as exits 40A (east) and 40B (west) northbound and exit 40 southbound; access to Cooper University Hospital Trauma Center and Historic Mt Holly
New Jersey	Burlington	Mount Laurel	43.1	69.4		43A–B (SB) 43 (NB)	Rancocas Woods, Delran	Access via CR 635; signed as exits 43A (Rancocas Woods) and 43B (Delran) southbound and exit 43 northbound
New Jersey	Burlington	Westampton	44.9	72.3		45	Mount Holly, Willingboro	Access via CR 626; signed as exits 45A (Mount Holly) and 45B (Willingboro)
New Jersey	Burlington	Burlington Township	47.5	76.4		47	CR 541 to N.J. Turnpike – Mount Holly, Burlington	Signed as exits 47A (south) and 47B (north)
New Jersey	Burlington	Mansfield Township	52.3	84.2		52	Columbus, Florence	Access via CR 656; signed as exits 52A (Columbus) and 52B (Florence)
New Jersey	Burlington	Bordentown Township	56.1	90.3		56	US 206 to I-95 / N.J. Turnpike / Route 68 / Rising Sun Rd	Northbound exit and southbound entrance
New Jersey	Burlington	Bordentown Township	56.8	91.4		57A–B (SB) 57 (NB)	US 130 – Burlington, Bordentown (SB) US 130 north to US 206 north – Bordentown (NB)	No northbound access to US 130 south; signed as exits 57A (north) and 57B (south) southbound and exit 57 northbound
New Jersey	Mercer	Hamilton Township	60.2	96.9		60A–B (SB) 60 (NB)	I-195 east to I-95 / N.J. Turnpike – Belmar Route 29 north to Route 129 – Trenton	Signed as exits 60A (east) and 60B (north) southbound and exit 60 northbound; western terminus of I-195; Exits 1A–B (I-195); southern terminus of Route 29
New Jersey	Mercer	Hamilton Township	61.4	98.8		61A–B (NB) 61A (SB)	Arena Drive – White Horse Ave, Olden Ave (NB) Arena Drive – White Horse Ave (SB)	No southbound access to Arena Drive west; signed as exits 61A (east) and 61B (west) northbound and exit 61A southbound; access via CR 620
New Jersey	Mercer	Hamilton Township	61.8	99.5		62	Olden Ave North	Southbound exit and northbound entrance; access via CR 622 north
New Jersey	Mercer	Hamilton Township	63.9– 64.0	102.8– 103.0		63A–B (NB) 63 (SB)	Route 33 to CR 535 – Mercerville, Trenton (NB) Route 33 west – Trenton (SB)	No southbound access to Route 33 west; signed as exits 63A (east) and 63B (west) northbound and exit 63 southbound
New Jersey	Mercer	Hamilton Township	64.6	104.0		64	CR 535 north to Route 33 east – Mercerville	Southbound exit and northbound entrance
New Jersey	Mercer	Hamilton Township	65.2	104.9		65	Sloan Ave	Signed as exits 65A (east) and 65B (west); serves Hamilton Station; access via CR 649
New Jersey	Mercer	Lawrence Township	67.6	108.8		67A–B (NB) 67 (SB)	US 1 – New Brunswick, Trenton	Signed as exits 67A (north) and 67B (south) northbound and exit 67 southbound
New Jersey	Mercer	Lawrence Township	68.2	109.8	8B	68A–B (NB)	Princeton Pike – Trenton, Princeton	No southbound access to Princeton Pike south; signed as exits 68A (Princeton) and 68B (Trenton) northbound; access via CR 583
New Jersey	Mercer	Lawrence Township	68.8	110.7	8A	68B (SB)	CR 546 east to Princeton Pike	Southbound exit only
New Jersey	Mercer	Lawrence Township	69.2	111.4	7	69	US 206 – Lawrenceville, Princeton, Trenton	Signed into exits 69A (north) and 69B (south); serves Rider University
New Jersey	Mercer	Lawrence Township	70.7	113.8	5	71	Federal City Rd	Northbound exit and southbound entrance; signed as exits 71A (north) and 71B (south)
New Jersey	Mercer	Hopewell Township	72.1	116.0	4	72	Route 31 – Ewing, Pennington	Serves The College of New Jersey
New Jersey	Mercer	Hopewell Township	73.5	118.3	3	73	Scotch Road – General Aviation	Signed as exits 73A (north) and 73B (south); access via CR 611
New Jersey	Mercer	Ewing Township	74.8	120.4	2	75	CR 579 – West Trenton, Passenger Terminal	Serves West Trenton Station
New Jersey	Mercer	Ewing Township	76.3	122.8	1	76	Route 29 – Trenton, Lambertville	No trucks over 13 tons; last northbound exit before toll
Delaware River			76.4 10.3	123.0 16.6	Scudder Falls Bridge (north/westbound toll; E-ZPass or toll-by-plate)			
Pennsylvania	Bucks	Lower Makefield Township	10.075	16.214	51	10	Yardley, New Hope (WB) New Hope (EB)	Access via Taylorsville Road; Yardley not signed eastbound; serves Washington Crossing Historic Park
Pennsylvania	Bucks	Lower Makefield Township	8.150	13.116	49	8	PA 332 – Newtown (WB) PA 332 – Newtown, Yardley (EB)	Yardley not signed westbound; serves Bucks County Community College and Tyler State Park
Pennsylvania	Bucks	Middletown Township	5.611	9.030	46	5	US 1 – Trenton, Langhorne	Signed as exits 5B (south) and 5A (north); serves Sesame Place and Morrisville
Pennsylvania	Bucks	Middletown Township	3.627	5.837	44	3	PA 413 / US 1 Bus. – Penndel, Levittown	Serves Cairn University
Pennsylvania	Bucks	Bristol Township	0.574	0.924		1	To PA 413 – Bristol	Westbound exit only; feeds into I-95 exit 39; serves Burlington–Bristol Bridge
Pennsylvania	Bucks	Bristol Township	0.000	0.000		—	I-95 south – Philadelphia	Western terminus; Exit 40 (I-95)
1.000 mi = 1.609 km; 1.000 km = 0.621 mi: Concurrency terminus; Incomplete access; Tolled
