= Auburn, New Jersey =

Populated place in Salem County, New Jersey, US

- Census-designated place
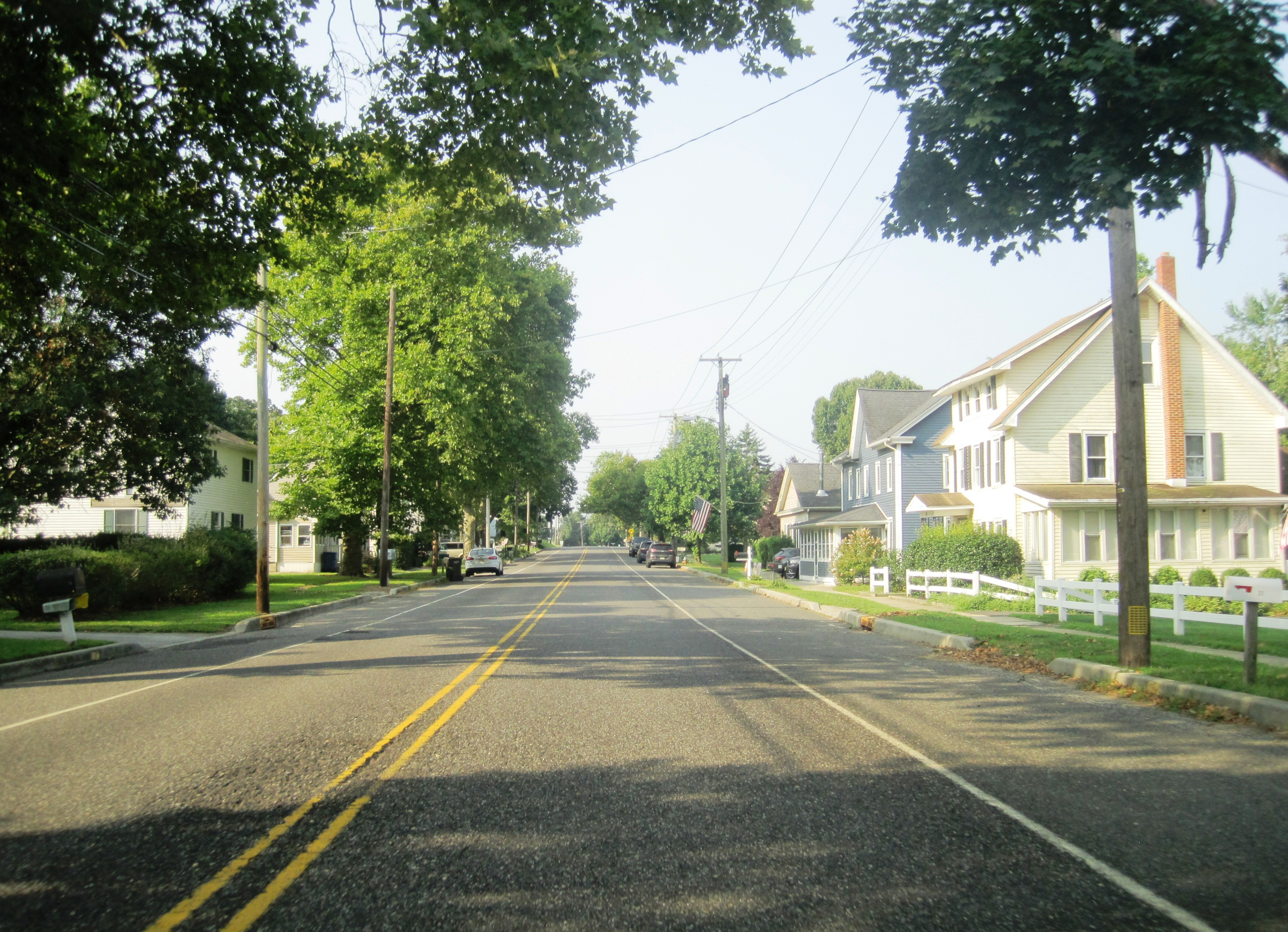
- Southbound CR 551 in Auburn

- Location in Salem County Location in New Jersey Location in the United States
- Coordinates: 39°42′39″N 75°22′3″W
- Country: United States
- State: New Jersey
- County: Salem
- Townships: Oldmans; Pilesgrove

Area
  - Total: 4.30 sq mi (11.13 km^{2})
  - Land: 4.25 sq mi (11.01 km^{2})
  - Water: 0.046 sq mi (0.12 km^{2})
- Elevation: 77 ft (23 m)

Population (2020)
  - Total: 1,057
  - Density: 248.6/sq mi (96.00/km^{2})
- Time zone: UTC−05:00 (Eastern (EST))
  - Summer (DST): UTC−04:00 (EDT)
- ZIP Codes: 08085 (Swedesboro); 08098 (Woodstown); 08067 (Pedricktown)
- Area code: 856
- FIPS code: 34-02170
- GNIS feature ID: 2806229

Auburn is an unincorporated community and census-designated place (CDP) in Salem County, in the U.S. state of New Jersey. It encompasses the Auburn section of Oldmans Township and extends southeast to include rural and semi-suburban land in Pilesgrove Township.

It is in northern Salem County, bordered to the northeast by Oldmans Creek, which separates the community from Woolwich Township in Gloucester County. The New Jersey Turnpike passes through the northern part of the CDP, just south of Auburn village. The nearest turnpike access is 7 miles (11 km) to the southwest at the southern terminus of the highway near the Delaware Memorial Bridge, or 6 miles (10 km) to the northeast at Exit 2 near Swedesboro.

Auburn was first listed as a CDP prior to the 2020 census. As of the 2020 census, its population was 1,057.

== Demographics ==
Historical population
Census	Pop.	Note	%±
2020	1,057		—
U.S. Decennial Census; 2020

Auburn first appeared as a census designated place in the 2020 U.S. census.

=== 2020 census ===
Auburn CDP, New Jersey – Racial and ethnic composition Note: the US Census treats Hispanic/Latino as an ethnic category. This table excludes Latinos from the racial categories and assigns them to a separate category. Hispanics/Latinos may be of any race.
Race / Ethnicity (NH = Non-Hispanic)	Pop 2020	% 2020
White alone (NH)	949	89.78%
Black or African American alone (NH)	26	2.46%
Native American or Alaska Native alone (NH)	0	0.00%
Asian alone (NH)	11	1.04%
Native Hawaiian or Pacific Islander alone (NH)	0	0.00%
Other race alone (NH)	0	0.00%
Mixed race or Multiracial (NH)	27	2.55%
Hispanic or Latino (any race)	44	4.16%
Total	1,057	100.00%
