= Oldmans Township, New Jersey =

Township in Salem County, New Jersey, US

- Township
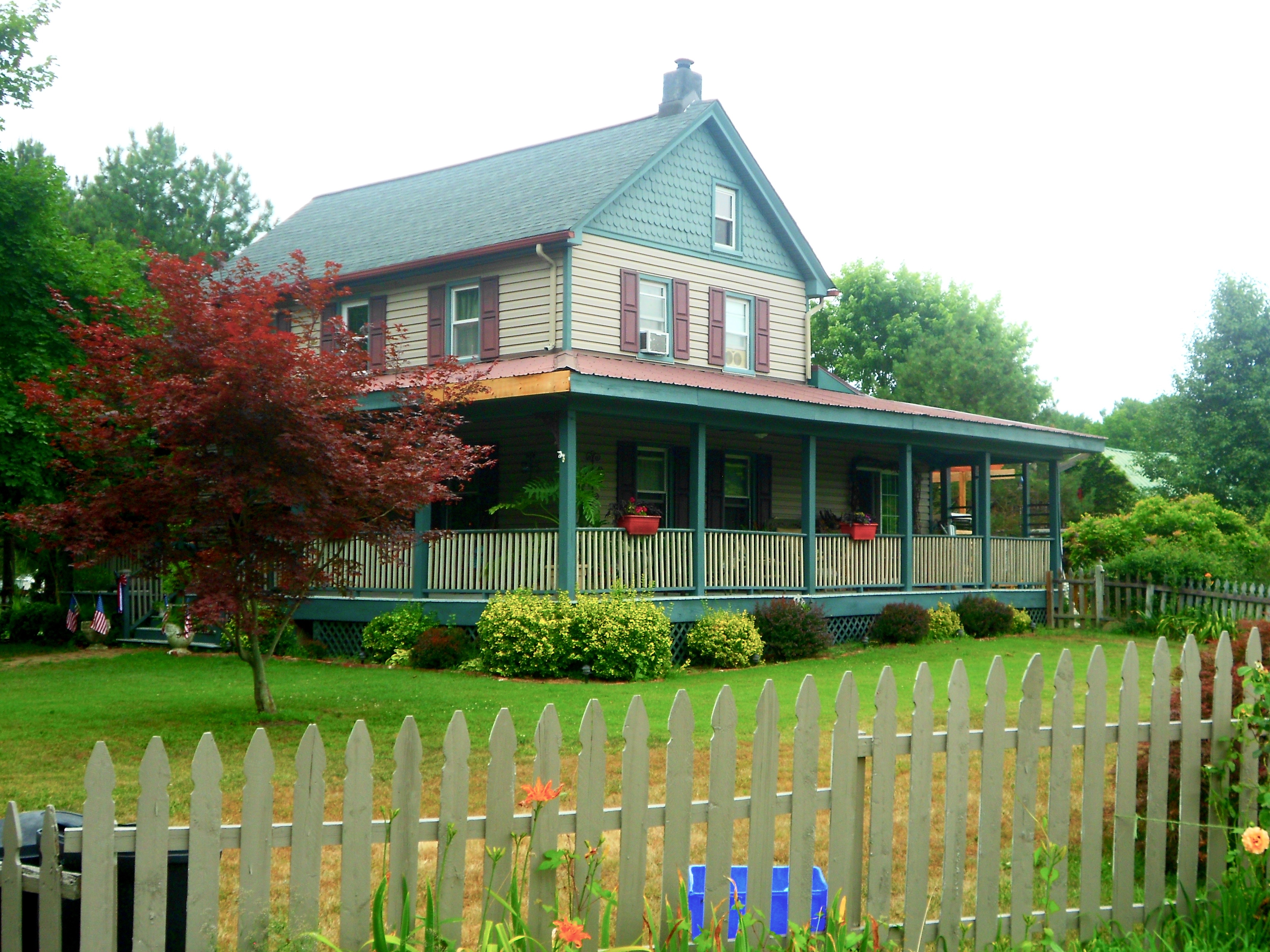
- Farm house at Sweet Haven Farms

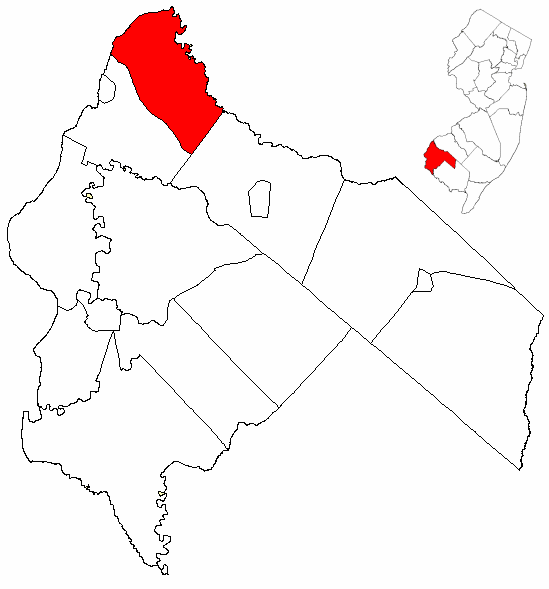
- Oldmans Township highlighted in Salem County. Inset map: Salem County highlighted in the State of New Jersey.

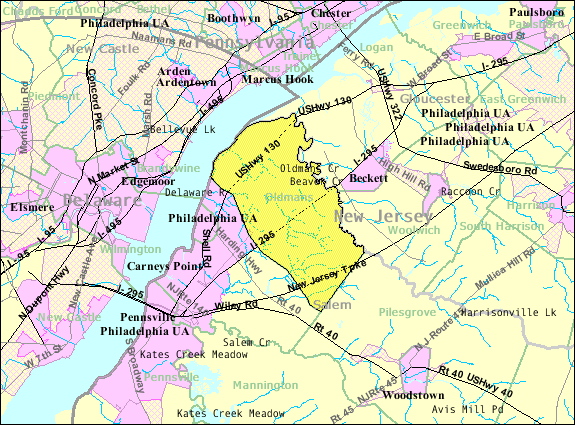
- Census Bureau map of Oldmans Township, New Jersey

- Location in Salem County Location in New Jersey Location in the United States
- Coordinates: 39°45′24″N 75°25′49″W
- Country: United States
- State: New Jersey
- County: Salem
- Incorporated: February 7, 1881

Government
  - Type: Township
  - Body: Township Committee
  - Mayor: Dean W. Sparks (R, term ends December 31, 2023)
  - Municipal clerk: Melinda Taylor

Area
  - Total: 20.69 sq mi (53.58 km^{2})
  - Land: 19.51 sq mi (50.53 km^{2})
  - Water: 1.18 sq mi (3.05 km^{2}) 5.70%
  - Rank: 137th of 565 in state 9th of 15 in county
- Elevation: 30 ft (9.1 m)

Population (2020)
  - Total: 1,910
  - Estimate (2023): 1,928
  - Rank: 490th of 565 in state 11th of 15 in county
  - Density: 97.9/sq mi (37.8/km^{2})
  - Rank: 543rd of 565 in state 11th of 15 in county
- Time zone: UTC−05:00 (Eastern (EST))
  - Summer (DST): UTC−04:00 (Eastern (EDT))
- ZIP Code: 08067 – Pedricktown; 08085 – Auburn
- Area code: 856
- FIPS code: 3403354810
- GNIS feature ID: 0882136
- Website: www.oldmanstownship.com

Oldmans Township is a township in Salem County, in the U.S. state of New Jersey. As of the 2020 United States census, the township's population was 1,910, an increase of 137 (+7.7%) from the 2010 census count of 1,773, which in turn reflected a decline of 25 (−1.4%) from the 1,798 counted in the 2000 census.

Oldmans Township was incorporated on February 7, 1881, from portions of Upper Penns Neck Township (now Carneys Point Township). The township's name is a corruption of "Alderman's".

It is a dry town, where alcohol cannot be sold legally, though alcohol is available at the winery in the township.

== Geography ==
According to the United States Census Bureau, Oldmans township had a total area of 20.69 square miles (53.58 km^{2}), including 19.51 square miles (50.53 km^{2}) of land and 1.18 square miles (3.05 km^{2}) of water (5.70%).

Pedricktown (with a 2020 Census population of 487) and Auburn (1,057) are unincorporated communities and census-designated places (CDP) located within Oldmans Township.

Unincorporated communities, localities and place names located partially or completely within the township include Dolbows Landing, Jumbo, Magnolia, Oldmans Point, Parkertown and Perkintown.

The township borders Carneys Point Township and Pilesgrove Township in Salem County; and borders the Delaware River and Oldmans Creek, which serves as its border with Logan Township and Woolwich Township in Gloucester County.

== Demographics ==
Historical population
Census	Pop.	Note	%±
1890	1,432		—
1900	1,382		−3.5%
1910	1,364		−1.3%
1920	1,328		−2.6%
1930	1,431		7.8%
1940	1,722		20.3%
1950	1,657		−3.8%
1960	2,913		75.8%
1970	2,088		−28.3%
1980	1,847		−11.5%
1990	1,683		−8.9%
2000	1,798		6.8%
2010	1,773		−1.4%
2020	1,910		7.7%
2023 (est.)	1,928		0.9%
Population sources: 1890–2000 1890–1920 1890; 1890–1910 1910–1930; 1940–2000 2000; 2010 2020

=== 2010 census ===
The 2010 United States census counted 1,773 people, 652 households, and 502 families in the township. The population density was 91.1 inhabitants per square mile (35.2/km^{2}). There were 699 housing units at an average density of 35.9 per square mile (13.9/km^{2}). The racial makeup was 87.48% (1,551) White, 7.73% (137) Black or African American, 0.23% (4) Native American, 0.90% (16) Asian, 0.00% (0) Pacific Islander, 2.31% (41) from other races, and 1.35% (24) from two or more races. Hispanic or Latino of any race were 6.99% (124) of the population.

Of the 652 households, 31.3% had children under the age of 18; 58.9% were married couples living together; 11.7% had a female householder with no husband present and 23.0% were non-families. Of all households, 17.8% were made up of individuals and 5.8% had someone living alone who was 65 years of age or older. The average household size was 2.71 and the average family size was 3.04.

23.1% of the population were under the age of 18, 7.3% from 18 to 24, 22.9% from 25 to 44, 33.2% from 45 to 64, and 13.4% who were 65 years of age or older. The median age was 42.5 years. For every 100 females, the population had 95.5 males. For every 100 females ages 18 and older there were 96.4 males.

The Census Bureau's 2006–2010 American Community Survey showed that (in 2010 inflation-adjusted dollars) median household income was $66,016 (with a margin of error of +/− $7,844) and the median family income was $68,077 (+/− $6,044). Males had a median income of $55,565 (+/− $4,420) versus $32,283 (+/− $4,346) for females. The per capita income for the borough was $29,150 (+/− $2,268). About 3.3% of families and 5.2% of the population were below the poverty line, including 7.5% of those under age 18 and 5.8% of those age 65 or over.

=== 2000 census ===
As of the 2000 United States census there were 1,798 people, 654 households, and 517 families residing in the township. The population density was 90.0 inhabitants per square mile (34.7/km^{2}). There were 694 housing units at an average density of 34.8 per square mile (13.4/km^{2}). The racial makeup of the township was 86.82% White, 9.62% African American, 0.28% Native American, 0.17% Asian, 2.00% from other races, and 1.11% from two or more races. Hispanic or Latino of any race were 4.17% of the population.

There were 654 households, out of which 32.6% had children under the age of 18 living with them, 63.9% were married couples living together, 10.9% had a female householder with no husband present, and 20.9% were non-families. 17.0% of all households were made up of individuals, and 5.7% had someone living alone who was 65 years of age or older. The average household size was 2.74 and the average family size was 3.07.

In the township the population was spread out, with 24.6% under the age of 18, 7.3% from 18 to 24, 29.0% from 25 to 44, 27.1% from 45 to 64, and 11.8% who were 65 years of age or older. The median age was 39 years. For every 100 females, there were 102.2 males. For every 100 females age 18 and over, there were 102.8 males.

The median income for a household in the township was $57,589, and the median income for a family was $64,091. Males had a median income of $45,469 versus $31,705 for females. The per capita income for the township was $22,495. About 6.1% of families and 8.1% of the population were below the poverty line, including 10.2% of those under age 18 and 13.3% of those age 65 or over.

== Government ==
=== Local government ===
Oldmans Township is governed under the Township form of New Jersey municipal government, one of 141 municipalities (of the 564) statewide that use this form, the second-most commonly used form of government in the state. The governing body is comprised of a three-member Township Committee, whose members are elected directly by the voters at-large in partisan elections to serve three-year terms of office on a staggered basis, with one seat coming up for election each year as part of the November general election in a three-year cycle. At an annual reorganization meeting, the council selects one of its members to serves as mayor and another as deputy mayor.

As of 2022, members of the Oldmans Township Committee are Mayor Dean Sparks (R, term on committee ends December 31, 2023; term as mayor ends 2022), Deputy Mayor Anthony Musumeci Jr. (R, term on committee ends 2024; term, as deputy mayor end 2022) and George W. Bradford (R, 2022).

=== Federal, state and county representation ===
Oldmans Township is located in the 2nd Congressional District and is part of New Jersey's 3rd state legislative district.

For the 119th United States Congress, New Jersey's 2nd congressional district is represented by Jeff Van Drew (R, Dennis Township). New Jersey is represented in the United States Senate by Democrats Cory Booker (Newark, term ends 2027) and Andy Kim (Moorestown, term ends 2031).

For the 2026–2027 session, the 3rd legislative district of the New Jersey Legislature is represented in the State Senate by John Burzichelli (D, Paulsboro) and in the General Assembly by David Bailey (D, Woodstown) and Heather Simmons (D, Glassboro).

Salem County is governed by a five-member Board of County Commissioners who are elected at-large to serve three-year terms of office on a staggered basis, with either one or two seats coming up for election each year. At an annual reorganization meeting held in the beginning of January, the board selects a Director and a Deputy Director from among its members. As of 2025, Salem County's Commissioners (with party, residence, and term-end year listed in parentheses) are:

Director Benjamin H. Laury (R, Elmer, 2027), Deputy Director Cordy Taylor (R, Oldmans Township, 2028), Paul Collier (R, Lower Alloways Creek, 2027), Ed Ramsey (R, Pittsgrove Township, 2026), and Daniel Timmerman (R, Elmer, 2028).

Constitutional officers elected on a countywide basis are: Clerk Dale A. Cross (R, Pennsville Township, 2029), Sheriff Charles M. Miller (R, Salem, 2027) and Surrogate Gordon J. Ostrum Jr. (R, Pilesgrove Township, 2030).

=== Politics ===
As of March 2011, there were a total of 1,251 registered voters in Oldmans Township, of which 321 (25.7% vs. 30.6% countywide) were registered as Democrats, 385 (30.8% vs. 21.0%) were registered as Republicans and 545 (43.6% vs. 48.4%) were registered as Unaffiliated. There were no voters registered to other parties. Among the township's 2010 Census population, 70.6% (vs. 64.6% in Salem County) were registered to vote, including 91.8% of those ages 18 and over (vs. 84.4% countywide).

Gubernatorial election results for Oldmans Township
Year	Republican		Democratic		Third party(ies)	
Year	No.	%	No.	%	No.	%
2025	498	57.31%	363	41.77%	8	0.92%
2021	510	67.64%	233	30.90%	11	1.46%
2017	314	53.04%	246	41.55%	32	5.41%
2013	432	69.01%	176	28.12%	18	2.88%
2009	337	51.85%	226	34.77%	87	13.38%
2005	311	48.07%	311	48.07%	25	3.86%

In the 2012 presidential election, Republican Mitt Romney received 51.0% of the vote (477 cast), ahead of Democrat Barack Obama with 47.9% (448 votes), and other candidates with 1.2% (11 votes), among the 941 ballots cast by the township's 1,320 registered voters (5 ballots were spoiled), for a turnout of 71.3%. In the 2008 presidential election, Republican John McCain received 501 votes (51.6% vs. 46.6% countywide), ahead of Democrat Barack Obama with 440 votes (45.4% vs. 50.4%) and other candidates with 12 votes (1.2% vs. 1.6%), among the 970 ballots cast by the township's 1,263 registered voters, for a turnout of 76.8% (vs. 71.8% in Salem County). In the 2004 presidential election, Republican George W. Bush received 516 votes (56.1% vs. 52.5% countywide), ahead of Democrat John Kerry with 396 votes (43.0% vs. 45.9%) and other candidates with 6 votes (0.7% vs. 1.0%), among the 920 ballots cast by the township's 1,228 registered voters, for a turnout of 74.9% (vs. 71.0% in the whole county).

United States presidential election results for Oldsman Township 2024 2020 2016 2012 2008 2004
Year	Republican		Democratic		Third party(ies)	
Year	No.	%	No.	%	No.	%
2024	676	59.82%	430	38.05%	24	2.12%
2020	680	59.34%	440	38.39%	26	2.27%
2016	590	59.30%	370	37.19%	35	3.52%
2012	477	50.96%	448	47.86%	11	1.18%
2008	501	52.57%	440	46.17%	12	1.26%
2004	516	56.21%	396	43.14%	6	0.65%

In the 2013 gubernatorial election, Republican Chris Christie received 69.0% of the vote (432 cast), ahead of Democrat Barbara Buono with 28.1% (176 votes), and other candidates with 2.9% (18 votes), among the 633 ballots cast by the township's 1,338 registered voters (7 ballots were spoiled), for a turnout of 47.3%. In the 2009 gubernatorial election, Republican Chris Christie received 337 votes (51.4% vs. 46.1% countywide), ahead of Democrat Jon Corzine with 226 votes (34.5% vs. 39.9%), Independent Chris Daggett with 77 votes (11.7% vs. 9.7%) and other candidates with 10 votes (1.5% vs. 2.0%), among the 656 ballots cast by the township's 1,246 registered voters, yielding a 52.6% turnout (vs. 47.3% in the county).

United States Senate election results for Oldmans Township1
Year	Republican		Democratic		Third party(ies)	
Year	No.	%	No.	%	No.	%
2024	670	59.71%	418	37.25%	34	3.03%
2018	490	60.49%	282	34.81%	38	4.69%
2012	415	45.81%	452	49.89%	39	4.30%
2006	352	51.24%	315	45.85%	20	2.91%

United States Senate election results for Oldmans Township2
Year	Republican		Democratic		Third party(ies)	
Year	No.	%	No.	%	No.	%
2020	659	58.01%	437	38.47%	40	3.52%
2014	324	55.10%	237	40.31%	27	4.59%
2013	199	61.61%	119	36.84%	5	1.55%
2008	441	46.87%	454	48.25%	46	4.89%

== Education ==
The Oldmans Township School District serves public school students in kindergarten through eighth grade at Oldmans Township School. As of the 2018–19 school year, the district, comprised of one school, had an enrollment of 290 students and 22.5 classroom teachers (on an FTE basis), for a student–teacher ratio of 12.9:1.

A majority of public school students in ninth through twelfth grades from Oldmans Township (more than 70% in 2018) attend Penns Grove High School as part of a sending/receiving relationship with the Penns Grove-Carneys Point Regional School District, with the balance (the remaining 30%) attending Woodstown High School in the Woodstown-Pilesgrove Regional School District, which also serves students from Alloway Township and Upper Pittsgrove Township. Students from Oldmans Township living west of Interstate 295 are sent to Penns Grove, while those east of the highway are sent to Woodstown. As of the 2018–19 school year, Penns Grove High School had an enrollment of 508 students and 50.0 classroom teachers (on an FTE basis), for a student–teacher ratio of 10.2:1, while Woodstown High School had an enrollment of 603 students and 48.6 classroom teachers (on an FTE basis), for a student–teacher ratio of 12.4:1.

In 2016, the district commissioned a study by the Southern Regional Institute and Educational Technology Training Center at Stockton University to consider sending all students in grades 9–12 to Woodstown High School. The study concluded that Woodstown has the capacity to handle all of the students from Oldmans Township, but noted that the withdrawal from Penns Grove would results in a small decrease in the number of white students in that district's high school. In 2018, the Oldmans Township district sought permission from the Commissioner of Education to send all students to Woodstown, which has been opposed by the Penns Grove district based on the financial impact caused by the loss of tuition.

Some students also attend Gloucester Catholic High School in Gloucester City.

== Transportation ==
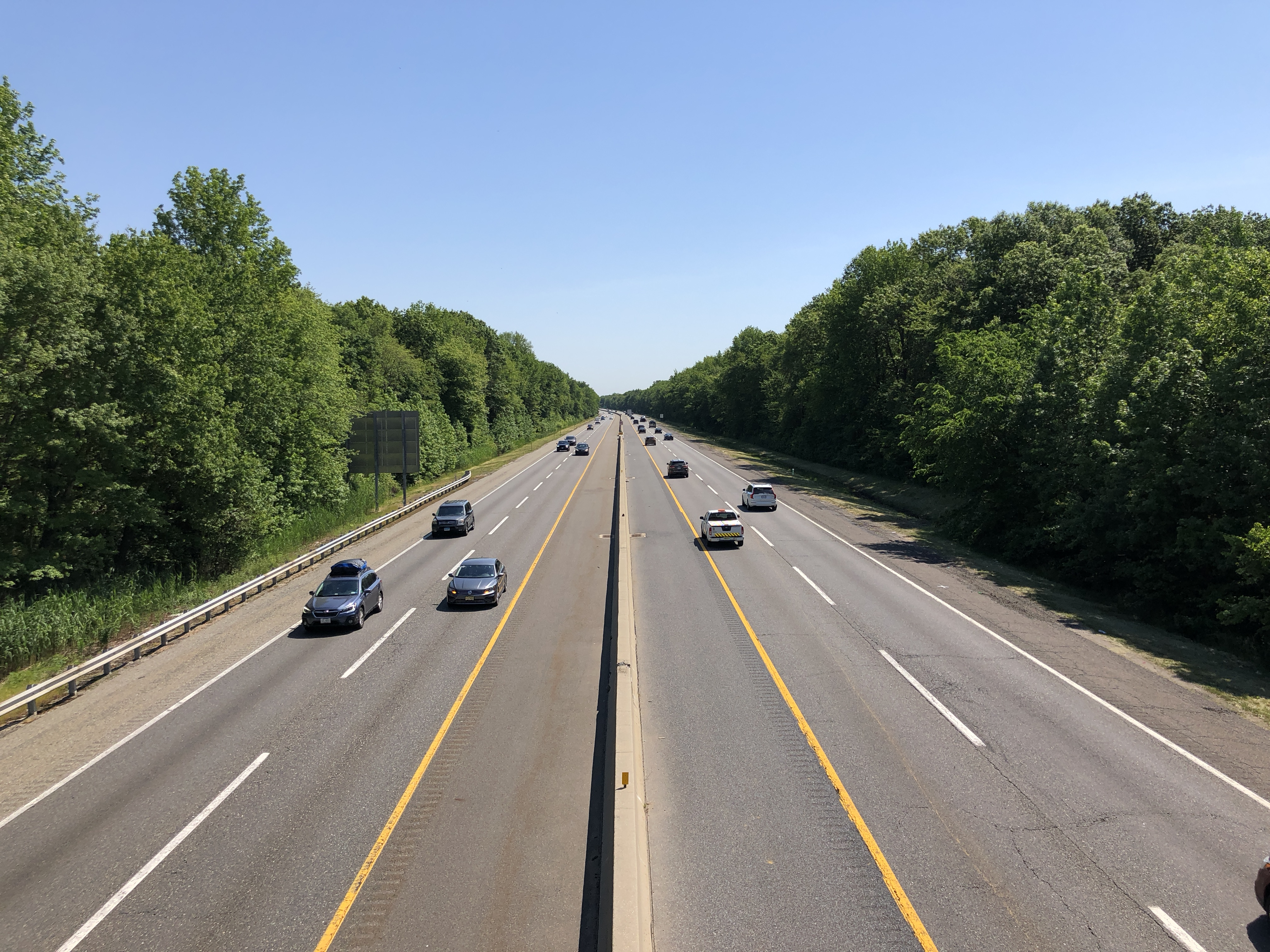
The New Jersey Turnpike in Oldmans Township

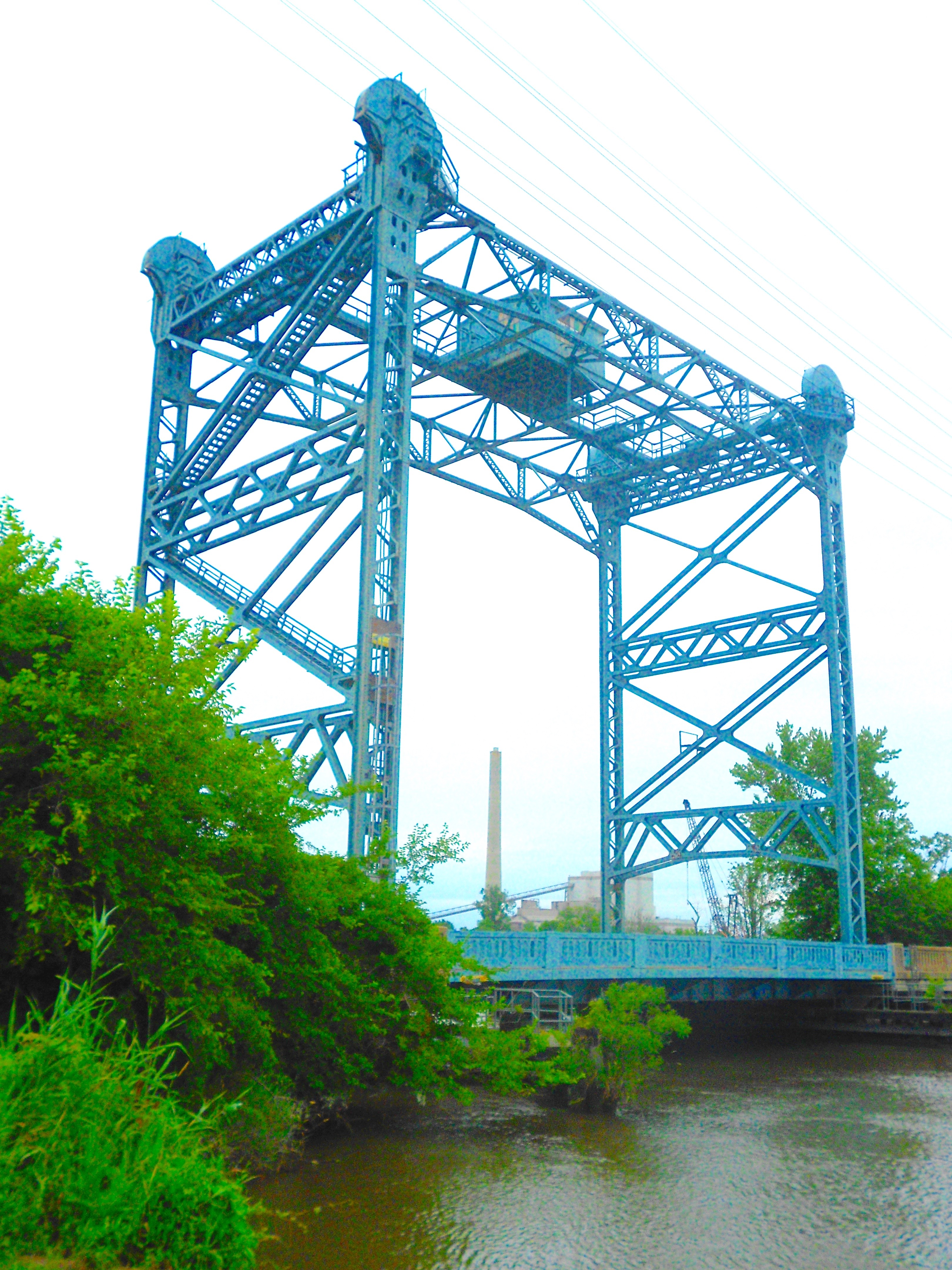
Bridge on U.S. Route 130 over Oldmans Creek

=== Roads and highways ===
As of May 2010, the township had a total of 40.89 miles (65.81 km) of roadways, of which 7.12 miles (11.46 km) were maintained by the municipality, 24.32 miles (39.14 km) by Salem County, 7.25 miles (11.67 km) by the New Jersey Department of Transportation and 2.20 miles (3.54 km) by the New Jersey Turnpike Authority.

U.S. Route 130 passes through the northwestern part of the municipality while Interstate 295 travels through the center of the township and includes exit 7.

The New Jersey Turnpike passes through southern Oldmans. Two of the turnpike's service areas, named for people who lived or worked in New Jersey, are located in the township. From south to north, these are the Clara Barton Service Area (named for Clara Barton): southbound, milepost 5.4, and the John Fenwick Service Area (named for John Fenwick; northbound, milepost 5.4).

=== Public transportation ===
NJ Transit provides bus service between Pennsville Township and Philadelphia on the 402 route.

The Spitfire Aerodrome (FAA LID: 7N7) is a small municipal airport located in the township, and is the only one of its kind in Salem County.

== Notable people ==
People who were born in, residents of, or otherwise closely associated with Oldmans Township include:

- Robert W. Camac (1940–2001), thoroughbred horse trainer
- Johnny Gaudreau (1993–2024), hockey player who played in the NHL for the Calgary Flames and the Columbus Blue Jackets
- Jim Leonard (1910–1993), American football running back who played in the NFL for the Philadelphia Eagles
