= Oldmans Township Airport =

- IATA: none; ICAO: none; FAA LID: 7N7

Summary
- Airport type: Defunct
- Owner: Oldmans Township Airport Authority, Inc.
- Operator: Steven R Martorano
- Serves: Pedricktown, New Jersey
- Closed: June 2023
- Elevation AMSL: 40 ft / 12 m
- Coordinates: 39°44′08″N 075°23′52″W
- Website: https://K7N7.net

Map
- Interactive map of Oldmans Township Airport

Runways
Direction	Length		Surface
Direction	ft	m	Surface
7/25	2,419	737	Asphalt

Statistics (2008)
- Aircraft operations: 16,971
- Based aircraft: 37
- Source: Federal Aviation Administration

Oldmans Township Airport (FAA LID: 7N7) was a public use airport located two nautical miles (3.7 km) south of the central business district of Pedricktown, in Oldmans Township, Salem County, New Jersey, United States. It was privately owned by Oldmans Township Airport Authority, Inc. The airport was known as Old Mans Airport until it was renamed in 2001 to Spitfire Aerodrome, after being purchased by Spitfire Aerospace Technologies, Inc., until 2021.

The airport was closed in 2023 to make way for warehouse development.

== Facilities and aircraft ==
At the time of its closure, Oldmans Township Airport covered an area of 48 acres (19 ha) at an elevation of 40 feet (12 m) above mean sea level. It had one asphalt paved runway designated 7/25 which measured 2,419 by 60 feet (737 x 18 m).

For the 12-month period ending April 21, 2008, the airport had 16,971 general aviation aircraft operations, an average of 46 per day. At that time there were 37 aircraft based at this airport: 70% single-engine, 27% helicopter and 3% multi-engine.
