= Pedricktown, New Jersey =

Populated place in Salem County, New Jersey, US

- Census-designated place
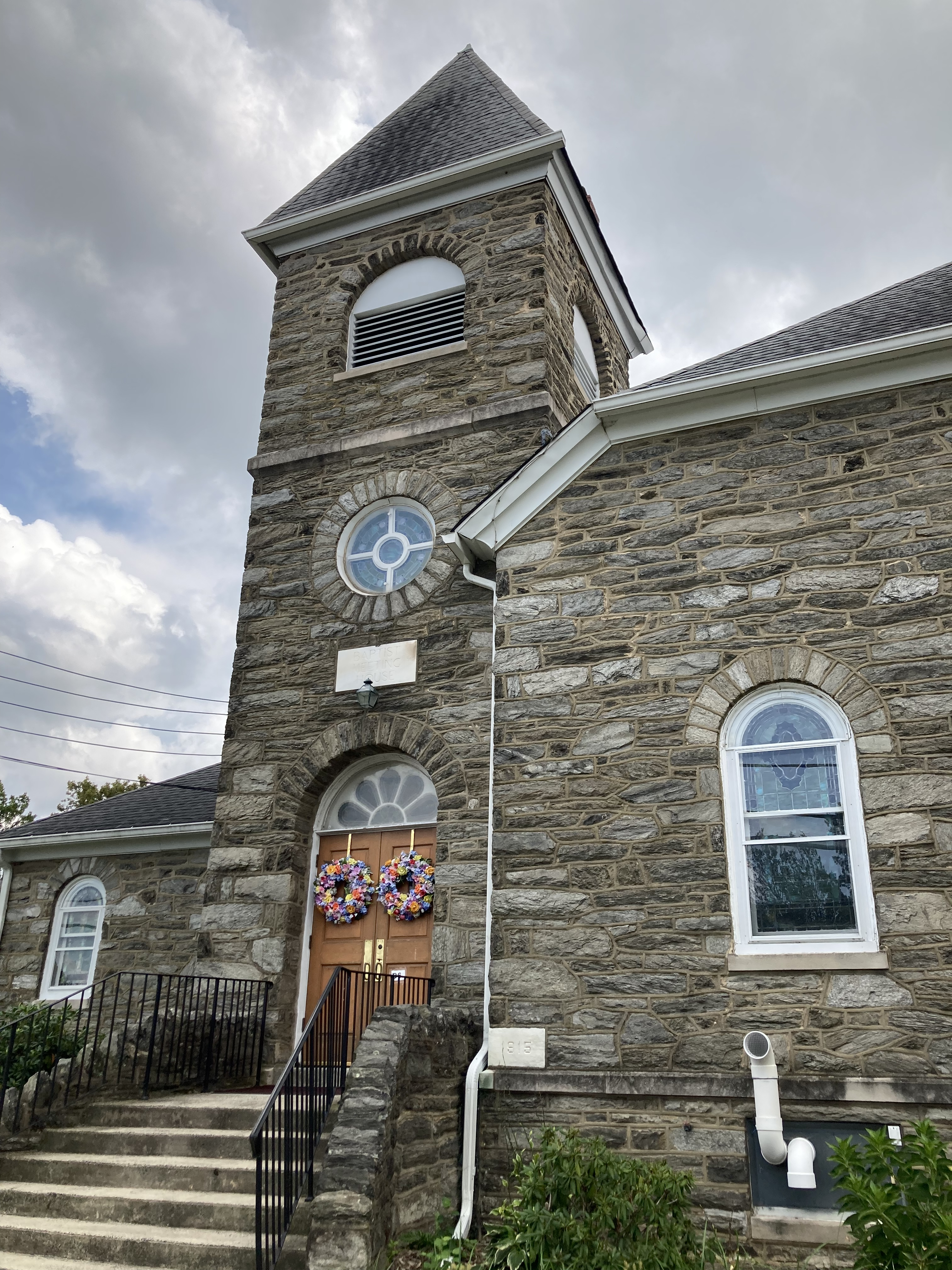
- First Baptist Church in the community

- Location in Salem County Location in New Jersey Location in the United States
- Coordinates: 39.76643°N 75.407591°W
- Country: United States
- State: New Jersey
- County: Salem
- Township: Oldmans

Area
  - Total: 1.83 sq mi (4.73 km^{2})
  - Land: 1.74 sq mi (4.51 km^{2})
  - Water: 0.085 sq mi (0.22 km^{2}) 0.21%
- Elevation: 9.8 ft (3 m)

Population (2020)
  - Total: 487
  - Density: 279.6/sq mi (107.97/km^{2})
- Time zone: UTC−05:00 (Eastern (EST))
  - Summer (DST): UTC−04:00 (Eastern (EDT))
- ZIP Code: 08067
- Area code: 856
- FIPS code: 34-57360
- GNIS feature ID: 02584016

Pedricktown is an unincorporated community and census-designated place (CDP) located within Oldmans Township, in Salem County, in the U.S. state of New Jersey. As of the 2020 census, Pedricktown had a population of 487. The area is served as United States Postal Service ZIP Code 08067.

== History ==
In June 1675 in Shadwell, England, Roger Pedrick and his wife Rebekah Holeman Pedrick, members of the Society of Friends, purchased 1,000 acres (400 ha) of land from John Fenwick, and shortly thereafter crossed the Atlantic to be in their new home. They originally settled in Chester, Pennsylvania, while their home was being built on their property on the other side of the Delaware. The minutes of the "Men's and Women's Friends Meeting" (a Quaker group) refer to the area as "Pedricks Neck" in the 1720s, and the birth records of many of Roger's and Rebekah's descendants list their birthplace as "Pedricksburg."

== Geography ==
According to the United States Census Bureau, Pedricktown had a total area of 0.905 square miles (2.345 km^{2}), including 0.903 square miles (2.340 km^{2}) of land and 0.002 square miles (0.005 km^{2}) of water (0.21%).

== Demographics ==
Historical population
Census	Pop.	Note	%±
2010	524		—
2020	487		−7.1%
U.S. Decennial Census; 2020

Pedricktown first appeared as a census designated place in the 2010 U.S. census.

=== 2020 census ===
Pedricktown CDP, New Jersey – Racial and ethnic composition Note: the US Census treats Hispanic/Latino as an ethnic category. This table excludes Latinos from the racial categories and assigns them to a separate category. Hispanics/Latinos may be of any race.
Race / Ethnicity (NH = Non-Hispanic)	Pop 2010	Pop 2020	% 2010	% 2020
White alone (NH)	452	422	86.26%	86.65%
Black or African American alone (NH)	13	13	2.48%	2.67%
Native American or Alaska Native alone (NH)	0	0	0.00%	0.00%
Asian alone (NH)	1	0	0.19%	0.00%
Native Hawaiian or Pacific Islander alone (NH)	0	0	0.00%	0.00%
Other race alone (NH)	2	1	0.38%	0.21%
Mixed race or Multiracial (NH)	4	19	0.76%	3.90%
Hispanic or Latino (any race)	52	32	9.92%	6.57%
Total	524	487	100.00%	100.00%

As of the 2020 United States census, the population was 487.

=== 2010 census ===
The 2010 United States census counted 524 people, 197 households, and 147 families in the CDP. The population density was 580.0 per square mile (223.9/km^{2}). There were 220 housing units at an average density of 243.5 per square mile (94.0/km^{2}). The racial makeup was 91.79% (481) White, 2.67% (14) Black or African American, 0.00% (0) Native American, 0.19% (1) Asian, 0.00% (0) Pacific Islander, 4.58% (24) from other races, and 0.76% (4) from two or more races. Hispanic or Latino people of any race were 9.92% (52) of the population.

Of the 197 households, 36.0% had children under the age of 18; 53.8% were married couples living together; 13.2% had a female householder with no husband present and 25.4% were non-families. Of all households, 20.3% were made up of individuals and 5.1% had someone living alone who was 65 years of age or older. The average household size was 2.66 and the average family size was 3.04.

26.9% of the population were under the age of 18, 6.7% from 18 to 24, 28.4% from 25 to 44, 27.5% from 45 to 64, and 10.5% who were 65 years of age or older. The median age was 36.0 years. For every 100 females, the population had 94.8 males. For every 100 females ages 18 and older there were 100.5 males.

== Economy ==
Goya Foods has its South Jersey division in Pedricktown.

Salem Oak Vineyards is a local winery.

== Transportation ==
Pedricktown is accessible at Exit 7 of Interstate 295 via County Route 643.

The Spitfire Aerodrome (FAA LID: 7N7) is a small municipal airport located in Pedricktown.
