= Oldmans Creek =

Tributary of the Delaware River in New Jersey

Coordinates: 39.683946°N 75.272503°W

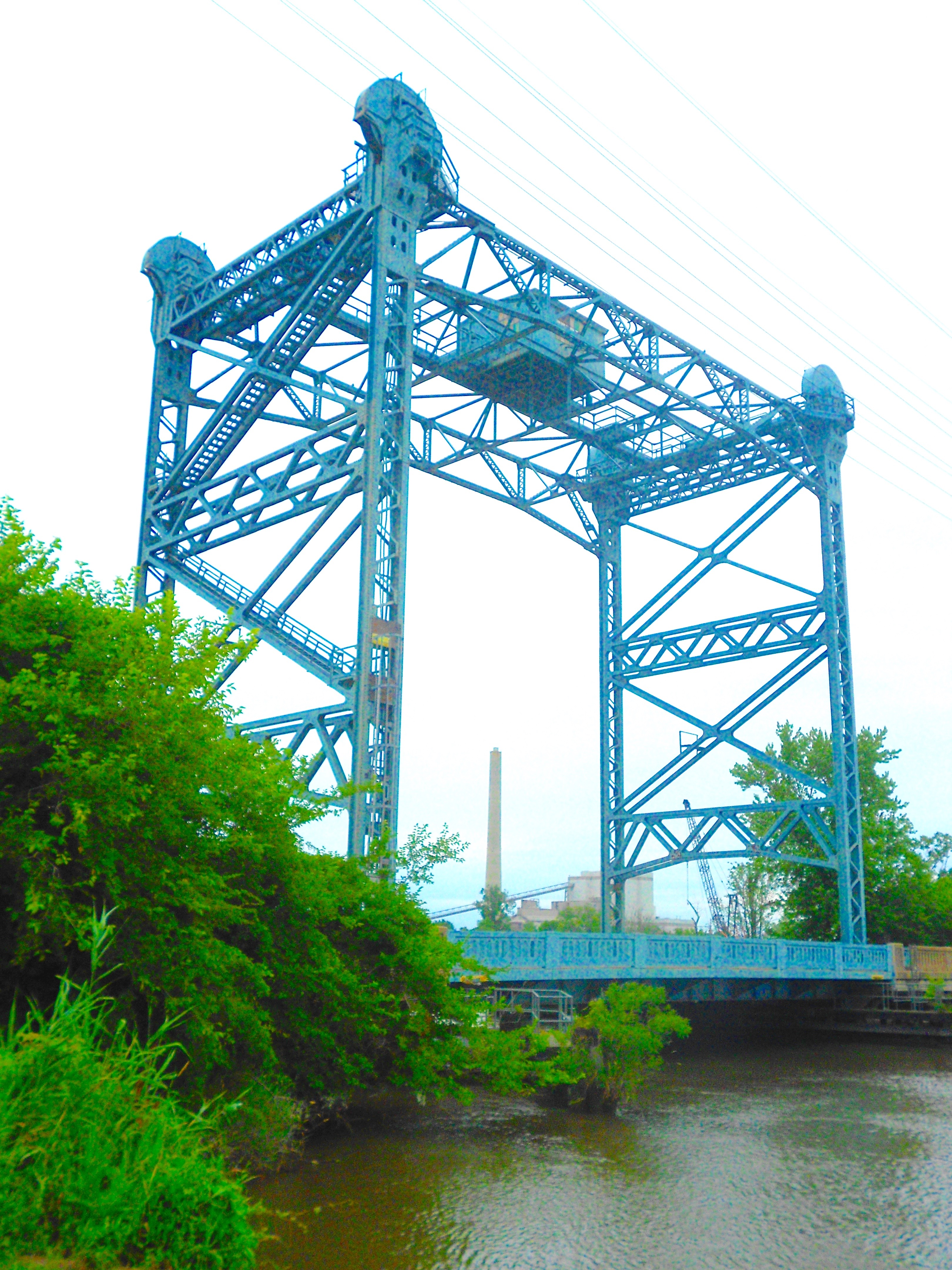
Bridge on US 130 over Oldmans Creek near Penns Grove

Oldmans Creek is a 22.1-mile-long (35.6 km) tributary of the Delaware River in southwestern New Jersey in the United States.

Oldmans Creek defines part of the western boundary between Gloucester and Salem counties. It starts just southwest of Glassboro, approximately one mile from the head of Raccoon Creek. It finishes in the lower Delaware River approximately four miles upstream from Penns Grove.

== See also ==
- List of rivers of New Jersey
