= Metcalf (surname) =

Metcalf (UK: /ˈmɛtkɑːf, -kəf/ MET-kahf, -kəf, US: /-kæf/ -kaf) is a surname of English origin.

== People with the surname "Metcalf" include ==
=== A ===
- Ami Metcalf (born 1994), English actress
- Arthur Metcalf (1889–1936), English footballer
- Artie L. Metcalf (1929–2016), American malacologist
- Arunah Metcalf (1771–1848), American politician

=== B ===
- Barbara D. Metcalf (born 1941), American historian
- Betsey Metcalf Baker (1786–1867; née Betsey Metcalf) American manufacturer of straw bonnets, entrepreneur, social activist
- Betty Metcalf (1921–2017), American politician
- Brandon Metcalf (born 1986), American record producer
- Brent Metcalf (born 1986), American wrestler
- Brian Metcalf, Korean-American filmmaker
- Bruce Metcalf (born 1949), American artist

=== C ===
- Charles D. Metcalf (1933–2021), American general
- Charlotte Metcalf (born 1958), British film director
- Chuck Metcalf (1931–2012), American bassist
- Clell Lee Metcalf (1888–1948), American entomologist
- Conger Metcalf (1914–1998), American painter

=== D ===
- Dick Metcalf, American journalist
- DK Metcalf (born 1997), American football player
- Donald Metcalf (1929–2014), Australian physiologist
- Douglas Metcalf, American clarinetist

=== E ===
- Elizabeth H. Metcalf (1852–1925), American anthropologist
- Eric Metcalf (born 1968), American football player

=== F ===
- Fred Metcalf (1899–1975), Australian rules footballer

=== G ===
- Gary Metcalf (born 1957), American organizational theorist
- George Metcalf (disambiguation), multiple people
- Gilbert E. Metcalf, American economist

=== H ===
- Harriet Metcalf (born 1958), American rower
- Helen Adelia Rowe Metcalf (1830–1895), American academic administrator
- Henry Metcalf (disambiguation), multiple people

=== I ===
- Ida Martha Metcalf (1857–1952), American mathematician

=== J ===
- Jack Metcalf (disambiguation), multiple people
- James Metcalf (1925–2012), American sculptor
- Janet Metcalf (1935–2025), American politician
- Janice Metcalf (born 1952), American tennis player
- Jesse H. Metcalf (1860–1942), American politician
- Jim Metcalf (1920–1977), American journalist
- Jim Metcalf (footballer) (1898–1975), English footballer
- JJ Metcalf (born 1988), British boxer
- Joanne Metcalf (born 1958), American composer
- Joel Hastings Metcalf (1866–1925), American astronomer
- John Metcalf (disambiguation), multiple people
- Jonathan Metcalf, American clerk
- Joseph Metcalf III (1927–2007), American admiral

=== K ===
- Keyes Metcalf (1889–1983), American librarian

=== L ===
- Laurie Metcalf (born 1955), American actress
- Lawrie Metcalf (1928–2017), New Zealand horticulturalist
- Lee Metcalf (1911–1978), American politician
- Louis Metcalf (1905–1981), American trumpeter
- Luke Metcalf (born 1999), Australian rugby league footballer

=== M ===
- Malcolm Metcalf (1910–1993), American athlete
- Mark Metcalf (born 1946), American actor
- Mark Metcalf (footballer) (born 1965), English footballer
- Matthew Metcalf (born 1969), English footballer
- Maynard Mayo Metcalf (1868–1940), American zoologist
- Michael Metcalf (1933–2018), British numismatist
- Michael Metcalf (puritan) (1586–1664), English colonist
- Mike Metcalf (1939–2018), English footballer
- Mitch Metcalf (born 1966), American television analyst

=== N ===
- Nancy Metcalf (born 1978), American volleyball player

=== P ===
- Paul Metcalf (1917–1999), American writer
- Peter Metcalf (born 1979), American ice hockey player
- Prescott Metcalf (1813–1891), American businessman and politician

=== R ===
- Ralph Metcalf (disambiguation), multiple people
- Robert Metcalf (disambiguation), multiple people
- Ryan Metcalf (born 1993), Scottish footballer

=== S ===
- Shelby Metcalf (1930–2007), American basketball coach
- Stephen Metcalf (disambiguation), multiple people
- Steve Metcalf, American lobbyist

=== T ===
- Terrence Metcalf (born 1978), American football player
- Terry Metcalf (born 1951), American football player
- Theophilus F. Metcalf (1816–1891), American farmer and politician
- Theron Metcalf (1784–1875), American attorney and politician
- Thomas Metcalf (disambiguation), multiple people
- Tim Metcalf, Australian poet
- TJ Metcalf (born 2005), American football player
- T. Nelson Metcalf (1890–1982), American football player
- Travis Metcalf (born 1982), American baseball player

=== V ===
- Victor H. Metcalf (1853–1936), American politician
- Victoria Metcalf, New Zealand researcher

=== W ===
- Walter Metcalf (chemist) (1918–2008), New Zealand physical chemist
- Walter Metcalf (footballer) (1910–1981), English footballer
- Wilder Metcalf (1855–1935), American politician
- Will Metcalf, American politician
- Willard Metcalf (1858–1925), American painter
- William Metcalf (disambiguation), multiple people
- Woodbridge Metcalf (1888–1972), American forester and sailor

=== Z ===
- Zeno Payne Metcalf (1885–1956), American entomologist

== Fictional characters ==
- Monk Metcalf, a character on the television series The Wire

== See also ==
- Metcalf (disambiguation), a disambiguation page for "Metcalf"
- Metcalfe (surname), a page for people with the surname "Metcalfe"
- Justice Metcalf (disambiguation), a disambiguation page for Justices surnamed "Metcalf"
- Senator Metcalf (disambiguation), a disambiguation page for Senators surnamed "Metcalf"
