= Metcalfe =

Metcalfe may refer to:

== Places ==
=== Australia ===
- Metcalfe, Victoria, a locality in Australia

=== Canada ===
- Metcalfe, Ontario, a Canadian community

=== United States ===
- Metcalfe, Georgia, a US town
- Metcalfe County, Kentucky
- Metcalfe, Mississippi, a US town

== Other uses ==
- Metcalfe (surname)
- Metcalfe's law, describes the relationship between the effects of a telecommunications network and the number of connected users
- Metcalfe Station (OC Transpo), a bus stop in Ottawa, Canada
- W. Metcalfe and Son, an English publishing company

== See also ==
- Metcalf (disambiguation)
- Metcalfe Street (disambiguation)
