= Stephen Medcalf =

Stephen Medcalf may refer to:

- Stephen Medcalf (academic) (1936–2007), British academic and scholar of classics and European literature
- Stephen Medcalf (director) (born 1958), British stage director

== See also ==
- Stephen Metcalf (disambiguation)
