= Harvey Snyder =

American football player and coach (1880–1937)

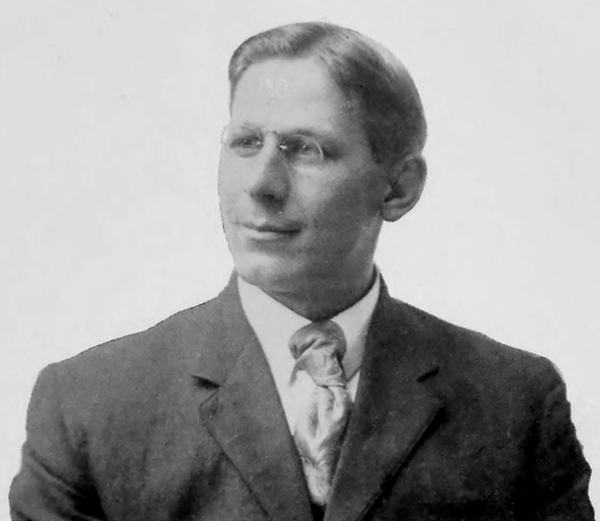
- In Oberlin Alumni Magazine in 1908

Biographical details
- Born: October 17, 1880; Mapleton, Ohio, U.S.
- Died: November 26, 1937 (aged 57); Lakewood, Ohio, U.S.
- Education: Harvard (1905); Harvard Law School (1908)

Playing career

Football
- 1905: Harvard

Basketball
- 1904–1905: Harvard

Coaching career (HC unless noted)

Football
- 1906–1910: Oberlin
- 1911–1913: Western Reserve

Head coaching record
- Overall: 33–22–11

Accomplishments and honors

Championships
- 2 OAC (1909–1910)

Harvey R. Snyder (October 17, 1880 – November 26, 1937) was an American college football player and coach.

== Early life and education ==
Snyder grew up in Stark County, Ohio, and attended Mount Union College as a preparatory school, before enrolling as a sophomore at Harvard University in 1902. He played both football and basketball at Harvard. During the 1904–05 basketball season, he led the team in scoring. He graduated with his bachelor's degree in 1905. Snyder then attended Harvard Law School, graduating in 1908. On May 20, 1910, Snyder married Mount Union alumna Charlotte Bracher in Alliance, Ohio, and together they had two children, Mary Katherine and Grace Olive.

== Coaching career ==
While in law school, Snyder returned to Ohio to coach Oberlin college football in 1906 and remained there for five seasons. Most notably, Snyder lead Oberlin to two Ohio Athletic Conference championships in 1909 and 1910. The Oberlin championship teams were led by star players T. Nelson Metcalf and Glen Gray.

In 1911, he moved on to the Western Reserve football team in nearby Cleveland, coaching for three seasons.

== Later years ==
Snyder left football in 1913 to focus on his law firm in Downtown Cleveland. Snyder was heavily involved in Freemasonry, where he was a found member of Lakewood, Ohio's Clifton Lodge #664. Snyder served as the Master in 1927. He was heavily involved with the Knights of Pythias, achieving the position of Grand Chancellor of Ohio in 1934.

Snyder died from bronchial pneumonia at his home in Lakewood, Ohio on November 26, 1937.

== Head coaching record ==
Year	Team	Overall	Conference	Standing	Bowl/playoffs
Oberlin Yeomen (Ohio Athletic Conference) (1906–1910)
1906	Oberlin	1–3–3	1–1–3	T–2nd	
1907	Oberlin	6–2	3–1	3rd	
1908	Oberlin	3–4	2–2	5th	
1909	Oberlin	5–1–1	4–0–1	1st	
1910	Oberlin	5–1–2	3–0–1	1st	
Oberlin:		20–11–6	13–4–5		
Western Reserve (Ohio Athletic Conference) (1911–1913)
1911	Western Reserve	4–3–4	1–3–2	7th	
1912	Western Reserve	5–4	4–1	3rd	
1913	Western Reserve	4–4–1	3–2–1	6th	
Western Reserve:		13–11–5	8–6–3		
Total:		33–22–11			
National championship Conference title Conference division title or championship game berth
