= Metcalfe (surname) =

Metcalfe (UK: /ˈmɛtkɑːf, -kəf/ MET-kahf, -kəf, US: /-kæf/ -kaf) is a surname, originating in Dentdale, Yorkshire, and is very common in places such as Wensleydale and Swaledale. It may refer to:

- Agnes Metcalfe, British headteacher and suffragist
- Andrew Metcalfe, former senior Australian public servant
- Ben Metcalfe, Canadian journalist and environmentalist
- Burt Metcalfe (1935–2022), Canadian-American film and television producer, director, screenwriter, and actor
- Charles Metcalfe, 1st Baron Metcalfe (1785–1846), British administrator in India
- Ciara Metcalfe, Irish cricketer
- Clive Metcalfe, British musician
- Daryl Metcalfe, Pennsylvania state representative
- Edward Metcalfe, British Benedictine monk
- Edward Dudley Metcalfe (1887–1957), friend and equerry of Edward VIII of the United Kingdom
- Edwin C. Metcalfe, American saxophonist and television station manager
- Frances Metcalfe Wolcott (1851–1933), American socialite and author
- Glenn Metcalfe, Scottish rugby player
- James Stetson Metcalfe (1858–1927), American critic and author
- Jane Metcalfe, American magazine publisher
- Jean Metcalfe (1923–2000), British broadcaster
- Jennifer Metcalfe (born 1983), British actress
- Jesse Metcalfe, American actor
- Joanne Metcalfe (born 1969), Australian basketball player
- John Metcalfe (composer), British violist and composer
- John Metcalfe (writer), British science fiction and horror writer
- John William Metcalfe (1872–1952), British reverend and entomologist
- Jordan Metcalfe, British actor
- Kelly Metcalfe, Canadian scientist and professor
- Percy Metcalfe, British artist
- Peter Metcalfe (1931–2016), England rugby league footballer
- Philip Metcalfe, English distiller and MP
- Ralph Metcalfe (1910–1978), American athlete and politician
- Richard Metcalfe, Scottish rugby player
- Richard Lee Metcalfe, Governor of Panama Canal Zone
- Robert Metcalfe (disambiguation), several people
- Rowan Metcalfe (1955–2003), New Zealand novelist, short-story writer, poet, editor, and journalist
- Simon Metcalfe (1735–1794), American maritime fur trader
- Theophilus Metcalfe (1610–c.1645), English stenographer
- Thomas Metcalfe (disambiguation), several people
- Sir Thomas Theophilus Metcalfe, 4th Baronet, Honourable East India Company servant
- Vic Metcalfe, English professional footballer.
- Wendy Metcalfe, Canadian journalist, editor, and news executive
- William Metcalfe (1788–1862), English-American minister, physician, and activist

== See also ==
- Metcalf (surname)
