= Senator Metcalf =

Senator Metcalf or Metcalfe may refer to:

== Members of the United States Senate ==
- Jesse H. Metcalf (1860–1942), U.S. Senator from Rhode Island from 1924 to 1937
- Lee Metcalf (1911–1978), U.S. Senator from Montana from 1961 to 1978
- Thomas Metcalfe (Kentucky politician) (1780–1855), U.S. Senator from Kentucky from 1848 to 1849

== United States state senate members ==
- Barry Metcalf (politician) (born 1959), Kentucky State Senate
- George R. Metcalf (1914–2002), New York State Senate
- Henry B. Metcalf (1829–1904), Rhode Island State Senate
- Jack Metcalf (1927–2007), Washington State Senate
- Ralph Metcalf (Washington politician) (1861–1939), Washington State Senate
- Steve Metcalf (fl. 1990s–2000s) North Carolina State Senate
- Wilder Metcalf (1855–1935), Kansas State Senate
