= Oberlin Yeomen football =

US collegiate football program

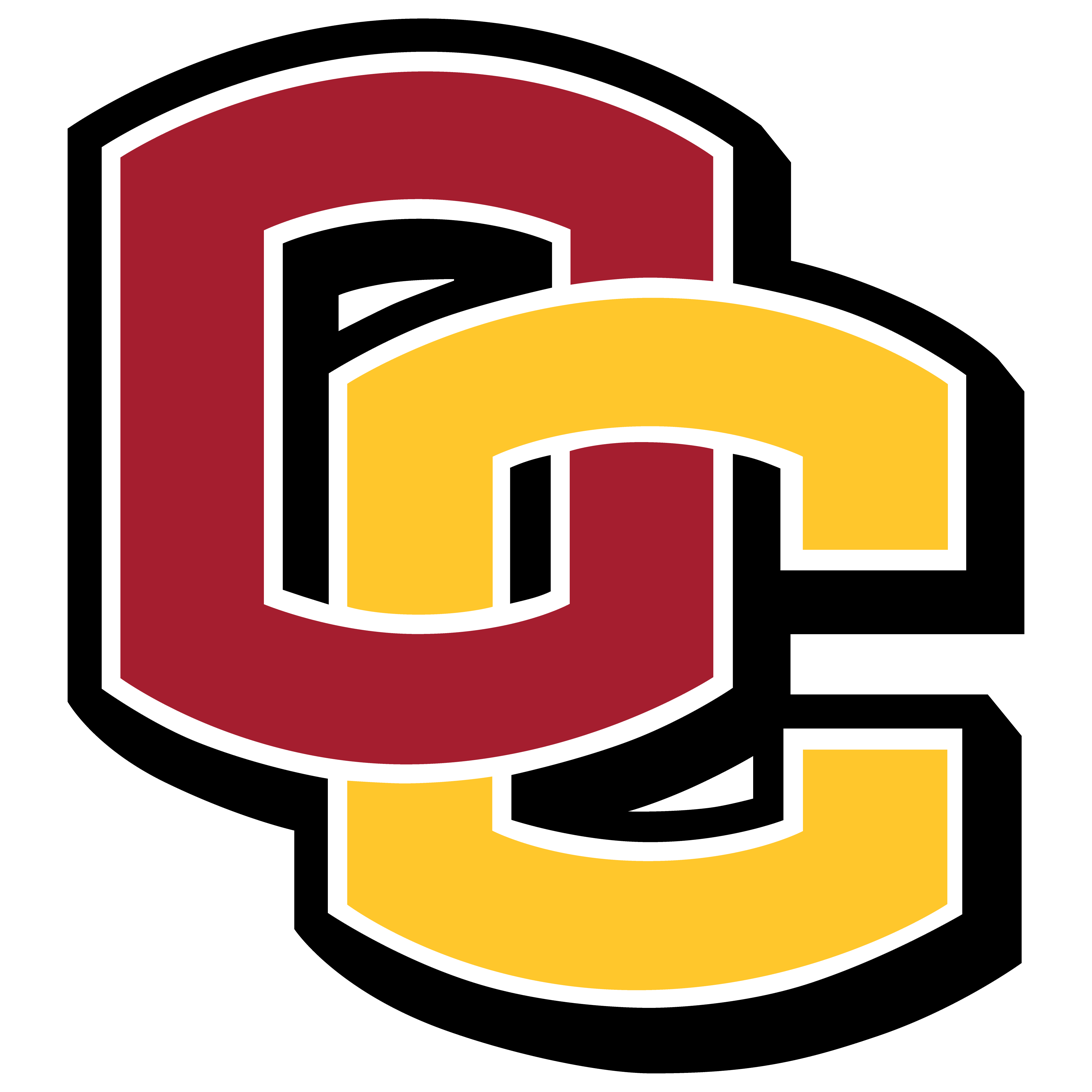
- First season: 1891; 135 years ago
- Athletic director: Natalie Wilkelfoos
- Head coach: John Pont; 3rd season, 2–18 (.100)
- Location: Oberlin, Ohio
- Stadium: Dick Bailey Field (capacity: 3,050)
- NCAA division: Division III
- Conference: NCAC
- Colors: Crimson and Gold
- All-time record: 402–627–3 (.391)
- Fight song: "Oberlin, Our Alma Mater" aka "Ten Thousand Strong"
- Outfitter: Nike
- Website: goyeo.com/football

The Oberlin Yeomen football program represents Oberlin College in college football at the NCAA Division III level. The program is known for having begun the coaching career of player and coach John Heisman, being the last in-state team to defeat Ohio State, and for having one of the worst records in college football history from 1990 to 2001.

After initially helping form the Ohio Athletic Conference in 1902, Oberlin is now part of the North Coast Athletic Conference (NCAC), of which it is a founding member. The college plays its home games in the Austin E. Knowlton Athletics Complex, built in 2014.

The name Yeomen arose in the early 1900s as a result of blending the former team moniker with the schools official motto. Early on in the program, football players and other athletes were known simply as Oberlin Men or "O" Men. Eventually, as the athletic department became more cohesive, the Yeomen mascot was adopted, drawing on the phonetic sound of "O" Men and the schools official motto of "Learning and Labor".

== History ==
=== John Heisman ===
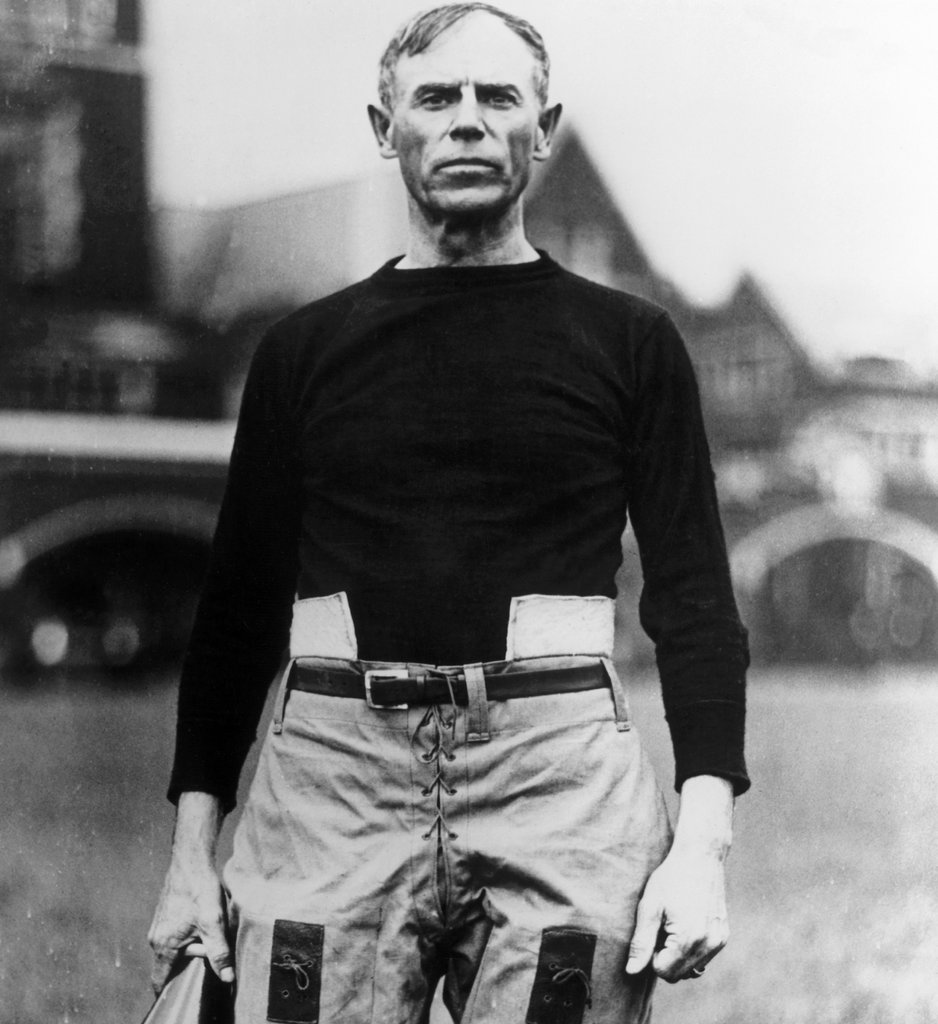
Legendary coach John Heisman got his start at Oberlin

Oberlin was the first school coached by the legendary John Heisman. He coached the teams in 1892 and 1894, the second and fourth seasons that football was a varsity sport at the college. The faculty had not approved football as a sport prior to 1891, but it agreed to hire Heisman as head coach for the 1892 season because he was recommended by Walter Camp. Heisman was a graduate of the University of Pennsylvania where he starred as an end in football. In those days football was quite popular in the East and was just beginning to take root in the Midwest. The hiring of Heisman enabled Oberlin to become one of the leading team's in the Midwest. In 1892 the "O" Men, as they were called at the time, were led by Heisman to their first undefeated season with a perfect 7–0 record, beating their opponents by an average score of 37-4 which included two wins over Ohio State and one over Michigan. To this day, the Wolverines still claim they won the contest but all agree that both sides played the game as it should have been played (without any slugging.) Because Heisman enrolled in post graduate courses in art, he was permitted to play football for Oberlin as he participated in the late stages of some games near the end of the season. Heisman became known as the leading pioneer in developing the game of football into what it is today with formation shifts, centering the ball, and forward passing. His contribution to Oberlin was in proving that an intelligent coach was an integral part of the sport. The Heisman name is more famous today than back in 1892, being synonymous with the award for most outstanding player in college football. As a result, Oberlin named their athletics booster club after Heisman, in an attempt encourage support for all of Oberlin's athletic programs.

==== Controversial game vs. Michigan ====
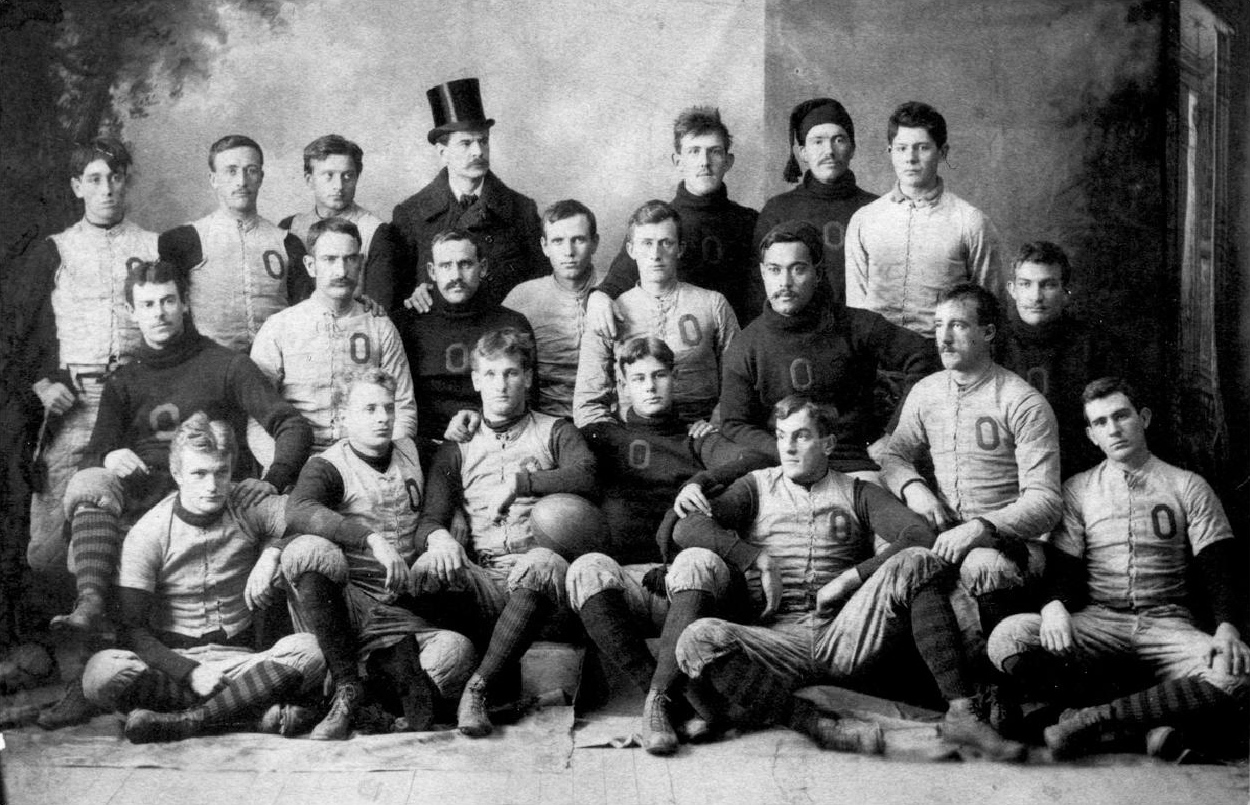
Oberlin College football team, 1892

On a cold Saturday afternoon in November 1892, Oberlin's team took the field in Ann Arbor against a heavily favored Michigan squad which had trounced them handily the year before. Notable among the Oberlin visitors was their new player-coach John Heisman, who had been hired away from the University of Pennsylvania by the Oberlin Athletic Association (a student-run enterprise in those days) and who brought an undefeated team with him to Ann Arbor. The team's fastest running back was Charles Savage, who a few years later would become Oberlin's director of athletics and, like Heisman, a nationally prominent figure. Oberlin's best lineman was theology student John Henry Wise, half-German, half-Hawaiian, who after graduation returned to his island home and joined the 1895 Counter-Revolution aimed at toppling the Republic of Hawaii and restoring Queen Liliuokalani and the monarchy. Oberlin's team trainer, "nurse to the wounded," was pre-med student Clarence Hemingway, who would go on to practice medicine in Oak Park, Illinois, and pass on his love of hunting in Michigan to his son, future novelist Ernest Hemingway.

The game in Ann Arbor was close all the way. At halftime Michigan led 22–18. The team captains agreed on a shortened second half, to end at 4:50 p.m. so Oberlin could catch the last train home. With less than two minutes remaining, Michigan drove to the 5-yard line before Oberlin stopped them and took over on downs. Then halfback Savage entered the mists of Oberlin athletic legend by dodging through the line and sprinting 90 yards to the Michigan 5, where Michigan's star player, George Jewett, caught him from behind.

Two plays later Oberlin made its final touchdown. Score: Oberlin 24, Michigan 22, with less than a minute to go. As Michigan launched its last drive, the referee (an Oberlin sub) announced that 4:50 p.m. had arrived, time had expired, and the Oberlin squad trotted off the field to catch the train. Next the umpire (a Michigan man) ruled that four minutes remained on the game clock, owing to timeouts that Oberlin's timekeeper had not recorded. Michigan then walked the ball over the goal line for an uncontested touchdown and was declared the winner, 26 to 24. By that time the Oberlinians were headed home clutching their own victory, 24 to 22. Officially, each school recognizes a win for themselves in the respective archives.

=== 1895–1929 ===
During the early part of the 20th century, Oberlin enjoyed a wide range of success. They regularly competed with, and beat, teams like Michigan and Ohio State and rarely experienced a season with a losing record. Oberlin is a charter member of the NCAA and was one of the founding members of the Ohio Athletic Conference in 1902, along with Western Reserve University, Kenyon College, Ohio State University, Ohio Wesleyan University and Case School of Applied Science. The league commonly was known as the "Big Six." Ohio State left the league to join the Big Ten in 1913, signifying the widening athletic distance between liberal arts schools like Oberlin and major universities. Ohio State's all-time highest margin of victory was a 128–0 thrashing of Oberlin in 1916, however Oberlin is also the last in-state school to defeat Ohio State. The Yeomen upset the Buckeyes 7–6 at Ohio Field in Columbus in 1921.

=== 1930–1989 ===
Since 1929, Oberlin has been unable to duplicate the success of its early years in college football. As a result of The Great Depression and World War II many young men were enlisting in the armed forces instead of attending college and playing football. The college, as a private institution, began focusing on the liberal arts aspect of Oberlin's education, forgoing aggressive expansion like former rivals Michigan and Ohio State. During these years Oberlin experienced up and down seasons, though they would lose more often than win. In 1945 Oberlin was undefeated.

In 1985 Oberlin helped found the North Coast Athletic Conference, based on the principle of gender equality in athletics. The conference currently recognizes 22 varsity sports, 11 men's and 11 women's, and is well respected for the academic strength of its member institutions.

=== 1990–2001 ===
From 1990 through 2001 the Oberlin College football team lost more games than any other team in college football, winning only 4 games and nursing two separate streaks of 40 or more losses. The teams of 1994 to 2000 have been rated the fifth worst college football team of all time by ESPN.com's Page 2. After losing 56–0 to Allegheny in one 1992 game, the Yeoman had so few players they had to forfeit their next game against Wittenberg- and the forfeit turned out to be one of their finest outings. "Nobody got hurt," one school official told Sports Illustrated. "And a forfeit shows up as a 6-0 loss in the books, which was better than most of our scores." In 1994, Oberlin lost all nine games of its season scoring only ten points and giving up 358 points. In 1995, the Yeomen were outscored 469 to 72. In August 1996, Sports Illustrated featured Oberlin in its annual College Football Preview as the worst team in Division III. After four winless seasons from 1993 to 1996, Oberlin opened its 1997 season with an 18–17 victory over Thiel College. Quarterback James Parker threw a touchdown pass to freshman wide receiver John Singleton Jr. in the middle of the endzone. The next play, Parker then threw the game winning pass to John Singleton Jr. to complete the two point conversion to put Oberlin up 18-17 for the win. This win sparked a post-game jubilation with fans rushing the field. The victory garnered national attention as ESPN featured it on SportsCenter. Oberlin would not win another game for almost four years. Swarthmore College and Oberlin scheduled a 1999 matchup, with both schools nursing long losing streaks, just so one of them could end their streak. Oberlin lost 42–6 and continued a 44-game losing streak, ending it with a 53–22 victory over Kenyon College at home in October 2001.

=== 2002–2013 ===
Since the 2002 season, Oberlin has recovered from its years of college football futility. Aided in part by consistent coaching, and improvements to the athletic facilities under the guidance of the administration. Though the program has yet to post consistent winning seasons, they have remained competitive in the NCAC, going 5–5 (with better than .500 records in conference) in 2003, 2006, and 2007.

2007 may have been the most successful season in the early 2000s. The team went 5–5 overall and finished third in the North Coast Athletic Conference, breaking multiple offensive team records along the way. The group was also successful as individuals. Of the players on the 2007 roster, 6 hold multiple school records, 16 made the All-NCAC team, and 2 were named All-Americans. The 2007 squad boasts the school's all-time passer, receiver, kick-returner, rusher, and all-time leading scorer. Chris Schubert and Chris Pisani, seniors on the 2007 squad, each sustained professional football careers in the AFL.

On November 16, 2013, Oberlin broke ground on the new Austin E. Knowlton Athletics Complex while playing its final game at Savage Stadium. Less than a month later, on December 6, 2013, it was announced that head coach Jeff Ramsey would be leaving the program. Ramsey had just completed his 15th season at Oberlin in which the Yeomen, whose roster consisted of just 35 players, finished 3-7 overall and 2–7 in the North Coast Athletic Conference (NCAC). During his time with the program, Ramsey mentored 5 All-Americans, 96 All-NCAC athletes, 2 conference players of the year, and 2 conference newcomers of the year.

=== 2014–present ===
In February 2014 it was announced that interim head coach Jay Anderson would take over for Ramsey. A 2003 University of Toledo Graduate and member of the 2001 Rockets team that won the MAC championship, Anderson had previously served as the team's defensive coordinator and defensive backs coach.

The beginning of the 2014 season also saw the dedication of the Austin E. Knowlton Athletics Complex and Dick Bailey Field, which replaced the outdated Savage Football Stadium and features an all-weather, multipurpose field with artificial turf and lights, suitable for multi-sport use. It serves as the home for the Yeomen football team, field hockey team, and men's and women's lacrosse teams. The complex includes a state-of-the-art press box, grandstands for home and visiting spectators, a support facility with home and visitor locker rooms, and innovative meeting and social spaces for the campus community. The complex is the result of an $8 million gift from the Austin E. Knowlton Foundation that supports college and universities in the Midwest.

Steve Opgenorth took over as head coach of the program in 2020. Opgenorth played football at NCAA Division II Winona State prior to a coaching career that included several stops in DII and DIII ranks prior to Oberlin. Opgenorth will coach his first games for Oberlin in 2021 due to the COVID-19 pandemic.

In 2020 Steve Opgenorth announced the hiring of Alex Hanna to the position of Assistant Conerbacks Coach and Director of Football Operations. Hanna is believed to be the first woman to coach the Oberlin Football team and one of a handful of women coaching men's college football as of 2021. Hanna had previously held football related positions with the University of Delaware and the Cleveland Browns.

== Rivalries ==
=== Ohio State ===
Oberlin is a former rival of Ohio State, both having been members of the Ohio Athletic Conference. The two first played in 1892 and would compete 26 times over the next 30 seasons before Ohio State outpaced Oberlin's growth and left them behind to join the Big Ten. While it lasted, the rivalry was fairly even as Oberlin posted a 10-13-3 record against the Buckeyes including blowout wins of 50-0 and 40–0 and 128-0. Before the turn of the 20th century, Ohio State and Oberlin were comparative in size, but by 1921, Ohio State's enrollment grew to over four times the size of Oberlin's student body.

As the gap in class sizes began to grow wider, so did the talent on the gridiron. In the three previous meetings prior to 1921, Ohio State scored a total of 211 points against Oberlin, while the Yeomen failed to score a single point against the Buckeyes.

In 1921, the teams met again as Ohio State came off a Rose Bowl appearance and a conference championship the previous year. The Buckeyes gained the lead in the first five minutes of the game after they scooped up a blocked Yeomen punt and scored. The Buckeye score would be the last time Ohio State crossed Oberlin's goal line.

In the third quarter, the Yeomen put together an 85-yard drive that ended with a touchdown. Oberlin's kicker completed the point after, which proved to be all the lead the Yeomen would need to seal the victory. This remains the last time another team from within Ohio has beaten Ohio State.

=== The Five Colleges and Case Western Reserve ===
Oberlin has been part of traditional rivalries with several other liberal arts colleges in Ohio. These include the four other Five Colleges of Ohio: Denison, Wooster, Kenyon, and Ohio Wesleyan; as well as local rival Case Western Reserve. For years the schools played each other as part of the Ohio Athletic Conference until the NCAC was formed in 1985 and Case left to join the University Athletic Association.

=== Kenyon ===
Kenyon has traditionally been Oberlin's biggest rival. The rivalry, which began over 100 years ago, stems from the school's many similarities, most notably the level of academic prestige. Though all of the schools in the North Coast Athletic Conference are known for their academic standards, Kenyon and Oberlin are consistently recognized as the top two academic schools in the conference and top 25 in the country. This, among other similarities, often leads to competitive recruiting of the same high school student-athletes. The rivalry on the field has been just as competitive. Oberlin faced off against Kenyon for the first time in 1892, winning 38–0, and has posted a record of 40-38-6 against the Lords.

== Head coaching history ==
Coach	Tenure	Seasons	Won	Lost	Tied	Perc.
Bert M. Hogen	1891	1	2	2	0	.500
John Heisman	1892, 1894	2	11	2	1	.767
Everett B. Camp	1893	1	6	1	0	.857
William M. Richards	1895	1	4	1	1	.750
C. K. Fauver	1896	1	5	3	1	.611
Samuel Huston Thompson	1897	1	5	1	1	.688
Edwin Stearns	1898–1899	2	10	6	0	.625
Edgar Fauver	1900–1902	3	16	9	0	.640
Edwin Fauver	1903–1904	2	8	6	2	.563
Richard M. Jones	1905	1	3	6	0	.333
Harvey Snyder	1906–1910	5	20	11	6	.622
Glen Gray	1911–1912	2	13	2	1	.844
T. Nelson Metcalf	1913, 1919–1921	4	25	5	1	.823
A. Judson Pyle	1914	1	4	4	0	.500
Frank Cary	1915	1	4	4	0	.500
Paul Des Jardien	1916	1	0	7	0	.000
Jacob Speelman	1917–1918	2	6	6	1	.500
Udell H. Stallings & Lawrence McPhee	1922–1923	2	10	4	1	.700
William L. Hughes	1924	1	8	0	0	1.000
Paul N. MacEachron	1925–1929	5	28	10	2	.725
Lysle K. Butler	1930–1957	28	83	120	17	.416
J. William Grice	1958–1972	15	36	77	2	.322
Cass Jackson	1973–1974	2	9	9	0	.500
Richard Riendeau	1975–1977	3	6	17	0	.261
Don Hunsinger	1978–1989	12	27	87	0	.237
Larry Story	1990–1991	2	1	18	0	.053
Tony Pierce	1992–1993	2	1	19	0	.050
Pete Peterson	1994–1998	5	1	48	0	.020
Jeff Ramsey	1999–2013	15	42	108	0	.280
Jay Anderson	2014–2019	6	12	48	0	.200
Steve Opgenorth	2020–2022	3	1	13	0	.071
John Pont	2023–present	2	2	18	0	.100

== Individual awards and honors ==
=== All-Americans ===
Player	Year	Position	Selectors
J. Barton Harrison	1950	End	Associated Press
Ron Stevenson	1982	RB	Associated Press
Bob Nau	1984	LB	Pizza Hut
Frank DeSmit	1985	WR	Associated Press
Keith LaDu	1985; 1986; 1987	LB	Pizza Hut; Pizza Hut; Pizza Hut, Football News
Sam Hobi	2001	LB	Verizon Academic, D3Football.com
Quammie Semper	2003	CB	D3Football.com, Don Hanson's Football Gazette
Chase Palmer	2006	DB	Don Hanson's Football Gazette
R.V. Carroll	2006	RB	Don Hanson's Football Gazette
Clay Eaton	2011; 2012	DE	Beyond College Sports Network; Beyond College Sports Network, AFCA, D3football.com

=== North Coast Athletic Conference honors ===
==== Newcomer Of The Year ====
Sam Hobi, 2000
Ricky Valenzuela, 2001

==== NCAC Offensive Player Of The Year ====
R.V. Carroll, 2007

==== NCAC Defensive Player Of The Year ====
Clay Eaton, 2012

==== NCAC Special Teams Player of the Year ====
Bryant Walker, 2017

== Individual school records ==
=== Offense ===
==== Rushing records ====
- Most rushing attempts, career: 865, Ron Stevenson (1979–82)
- Most rushing attempts, season: 317, Ron Stevenson (1981)
- Most rushing attempts, game: 46, Ron Stevenson (1981 vs. Grove City)
- Most rushing yards, career: 2,505, R.V. Carroll (2005–08)
- Most rushing yards, season: 1,280, R.V. Carroll (2007)
- Most rushing yards, game: 336, R.V. Carroll (2006 vs. Kenyon)
- Most rushing touchdowns, career: 39, R.V. Carroll (2005–08)
- Most rushing touchdowns, season: 16, R.V. Carroll (2007)
- Most rushing touchdowns, game: 5, R.V. Carroll (2006 vs. Kenyon)
- Longest run from scrimmage: 94 yards, Fred Cummings (1987 vs. Kenyon)

==== Passing records ====
- Most passing attempts, career: 1,134, James Parker (1994–97)
- Most passing attempts, season: 413, James Parker (1997)
- Most passing attempts, game: 63, Josh Mandel (2011 vs. Washington University)
- Most passing completions, career: 591, Greg Mangan (2005–08)
- Most passing completions, season: 230, James Parker (1997)
- Most passing completions, game: 40, James Parker (1997 vs. Kenyon)
- Most passing yards, career: 7,002, Greg Mangan (2005–08)
- Most passing yards, season: 2,404, Greg Mangan (2006)
- Most passing yards, game: 506, Lucas Poggiali (2015 vs. Allegheny)
- Most passing touchdowns, career: 48, Greg Mangan (2005–08)
- Most passing touchdowns, season: 20, Josh Mandel (2011)
- Most passing touchdowns, game: 6, Willie Martinez (1974 vs. Chicago)
- Longest pass completion: 89yds, Josh Mandel (2012 vs. Denison)
- Highest completion percentage, career: .633, Greg Mangan (2005–08)
- Highest completion percentage, season: .674, Greg Mangan (2006)
- Highest completion percentage, game: .888, Kevney O’Connor (1949 vs. Kenyon)

==== Receiving records ====
- Most receptions, career: 214, Felix Brooks-Church (1995–98)
- Most receptions, season: 78, Anthony Johnson (1997)
- Most receptions, game: 17, Felix Brooks-Church (1996 vs. Allegheny)
- Most receiving yards, career: 2,536, Chris Schubert (2004–07)
- Most receiving yards, season: 990, Ricky Valenzuela (2001)
- Most receiving yards, game: 242, Justin Cruz (2014 vs. Allegheny)
- Most touchdown receptions, career: 23, Chris Schubert (2004–07)
- Most touchdown receptions, season: 11, Justin Cruz (2014)
- Most touchdown receptions, game: 4, Jay Greeley (1974 vs. Chicago)
- Longest pass reception: 89yds, Robin Witjes (2012 vs. Denison)

==== Scoring ====
- Most points, career: 250, R.V Carroll (2005–08)
- Most points, season: 98, R.V. Carroll (2007)
- Most points, game: 30, R.V. Carroll (2006 vs. Kenyon)
- Most touchdowns, career: 40, R.V. Carroll (2005–2008)
- Most touchdowns, season: 16, R.V. Carroll (2007)
- Most touchdowns, game: 5, R.V. Carroll (2006 vs. Kenyon)
- Most PATs, career: 92, Zach Richard (2007–10)
- Most PATs, season: 36, Zach Richard (2007)
- Most PATs, game: 9, Zach Richard (2007 vs. Kenyon)
- Most field goals, career: 19, Erickson Andrews (2011–14)
- Most field goals, season: 11, Steve Willever (2002)
- Most field goals, game: 4, Erickson Andrews (2012 vs. Earlham)
- Longest field goal, 56yds,___Michael__ ____Tomlinson__(1994 vs. Macalester)

==== Returns ====
- Most kickoff returns, game: 9, Jon Davies (Baldwin-Wallace, 1968)
- Most kickoff returns, season: 49, Chris Schubert (2007)
- Most kickoff returns, career: 122, Chris Schubert (2004–07)
- Most kickoff return yards, game: 250, Malik Cavallo (1993 vs. Wittenberg)
- Most kickoff return yards, season: 1,056, Chris Schubert (2007)
- Most kickoff return yards, career: 2,867, Chris Schubert (2004–07)
- Most punt returns, game: 9, David Kalgren (2012 vs. Earlham)
- Most punt returns, season: 22, Chris Schubert (2007)
- Most punt returns, career: 69, Chris Schubert (2004–07)
- Most punt return yards, game: 95, Jon Davies (1969 vs. Kenyon)
- Most punt return yards, season: 180, Chris Schubert (2005)
- Most punt return yards, career: 343, Chris Schubert (2004–07)

=== Defense ===
- Most tackles, game: 31, Keith LaDu (1985 vs. Marietta)
- Most tackles, season: 201, Keith LaDu (1986)
- Most tackles, career: 712, Keith LaDu (1984–87)
- Most tackles for loss, game: 8, Jon Ramsier (2003 vs. F&M)
- Most tackles for loss, season: 24, Sam Hobi (2000)
- Most tackles for loss, career: 48.5, Clay Eaton (2009–12)
- Most interceptions, game: 1. 3, George Parr (2000 vs. Hiram)
- Most interceptions, season: 10, Quammie Semper (2003)
- Most interceptions, career: 21, Quammie Semper (2000–03)
- Most interception yards, game: 110, Quammie Semper (2003 vs. Earlham)
- Most interception yards, season: 168, Quammie Semper (2003)
- Most interception yards, career: 425, Quammie Semper (2000–03)
- Most sacks, game: 5, Sam Hobi (2001 vs. Denison)
- Most sacks, season: 13.5, Chris Pisani (2005)
- Most sacks, career: 24.5, Clay Eaton (2009–12)
- Average yards per punt, game: 52.9, Bryant Walker (2017 vs. Wabash)
- Average yards per punt, season: 40.6, Cory Kidd (2010)
- Average yards per punt, career: 38.7, Chase Palmer (2006–07)

== Related books ==
Oberlin history: essays and impressions, Geoffrey Blodgett, Kent State University Press, 2006
When Oberlin Was King of the Gridiron: The Heisman Years, Nat Brandt, Kent State University Press, 2001
