= Ralph Metcalf =

Ralph Metcalf may refer to:

- Ralph Metcalf (New Hampshire politician) (1796–1858), American lawyer and politician from New Hampshire
- Ralph Metcalf (North Dakota politician) (1935–2026), American politician, member of the North Dakota House of Representatives
- Ralph Metcalf (Washington politician) (1861–1939), American politician in the state of Washington

== See also ==
- Ralph Metcalfe (1910–1978), American Olympic sprinter and U.S. Representative from Illinois
