= Fred W. Hastings =

American politician

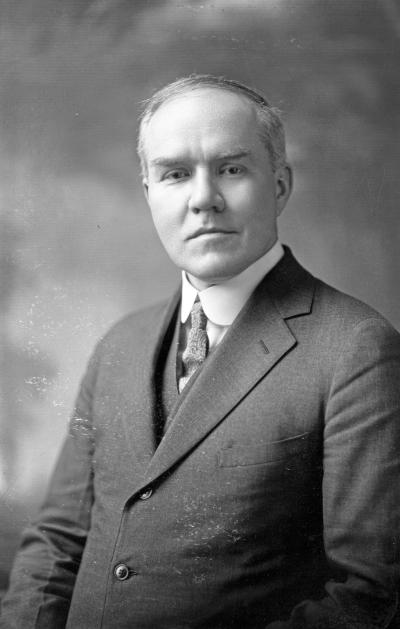
- Hastings in 1925

President pro tempore of the Washington Senate
- In office January 14, 1929 – January 12, 1931
- Preceded by: Ralph Metcalf
- Succeeded by: W. J. Sutton

Member of the Washington State Senate for the 36th district
- In office 1919–1933

Member of the Washington House of Representatives for the 46th district
- In office 1911–1919

Personal details
- Born: October 18, 1882 Ohio, U.S.
- Died: December 18, 1932 (aged 50) Seattle, Washington, U.S.
- Party: Republican

Fred W. Hastings (October 18, 1882 – December 18, 1932) was an American politician in the state of Washington. He served in the Washington State Senate and Washington House of Representatives. From 1929 to 1931, he was President pro tempore of the Senate. He died in 1932.
