= Metcalfe Street =

Metcalfe Street may refer to:

- Metcalfe Street (Ottawa)
- Metcalfe Street (Montreal)

== See also ==
- Metcalfe (disambiguation)
