= Penn's Neck Township, New Jersey =

Former township in Salem County, New Jersey

Coordinates: 39.717°N 75.440°W

Penn's Neck Township was a township that existed in Salem County, New Jersey, United States, from 1701 until 1721.

Penn's Neck Township was first mentioned on May 12, 1701. It had originally existed as West Fenwick Township, which was first mentioned in a deed on August 30, 1676, though the details of its incorporation are unknown.

The township was subdivided and dissolved as of July 10, 1721, with the formation of Upper Penns Neck Township (now Carneys Point Township) and Lower Penns Neck Township (now Pennsville Township).
