= John Metcalfe =

John Metcalfe may refer to:

- John Metcalfe (composer), British-based composer and violist
- John Metcalfe (writer) (1891–1965), British science fiction and horror writer
- Jack Metcalfe (1912–1994), Australian athlete
- John Metcalfe (footballer) (1935–1996), English professional footballer
- John Metcalfe (librarian) (1901–1982), Australian librarian
- John Francis Metcalfe (1908–1975), British Army general

== See also ==
- John Metcalf (disambiguation)
