= Metcalf =

Metcalf may refer to:

== People and fictional characters ==
- Metcalf (surname)

== Places in the United States ==
- Metcalf, Illinois, a village
- Metcalf, Holliston, Massachusetts, a district of Holliston
- Metcalf Hill, New York, a mountain

== Other uses ==
- USS Metcalf (DD-595), a US Navy destroyer
- Metcalf Center for Science and Engineering, a building at Boston University in Massachusetts
- Metcalf (dinghy), an American sailboat design
- Metcalf transmission substation, site of the 2013 Metcalf sniper attack which damaged electrical transformers, near San Jose, California
- Metcalf, a fictional town in Alfred Hitchcock's film Strangers on a Train

== See also ==
- Metcalf Chateau, a group of Asian-American artists with ties to Honolulu
- Metcalfe (disambiguation)
