= Carneys Point Township, New Jersey =

Township in Salem County, New Jersey, US

- Township
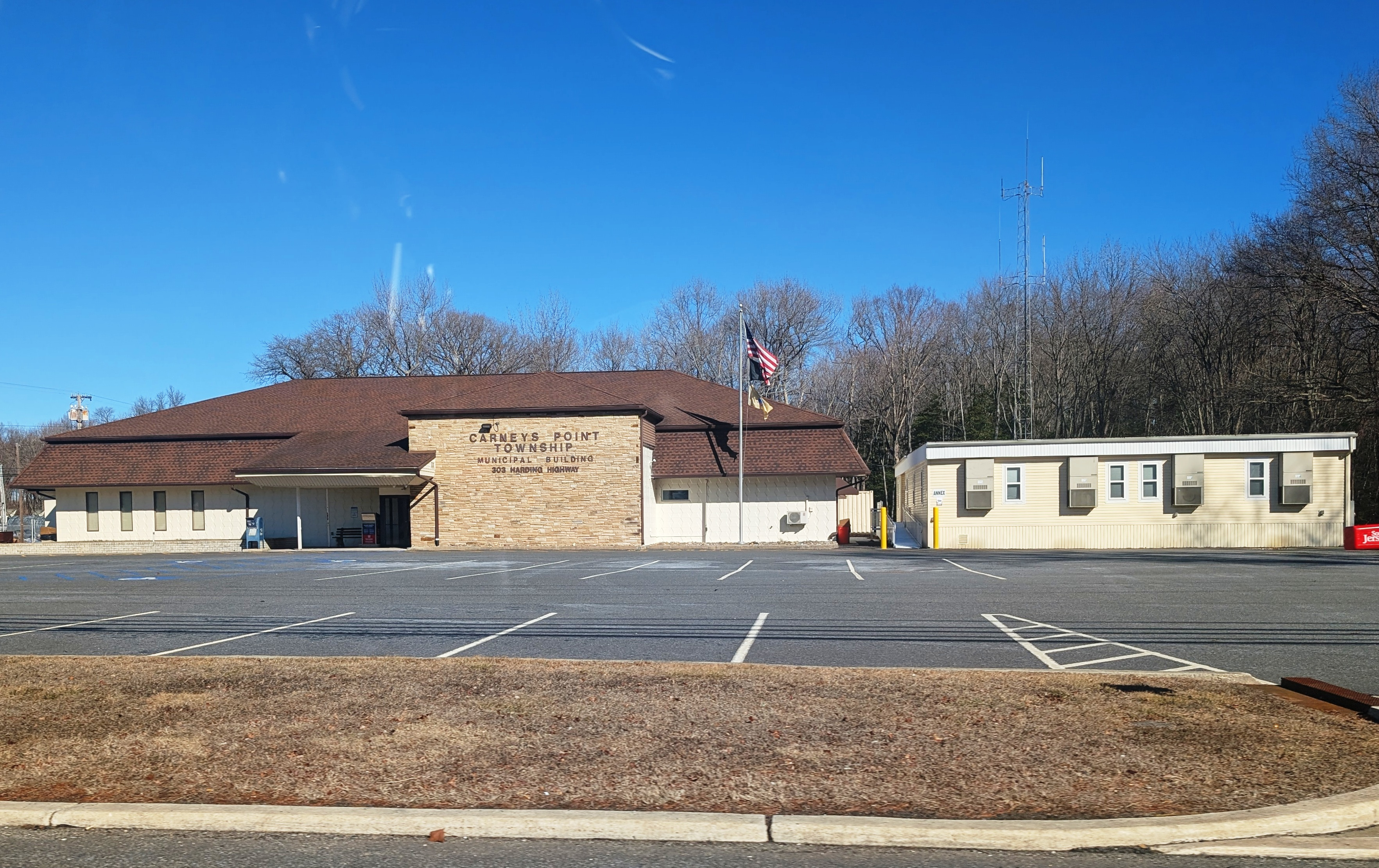
- Carneys Point Township Municipal Building

- Wordmark

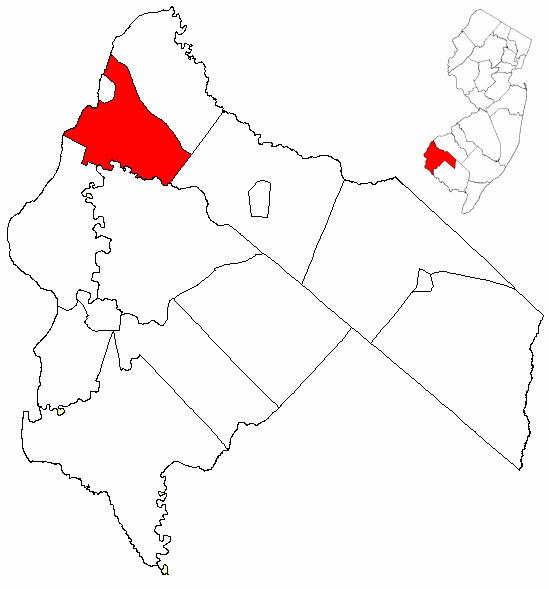
- Carneys Point Township highlighted in Salem County. Inset map: Salem County highlighted in the State of New Jersey.

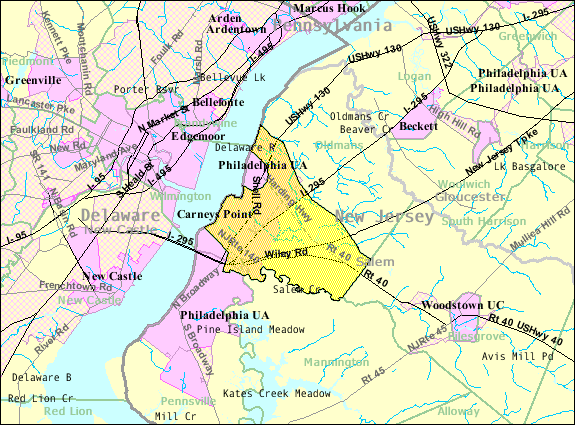
- Census Bureau map of Carneys Point Township, New Jersey

- Location in Salem County Location in New Jersey Location in the United States
- Coordinates: 39.694751°N 75.445164°W
- Country: United States
- State: New Jersey
- County: Salem
- Formed: July 10, 1721 as, Upper Penns Neck Township
- Incorporated: February 21, 1798
- Renamed: November 10, 1976, as Carneys Point Township

Government
  - Type: Township
  - Body: Township Committee
  - Mayor: Patrick Bomba (R, term ends December 31, 2026)
  - Administrator: Casey English
  - Municipal clerk: June Proffitt

Area
  - Total: 17.78 sq mi (46.05 km^{2})
  - Land: 16.91 sq mi (43.80 km^{2})
  - Water: 0.87 sq mi (2.25 km^{2}) 4.88%
  - Rank: 162nd of 565 in state 10th of 15 in county
- Elevation: 3 ft (0.91 m)

Population (2020)
  - Total: 8,637
  - Estimate (2023): 8,640
  - Rank: 276th of 565 in state 3rd of 15 in county
  - Density: 510.7/sq mi (197.2/km^{2})
  - Rank: 443rd of 565 in state 6th of 15 in county
- Time zone: UTC−05:00 (Eastern (EST))
  - Summer (DST): UTC−04:00 (Eastern (EDT))
- ZIP Code: 08069
- Area code: 856 Exchanges: 299, 351
- FIPS code: 3403310610
- GNIS feature ID: 0882135
- Website: carneyspointtwp.org

Carneys Point Township is a township in Salem County, in the U.S. state of New Jersey. As of the 2020 United States census, the township's population was 8,637, an increase of 588 (+7.3%) from the 2010 census count of 8,049, which in turn reflected an increase of 365 (+4.8%) from the 7,684 counted in the 2000 census.

Upper Penns Neck Township was formed on July 10, 1721, when Penn's Neck Township was subdivided and Lower Penns Neck Township (now Pennsville Township) was also formed. The township was incorporated by an act of the New Jersey Legislature on February 21, 1798, as one of New Jersey's original group of 104 townships. Portions of the township were taken to form Oldmans Township (February 7, 1881) and Penns Grove borough (March 8, 1894). The township was renamed Carneys Point Township based on the results of a Township meeting held on November 10, 1976, after voters approved a referendum held eight days earlier.

== Geography ==
According to the United States Census Bureau, the township had a total area of 17.78 square miles (46.05 km^{2}), including 16.91 square miles (43.80 km^{2}) of land and 0.87 square miles (2.25 km^{2}) of water (4.88%). The Salem River flows along a portion of the township's southern boundary.

Carneys Point CDP (with a 2020 Census population of 7,841) is an unincorporated community and census-designated place (CDP) located within Carneys Point Township.

Other unincorporated communities, localities and place names located partially or completely within the township include Biddles Landing, Helms Cove, Iddles Landing, Laytons Lake and Riddles Landing.

The township borders the Salem County municipalities of Mannington Township, Oldmans Township, Pennsville Township, Penns Grove and Pilesgrove Township.

Carneys Point Township is connected to the State of Delaware by the Delaware Memorial Bridges over the Delaware River.

=== Dupont Chambers Works ===
The township is home to the Dupont Corporation Chambers Works, a facility covering 1,445 acres (585 ha) that was listed No. 4 on the Mother Jones top 20 polluters of 2010, legally discharging over 5,000,000 pounds (2,300,000 kg) of toxic chemicals into New Jersey and Delaware River waterways. In 2016, the township initiated a $1.1 billion lawsuit against the corporation, accusing it of divesting the Chambers Works to Chemours without first remediating the property as required by law to address the 100,000,000 pounds (45,000,000 kg) of pollutants emitted into the soil and water in the century that the facility has been in operation.

== Demographics ==
Historical population
Census	Pop.	Note	%±
1810	1,638		—
1820	1,861		13.6%
1830	1,638		−12.0%
1840	1,854		13.2%
1850	2,422		30.6%
1860	2,901		19.8%
1870	3,178		9.5%
1880	3,301		3.9%
1890	2,239	*	−32.2%
1900	775	*	−65.4%
1910	744		−4.0%
1920	6,259		741.3%
1930	3,879		−38.0%
1940	4,805		23.9%
1950	6,717		39.8%
1960	7,595		13.1%
1970	7,016		−7.6%
1980	8,396		19.7%
1990	8,443		0.6%
2000	7,684		−9.0%
2010	8,049		4.8%
2020	8,637		7.3%
2023 (est.)	8,640	▲	0.0%
Population sources: 1810–2000; 1810–1920 1840 1850–1870; 1850 1870 1880–1890; 1890–1910 1910–1930; 1940–2000 2000; 2010 2020 * = Lost territory in previous decade.

=== 2010 census ===
The 2010 United States census counted 8,049 people, 3,264 households, and 2,033 families in the township. The population density was 477.3 inhabitants per square mile (184.3/km^{2}). There were 3,502 housing units at an average density of 207.7 per square mile (80.2/km^{2}). The racial makeup was 74.08% (5,963) White, 16.91% (1,361) Black or African American, 0.21% (17) Native American, 0.81% (65) Asian, 0.00% (0) Pacific Islander, 5.65% (455) from other races, and 2.34% (188) from two or more races. Hispanic or Latino of any race were 11.18% (900) of the population.

Of the 3,264 households, 23.7% had children under the age of 18; 43.8% were married couples living together; 13.3% had a female householder with no husband present and 37.7% were non-families. Of all households, 32.2% were made up of individuals and 14.0% had someone living alone who was 65 years of age or older. The average household size was 2.36 and the average family size was 2.97.

20.1% of the population were under the age of 18, 7.4% from 18 to 24, 24.7% from 25 to 44, 29.1% from 45 to 64, and 18.7% who were 65 years of age or older. The median age was 43.2 years. For every 100 females, the population had 90.2 males. For every 100 females ages 18 and older there were 85.3 males.

The Census Bureau's 2006–2010 American Community Survey showed that (in 2010 inflation-adjusted dollars) median household income was $51,277 (with a margin of error of +/− $4,039) and the median family income was $65,224 (+/− $7,825). Males had a median income of $46,529 (+/− $2,972) versus $39,722 (+/− $5,309) for females. The per capita income for the borough was $26,020 (+/− $2,212). About 4.3% of families and 7.5% of the population were below the poverty line, including 11.2% of those under age 18 and 8.1% of those age 65 or over.

=== 2000 census ===
As of the 2000 United States census there were 7,684 people, 3,121 households, and 2,050 families residing in the township. The population density was 439.1 inhabitants per square mile (169.5/km^{2}). There were 3,330 housing units at an average density of 190.3 per square mile (73.5/km^{2}). The racial makeup of the township was 78.53% White, 16.27% African American, 0.27% Native American, 0.91% Asian, 0.04% Pacific Islander, 2.10% from other races, and 1.89% from two or more races. Hispanic or Latino of any race were 3.98% of the population.

There were 3,121 households, out of which 28.3% had children under the age of 18 living with them, 48.7% were married couples living together, 12.9% had a female householder with no husband present, and 34.3% were non-families. 29.3% of all households were made up of individuals, and 12.1% had someone living alone who was 65 years of age or older. The average household size was 2.42 and the average family size was 2.99.

In the township the population was spread out, with 22.9% under the age of 18, 8.6% from 18 to 24, 28.1% from 25 to 44, 24.3% from 45 to 64, and 16.2% who were 65 years of age or older. The median age was 39 years. For every 100 females, there were 91.3 males. For every 100 females age 18 and over, there were 87.3 males.

The median income for a household in the township was $41,007, and the median income for a family was $52,213. Males had a median income of $39,861 versus $26,773 for females. The per capita income for the township was $19,978. About 8.3% of families and 10.8% of the population were below the poverty line, including 11.9% of those under age 18 and 9.0% of those age 65 or over.

== Government ==
=== Local government ===
Carneys Point Township is governed under the Township form of New Jersey municipal government, one of 141 municipalities (of the 564) statewide that use this form, the second-most commonly used form of government in the state. The Township Committee is comprised of five members, who are elected directly by the voters at-large in partisan elections to serve three-year terms of office on a staggered basis, with either one or two seats coming up for election each year as part of the November general election in a three-year cycle. At an annual reorganization meeting, the Township Committee selects one of its members to serve as Mayor and another as Deputy Mayor.

As of 2022, members of the Carneys Point Township Committee are Mayor Kenneth H. Brown (D, term on committee ends December 31, 2023; term as mayor ends 2022), Deputy Mayor Patrick D. Bomba (D, term on committee ends 2024; term as deputy mayor ends 2022), Marcus E. Dowe Jr. (D, 2022), Kenneth R. Dennis (R, 2023; elected to serve an unexpired term) and Wayne D. Pelura (R, 2022).

After counting all ballots in the November 2014 general election, incumbent Democrat Charles C. Newton and his Republican challenger Joseph F. Racite were deadlocked at 1,001 votes for the second of two seats up for vote on the township committee, despite Newton's initial four-vote edge after the machine votes were counted. In a runoff election held on December 30, Racite prevailed and was elected to take the seat by a 660–585 margin.

=== Federal, state and county representation ===
Carneys Point Township is located in the 2nd Congressional District and is part of New Jersey's 3rd state legislative district.

For the 119th United States Congress, New Jersey's 2nd congressional district is represented by Jeff Van Drew (R, Dennis Township). New Jersey is represented in the United States Senate by Democrats Cory Booker (Newark, term ends 2027) and Andy Kim (Moorestown, term ends 2031).

For the 2026–2027 session, the 3rd legislative district of the New Jersey Legislature is represented in the State Senate by John Burzichelli (D, Paulsboro) and in the General Assembly by David Bailey (D, Woodstown) and Heather Simmons (D, Glassboro).

Salem County is governed by a five-member Board of County Commissioners who are elected at-large to serve three-year terms of office on a staggered basis, with either one or two seats coming up for election each year. At an annual reorganization meeting held in the beginning of January, the board selects a Director and a Deputy Director from among its members. As of 2025, Salem County's Commissioners (with party, residence, and term-end year listed in parentheses) are:

Director Benjamin H. Laury (R, Elmer, 2027), Deputy Director Cordy Taylor (R, Oldmans Township, 2028), Paul Collier (R, Lower Alloways Creek, 2027), Ed Ramsey (R, Pittsgrove Township, 2026), and Daniel Timmerman (R, Elmer, 2028).

Constitutional officers elected on a countywide basis are: Clerk Dale A. Cross (R, Pennsville Township, 2029), Sheriff Charles M. Miller (R, Salem, 2027) and Surrogate Gordon J. Ostrum Jr. (R, Pilesgrove Township, 2030).

=== Politics ===
As of March 2011, there were a total of 5,154 registered voters in Carneys Point Township, of which 1,587 (30.8% vs. 30.6% countywide) were registered as Democrats, 927 (18.0% vs. 21.0%) were registered as Republicans and 2,640 (51.2% vs. 48.4%) were registered as Unaffiliated. There were no voters registered as either Libertarians or Greens. Among the township's 2010 Census population, 64.0% (vs. 64.6% in Salem County) were registered to vote, including 80.1% of those ages 18 and over (vs. 84.4% countywide).

Gubernatorial election results for Carneys Point Township
Year	Republican		Democratic		Third party(ies)	
Year	No.	%	No.	%	No.	%
2025	1,116	43.14%	1,434	55.43%	37	1.43%
2021	1,080	52.20%	970	46.88%	19	0.92%
2017	815	43.12%	980	51.85%	95	5.03%
2013	1,302	60.53%	804	37.38%	45	2.09%
2009	926	42.69%	987	45.50%	256	11.80%
2005	994	43.44%	1,202	52.53%	92	4.02%

In the 2012 presidential election, Democrat Barack Obama received 58.1% of the vote (1,974 cast), ahead of Republican Mitt Romney with 40.6% (1,379 votes), and other candidates with 1.4% (46 votes), among the 3,429 ballots cast by the township's 5,397 registered voters (30 ballots were spoiled), for a turnout of 63.5%. In the 2008 presidential election, Democrat Barack Obama received 2,138 votes (57.3% vs. 50.4% countywide), ahead of Republican John McCain with 1,494 votes (40.0% vs. 46.6%) and other candidates with 61 votes (1.6% vs. 1.6%), among the 3,732 ballots cast by the township's 5,471 registered voters, for a turnout of 68.2% (vs. 71.8% in Salem County). In the 2004 presidential election, Democrat John Kerry received 1,671 votes (52.6% vs. 45.9% countywide), ahead of Republican George W. Bush with 1,455 votes (45.8% vs. 52.5%) and other candidates with 28 votes (0.9% vs. 1.0%), among the 3,177 ballots cast by the township's 4,886 registered voters, for a turnout of 65.0% (vs. 71.0% in the whole county).

United States presidential election results for Carneys Point Township 2024 2020 2016 2012 2008 2004
Year	Republican		Democratic		Third party(ies)	
Year	No.	%	No.	%	No.	%
2024	1,645	46.96%	1,796	51.27%	62	1.77%
2020	1,744	43.87%	2,157	54.26%	74	1.86%
2016	1,568	46.61%	1,685	50.09%	111	3.30%
2012	1,379	40.57%	1,974	58.08%	46	1.35%
2008	1,494	40.45%	2,138	57.89%	61	1.65%
2004	1,455	46.13%	1,671	52.98%	28	0.89%

In the 2013 gubernatorial election, Republican Chris Christie received 61.4% of the vote (1,352 cast), ahead of Democrat Barbara Buono with 36.5% (804 votes), and other candidates with 2.0% (45 votes), among the 2,375 ballots cast by the township's 5,308 registered voters (174 ballots were spoiled), for a turnout of 44.7%. In the 2009 gubernatorial election, Democrat Jon Corzine received 987 ballots cast (42.7% vs. 39.9% countywide), ahead of Republican Chris Christie with 926 votes (40.1% vs. 46.1%), Independent Chris Daggett with 209 votes (9.0% vs. 9.7%) and other candidates with 47 votes (2.0% vs. 2.0%), among the 2,312 ballots cast by the township's 5,406 registered voters, yielding a 42.8% turnout (vs. 47.3% in the county).

United States Senate election results for Carneys Point Township1
Year	Republican		Democratic		Third party(ies)	
Year	No.	%	No.	%	No.	%
2024	1,524	43.73%	1,826	52.40%	135	3.87%
2018	1,275	48.79%	1,208	46.23%	130	4.98%
2012	1,217	36.92%	1,964	59.59%	115	3.49%
2006	1,070	45.44%	1,210	51.38%	75	3.18%

United States Senate election results for Carneys Point Township2
Year	Republican		Democratic		Third party(ies)	
Year	No.	%	No.	%	No.	%
2020	1,640	41.55%	2,142	54.27%	165	4.18%
2014	902	43.20%	1,099	52.63%	87	4.17%
2013	512	48.81%	525	50.05%	12	1.14%
2008	1,226	34.33%	2,181	61.08%	164	4.59%

== Education ==
Students in public school for pre-kindergarten through twelfth grade attend the Penns Grove-Carneys Point Regional School District, together with students from Penns Grove. Most students in grades 9 to 12 from Oldmans Township attend the district's high school as part of a sending/receiving relationship with the Oldmans Township School District, with the balance attending Woodstown High School in the Woodstown-Pilesgrove Regional School District.

As of the 2018–19 school year, the district, comprised of five schools, had an enrollment of 2,185 students and 182.0 classroom teachers (on an FTE basis), for a student–teacher ratio of 12.0:1. Schools in the district (with 2018–19 enrollment data from the National Center for Education Statistics) are Lafayette-Pershing School with 331 students in grades Pre-K to Kindergarten, Field Street School with 480 students in grades 1–3, Paul W. Carleton School with 355 students in grades 4–5, Penns Grove Middle School with 465 students in grades 6–8 and Penns Grove High School with 508 students in grades 9–12.

The Catholic K–8 school Bishop Guilfoyle Regional Catholic School in Carneys Point closed in 2010. As of 2020 Guardian Angels Regional School (Pre-K–Grade 3 campus in Gibbstown CDP and 4–8 campus in Paulsboro) takes students from Carneys Point.

== Transportation ==
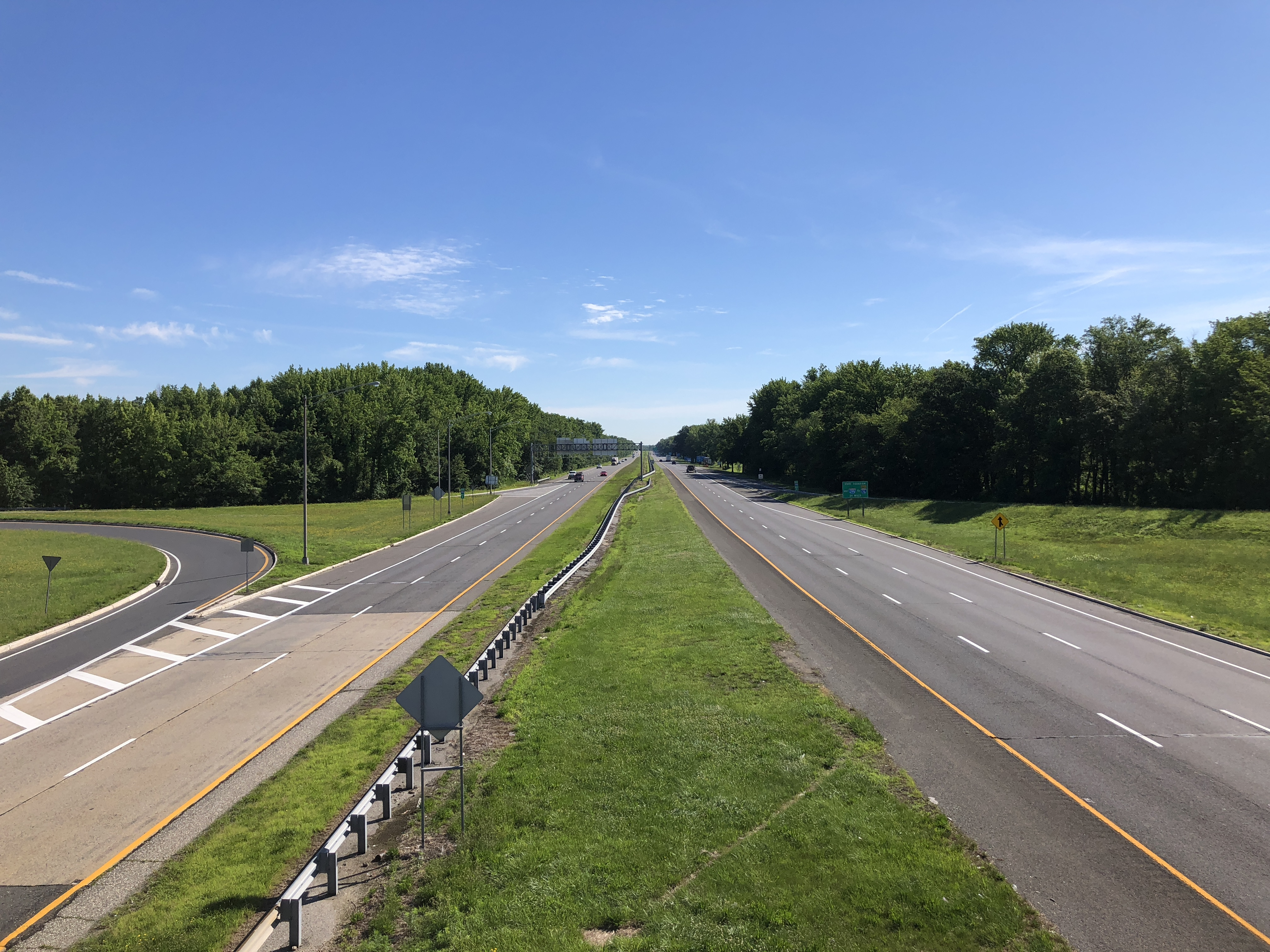
Interstate 295 northbound in Carneys Point Township

=== Roads and highways ===
Carneys Point hosts various state routes, US routes, and limited access roads. As of May 2010, the township had a total of 78.17 miles (125.80 km) of roadways, of which 35.61 miles (57.31 km) were maintained by the municipality, 20.50 miles (32.99 km) by Salem County and 17.37 miles (27.95 km) by the New Jersey Department of Transportation and 4.69 miles (7.55 km) by the New Jersey Turnpike Authority.

The New Jersey Turnpike is the most significant highway to travel through the township, which houses Interchange 1 and its high-speed toll gate featuring E-ZPass Express Lanes, and a "lighthouse" to mark the gateway of New Jersey. Interstate 295 also passes through and two exits are within the township: Exits 2 and 4. U.S. Route 40 runs through the southern part of the municipality while U.S. Route 130 travels through the northwest and goes right into Carneys Point. For state roads, the township houses Route 48, Route 49 and Route 140. Two major county routes that pass through are County Route 540 and County Route 551.

=== Public transportation ===
NJ Transit offers bus service to Philadelphia on the 402 route, with local service offered on the 468 route.

== Notable people ==
People who were born in, residents of, or otherwise closely associated with Carneys Point Township include:

- Richard Cheeseman Jr. (born 1966), United States Navy vice admiral and surface warfare officer who has served as the 60th Chief of Naval Personnel since June 2022.
- Johnny Gaudreau (1993–2024), professional ice hockey left winger for the Columbus Blue Jackets of the NHL
- Betty Metcalf (1921–2017), Florida state representative and clinical psychologist, was born in Carneys Point Township
- Lavar Scott (born 2003), professional stock car racing driver who competes in the ARCA Menards Series East
- Mike Shawaryn (born 1994), professional baseball player
- Bruce Willis (born 1955), actor
