= Carneys Point (CDP), New Jersey =

Populated place in Salem County, New Jersey, US

Carneys Point, New Jersey
- Census-designated place
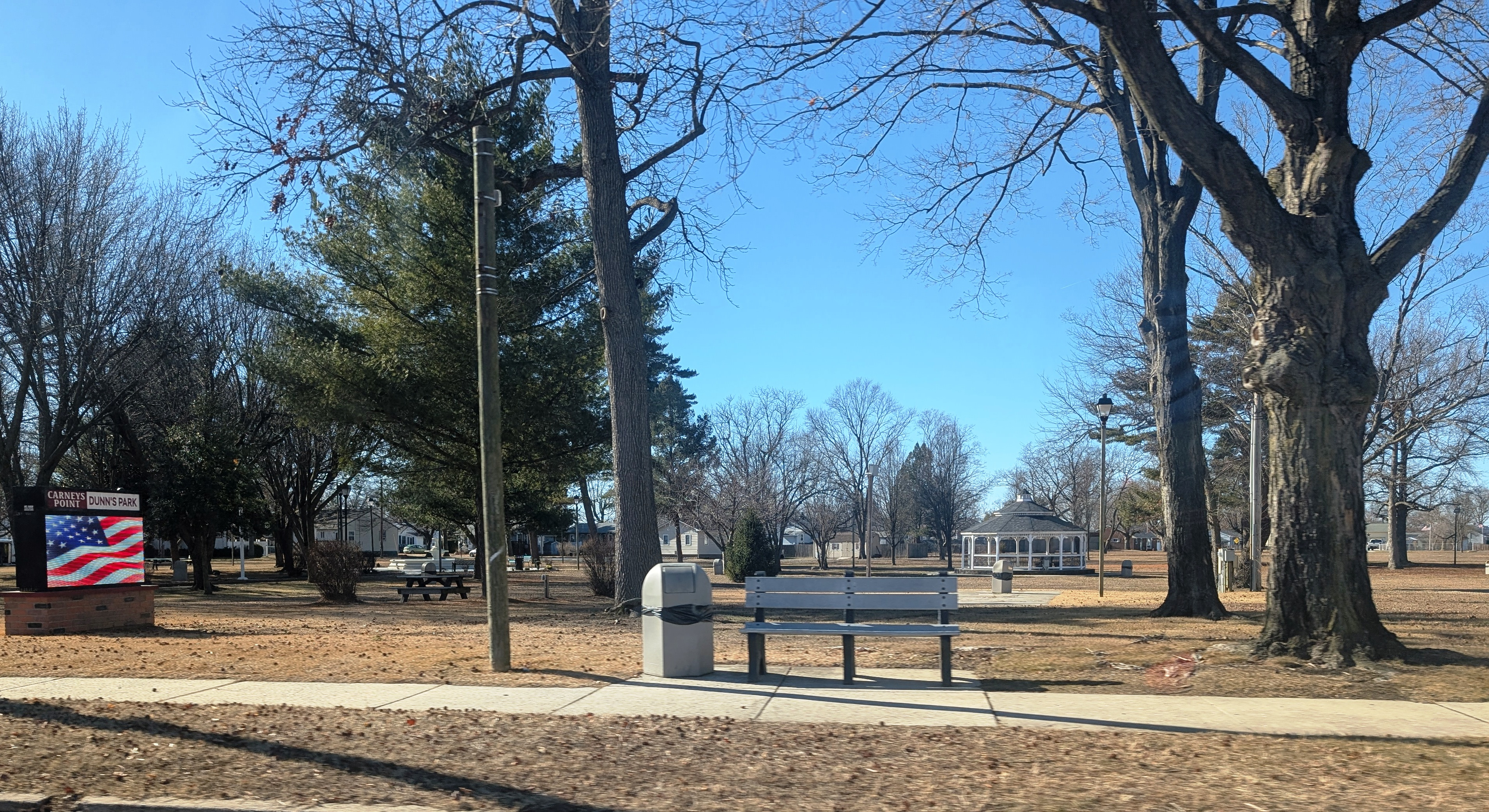
- Dunn's Park in the denser section of Carneys Point

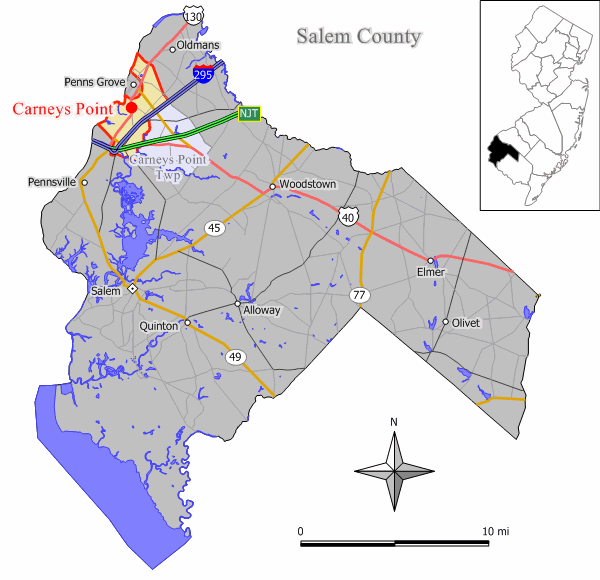
- Map of Carneys Point CDP in Salem County. Inset: Location of Salem County in New Jersey.
- Coordinates: 39.705469°N 75.468143°W
- Country: United States
- State: New Jersey
- County: Salem
- Township: Carneys Point
- Named for: Thomas Carney

Area
  - Total: 8.83 sq mi (22.86 km^{2})
  - Land: 8.38 sq mi (21.70 km^{2})
  - Water: 0.44 sq mi (1.15 km^{2}) 5.00%
- Elevation: 9.8 ft (3 m)

Population (2020)
  - Total: 7,841
  - Density: 936/sq mi (361.3/km^{2})
- Time zone: UTC−05:00 (Eastern (EST))
  - Summer (DST): UTC−04:00 (Eastern (EDT))
- ZIP Code: 08069
- Area code: 856
- FIPS code: 3410600
- GNIS feature ID: 0875212

Carneys Point is an unincorporated community and census-designated place (CDP) located within Carneys Point Township, in Salem County, in the U.S. state of New Jersey. As of the 2010 United States census, the CDP's population was 7,382.

The first European settlers in the area were a group of Irish immigrants who came in 1727, which included Thomas Carney. After World War I broke out and the E.I. du Pont de Nemours plants in the area expanded, a community was constructed for the employees of the plants and was named after Thomas Carney.

== Geography ==
According to the United States Census Bureau, Carneys Point had a total area of 8.771 square miles (22.72 km^{2}), including 8.332 square miles (21.58 km^{2}) of land and 0.439 square miles (1.14 km^{2}) of water (5.00%).

== Demographics ==
Historical population
Census	Pop.	Note	%±
1980	7,574		—
1990	7,686		1.5%
2000	6,914		−10.0%
2010	7,382		6.8%
2020	7,841		6.2%
Population sources: 1950 1960 1970; 1980 1990 2000; 2010 2020

Carney's Point first appeared as a census designated place in the 1980 U.S. census.

=== 2020 census ===
Carneys Point CDP, New Jersey – Racial and ethnic composition Note: the US Census treats Hispanic/Latino as an ethnic category. This table excludes Latinos from the racial categories and assigns them to a separate category. Hispanics/Latinos may be of any race.
Race / Ethnicity (NH = Non-Hispanic)	Pop 2000	Pop 2010	Pop 2020	% 2000	% 2010	% 2020
White alone (NH)	5,230	5,049	4,328	75.64%	68.40%	55.20%
Black or African American alone (NH)	1,205	1,273	1,639	17.43%	17.24%	20.90%
Native American or Alaska Native alone (NH)	19	12	15	0.27%	0.16%	0.19%
Asian alone (NH)	60	52	99	0.87%	0.70%	1.26%
Native Hawaiian or Pacific Islander alone (NH)	3	0	0	0.04%	0.00%	0.00%
Other race alone (NH)	0	5	26	0.00%	0.07%	0.33%
Mixed race or Multiracial (NH)	110	127	307	1.59%	1.72%	3.92%
Hispanic or Latino (any race)	287	864	1,427	4.15%	11.70%	18.20%
Total	6,914	7,382	7,841	100.00%	100.00%	100.00%

=== 2010 census ===
The 2010 United States census counted 7,382 people, 2,995 households, and 1,845 families in the CDP. The population density was 886.0 people per square mile (342.1 people/km^{2}). There were 3,217 housing units at an average density of 386.1 units per square mile (149.1 units/km^{2}). The racial makeup was 72.81% (5,375) White, 17.95% (1,325) Black or African American, 0.20% (15) Native American, 0.70% (52) Asian, 0.00% (0) Pacific Islander, 5.85% (432) from other races, and 2.48% (183) from two or more races. Hispanic or Latino of any race were 11.70% (864) of the population.

Of the 2,995 households, 24.2% had children under the age of 18; 42.7% were married couples living together; 13.6% had a female householder with no husband present and 38.4% were non-families. Of all households, 32.6% were made up of individuals and 14.2% had someone living alone who was 65 years of age or older. The average household size was 2.35 and the average family size was 2.97.

20.3% of the population were under the age of 18, 7.5% from 18 to 24, 25.0% from 25 to 44, 28.5% from 45 to 64, and 18.7% who were 65 years of age or older. The median age was 42.6 years. For every 100 females, the population had 89.9 males. For every 100 females ages 18 and older there were 84.7 males.

=== 2000 census ===
As of the 2000 United States census there were 6,914 people, 2,829 households, and 1,841 families living in the town. The population density was 305.1 people/km^{2} (790 people/mi^{2}). There were 3,017 housing units at an average density of 133.1 units/km^{2} (345 units/mi^{2}). The racial makeup of the town was 77.03% White, 17.57% African American, 0.29% Native American, 0.87% Asian, 0.04% Pacific Islander, 2.21% from other races, and 1.98% from two or more races. 4.15% of the population were Hispanic or Latino of any race.

There were 2,829 households, out of which 28.4% had children under the age of 18 living with them, 47.3% were married couples living together, 13.6% had a female householder with no husband present, and 34.9% were non-families. 30.2% of all households were made up of individuals, and 12.4% had someone living alone who was 65 years of age or older. The average household size was 2.40 and the average family size was 2.98.

In the CDP the population was spread out, with 23.0% under the age of 18, 8.5% from 18 to 24, 28.4% from 25 to 44, 23.9% from 45 to 64, and 16.2% who were 65 years of age or older. The median age was 38 years. For every 100 females, there were 90.7 males. For every 100 females age 18 and over, there were 86.5 males.

The median income for a household in the CDP was $39,976, and the median income for a family was $51,270. Males had a median income of $40,195 versus $26,620 for females. The per capita income for the CDP was $19,208. 11.8% of the population and 9.3% of families were below the poverty line. Out of the total people living in poverty, 13.4% are under the age of 18 and 10.2% are 65 or older.
