= Stephen Metcalf =

Stephen Metcalf or Metcalfe may refer to:

- Stephen Metcalf (writer), writer and critic-at-large for Slate
- Stephen Metcalfe (politician) (born 1966), British politician
- Stephen Metcalfe (screenwriter) (fl. 2002–2015), American film director and screenwriter
- Stephen A. Metcalf (1927–2014), British missionary

== See also ==
- Steve Metcalf (fl. 1998–2004), American lobbyist and former politician from North Carolina
- Metcalf (surname)
- Metcalfe (surname)
