= Mike Shawaryn =

American baseball player (born 1994)

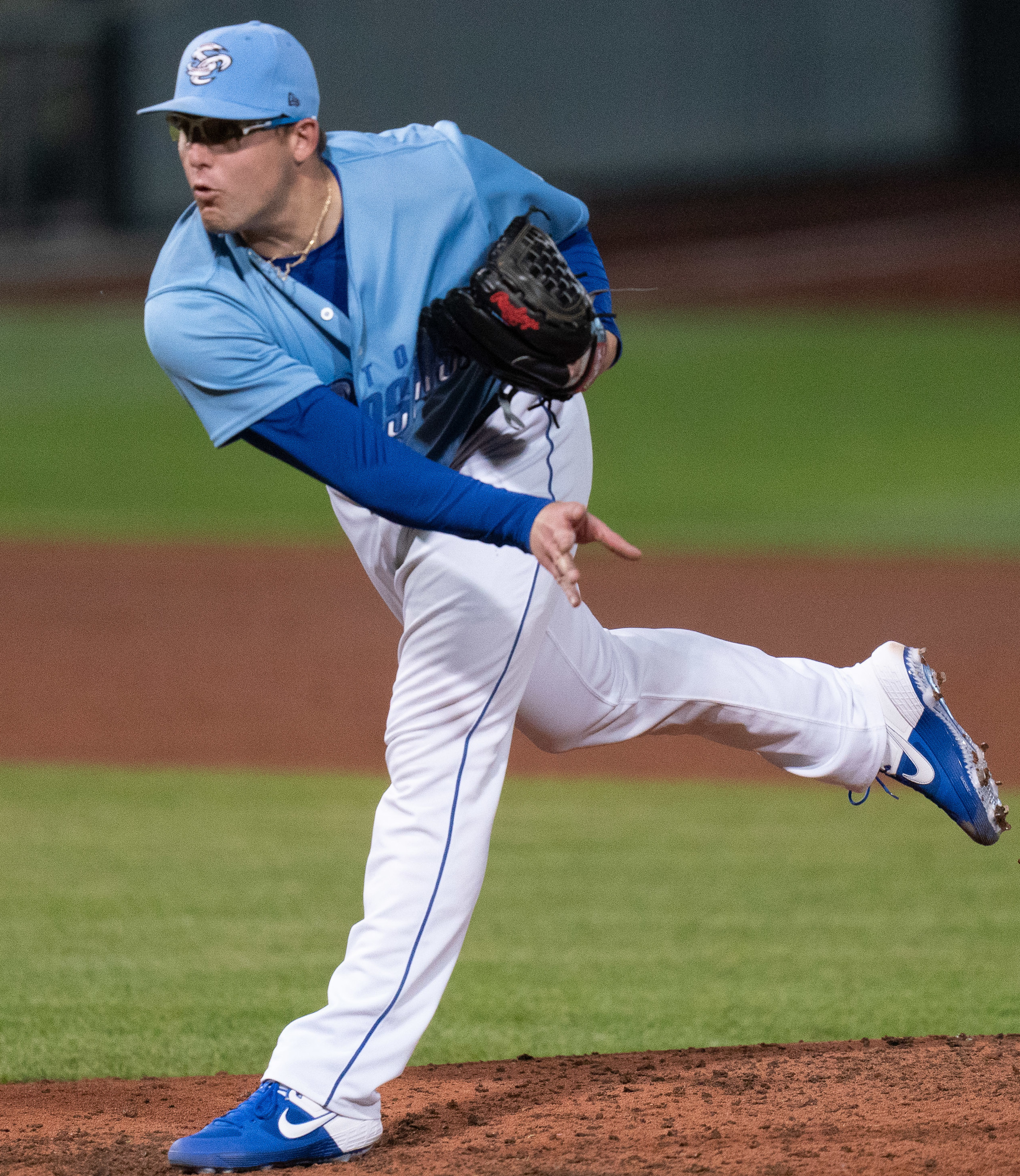
- Shawaryn with the Omaha Storm Chasers in 2021

Free agent
- Pitcher
- Born: September 17, 1994 (age 31); Carneys Point, New Jersey, U.S.
- Bats: Right Throws: Right

MLB debut
- June 7, 2019, for the Boston Red Sox

MLB statistics (through 2019 season)
- Win–loss record: 0–0
- Earned run average: 9.74
- Strikeouts: 29
- Stats at Baseball Reference

Teams
- Boston Red Sox (2019)

Michael Thomas Shawaryn (born September 17, 1994) is an American professional baseball pitcher who is a free agent. He has previously played in Major League Baseball (MLB) for the Boston Red Sox. Listed at 6 feet 2 inches (1.88 m) and 200 pounds (91 kg), he throws and bats right-handed.

== Amateur career ==
Shawaryn grew up in Carneys Point, New Jersey, and graduated from Gloucester Catholic High School in 2013, where he pitched for the school's baseball team, and helped lead them to four state championships. Shawaryn also helped lead his Brooklawn Legion Baseball team to a 2013 American Legion World Series title. Shawaryn was recruited by Duke, Maryland, LSU, Stony Brook and Vanderbilt. Shawaryn was also recruited by Monmouth, whose pitching coach soon left for Maryland. Shawaryn chose to play college baseball at Maryland, persuaded by the pitching coach who went to his games on the Terrapins' off days. He became known as the “unicorn” in Maryland after not making a commitment until February. Shawaryn was previously drafted by the Kansas City Royals in the 32nd round of the 2013 MLB draft, but did not sign because of his commitment to Maryland. He pursued a degree in business. In 2015, he played collegiate summer baseball in the Cape Cod Baseball League for the Yarmouth-Dennis Red Sox. Coming into the 2016 college season, Shawaryn was named a first team All-American. He set multiple program records during his three seasons at Maryland, including career wins (30), career strikeouts (307), and single-season wins (13, in 2015).

== Professional career ==
=== Boston Red Sox ===
Shawaryn was drafted by the Boston Red Sox in the fifth round of the 2016 MLB draft, and signed with them. He joined the Low-A Lowell Spinners, where he posted a 2.87 ERA in 15 2/3 innings pitched. In 2017, he split time between the Single-A Greenville Drive and the High-A Salem Red Sox where he went a combined 8–7 with a 3.81 ERA between both clubs. Shawaryn started the 2018 season with the Double-A Portland Sea Dogs. In 19 appearances (all starts), he compiled a 6–8 record with a 3.28 ERA, 99 strikeouts, and 27 walks in 112 2/3 innings pitched. Shawaryn was promoted to the Triple-A Pawtucket Red Sox on August 3, appearing in seven games (six starts) with a 3.93 ERA and 3–2 record.

Shawaryn started the 2019 season with Pawtucket. On May 30, he was added to Boston's active MLB roster, as Héctor Velázquez was placed on the injured list. Shawaryn made his MLB debut on June 7 against the Tampa Bay Rays, pitching two innings in relief and striking out four while giving up one run on a home run by Kevin Kiermaier. Shawaryn was optioned back to Pawtucket on July 1, having appeared eight games (all in relief) with an 8.53 ERA while striking out 20 in 12 2/3 innings. He was recalled to Boston on September 4, following the end of the Triple-A season. Overall with the 2019 Red Sox, Shawaryn appeared in 14 games, recording a 9.74 ERA and 29 strikeouts in 20 1/3 innings.

Shawaryn was optioned to Triple-A Pawtucket on March 8, 2020. On August 19, he was designated for assignment. The club assigned him outright to Pawtucket on August 26. The Red Sox released Shawaryn on April 25, 2021.

=== Kansas City Royals ===
On April 27, 2021, Shawaryn signed a minor league contract with the Kansas City Royals organization. Shawaryn recorded a 4.63 ERA in 9 appearances with the Triple-A Omaha Storm Chasers before being released on June 14.

=== Lake Country DockHounds ===
On March 14, 2023, Shawaryn signed with the Lake Country DockHounds of the American Association of Professional Baseball. In 18 games (16 starts) for the DockHounds, he posted a 4–9 record and 6.26 ERA with 77 strikeouts across 96 1/3 innings pitched. In addition, he was named an All–Star for the team in 2023. Shawaryn became a free agent after the season.

=== Staten Island FerryHawks ===
On March 28, 2024, Shawaryn signed with the Staten Island FerryHawks of the Atlantic League of Professional Baseball. In 21 starts for Staten Island, Shawaryn struggled to a 6–9 record and 6.59 ERA with 79 strikeouts across 110 2/3 innings pitched. He became a free agent following the season.

=== Cleburne Railroaders ===
On March 5, 2025, Shawaryn signed with the Cleburne Railroaders of the American Association of Professional Baseball. He made 19 starts for the Railroaders, compiling a 3-12 record and 5.38 ERA with 87 strikeouts across 110 1/3 innings pitched. Shawaryn was released by Cleburne on August 29.
