= Edward J. Cleary =

American politician

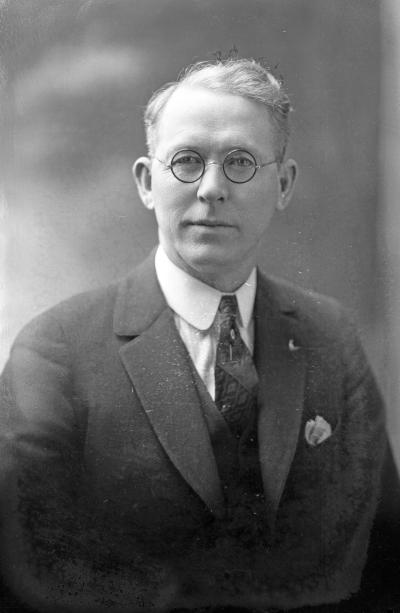
- Cleary in 1925

President pro tempore of the Washington Senate
- In office January 12, 1925 – January 10, 1927
- Preceded by: Phillip H. Carlyon
- Succeeded by: Ralph Metcalf

Member of the Washington State Senate for the 42nd district
- In office 1915–1935

Personal details
- Born: July 17, 1866 Briggsville, Wisconsin, United States
- Died: April 5, 1942 (aged 75) Bellingham, Washington, United States
- Party: Republican

Edward Joseph Cleary (July 17, 1866 – April 5, 1942) was an American politician in the state of Washington. He served in the Washington State Senate from 1915 to 1935. From 1925 to 1927, he was President pro tempore of the Senate.
