= Henry Metcalfe =

Henry Metcalfe may refer to:

- Henry Metcalfe (military officer) (1847–1927), American Army ordnance officer, inventor and early organizational theorist
- Henry B. Metcalfe (1805–1881), U.S. Representative from New York
- Henry James Metcalfe (1835–1906), bandmaster, composer and publisher of music

== See also ==
- James Henry Metcalfe (1848–1925), Ontario businessman and political figure
- Henry Metcalf (disambiguation)
