= Martyr of charity =

Type of martyr in the Catholic Church

In the Catholic Church, a martyr of charity is someone who dies as a result of a charitable act or of administering Christian charity. While a martyr of the faith, which is what is usually meant by the word "martyr" (both in canon law and in lay terms), dies through being persecuted for being a Catholic or for being a Christian, a martyr of charity dies through practicing charity motivated by Christianity. This is an unofficial form of martyrdom; when Pope Paul VI beatified Maximilian Kolbe he gave him that honorary title. (In 1982, when Kolbe was canonized by Pope John Paul II that title was still not given official canonical recognition; instead, John Paul II overruled his advisory commission, which had said Kolbe was a Confessor, not a Martyr, ruling that the systematic hatred of the Nazis as a group toward the rest of humanity was in itself a form of hatred of the faith.)

== List of martyrs of charity ==
- Lawrence of Rome, executed in the Diocletianic persecution after distributing church valuables among the poor instead of to the Emperor.
- Father Damien, contracted leprosy from his patients at Kalaupapa; canonized in 2009
- Maximilian Kolbe, volunteered for fatal collective punishment in Auschwitz; canonized in 1982
- Everard Mercurian, died ministering in an influenza epidemic in 1580.
- Edward Metcalfe, died ministering in an epidemic in Leeds in 1847.
- Benjamin Petit, died travelling as a missionary to the Potawatomi in 1839
- The Martyrs of Memphis, Constance and her companions, died during the yellow fever epidemic of 1878 of the disease while ministering to the sick. Their feast day, September 9th, was added to the Episcopal Church's calendar as a lesser feast in 1981.
- Bernardo Tolomei, died ministering in a plague epidemic in 1348; canonized in 2009
- Sára Salkaházi, executed for sheltering Jews from The Holocaust; beatified in 2006
- Aloysius Gonzaga, died while ministering to victims of a plague in Rome in 1591. Canonized in 1726.
- Ezechiele Ramin, died in 1985 while defending the rights of the farmers and the Paiter people of the Rondônia area (Brazil).
- Cassandra Martyrs of Charity, a group of religious nuns and priests who died in 1983 while saving victims in a shipwreck in the Philippines.
