= Henry Metcalf =

Henry Metcalf may refer to:

- Henry Metcalf (rugby union) (1878–1966), South African rugby union player
- Henry B. Metcalf (1829–1904), prohibitionist in the United States
- Henry C. Metcalf (1867–1942), American organizational theorist
- Henry Harrison Metcalf (1841–1932), American editor, journalist, historian and politician

== See also ==
- Henry Metcalfe (disambiguation)
