= Phillip H. Carlyon =

American politician

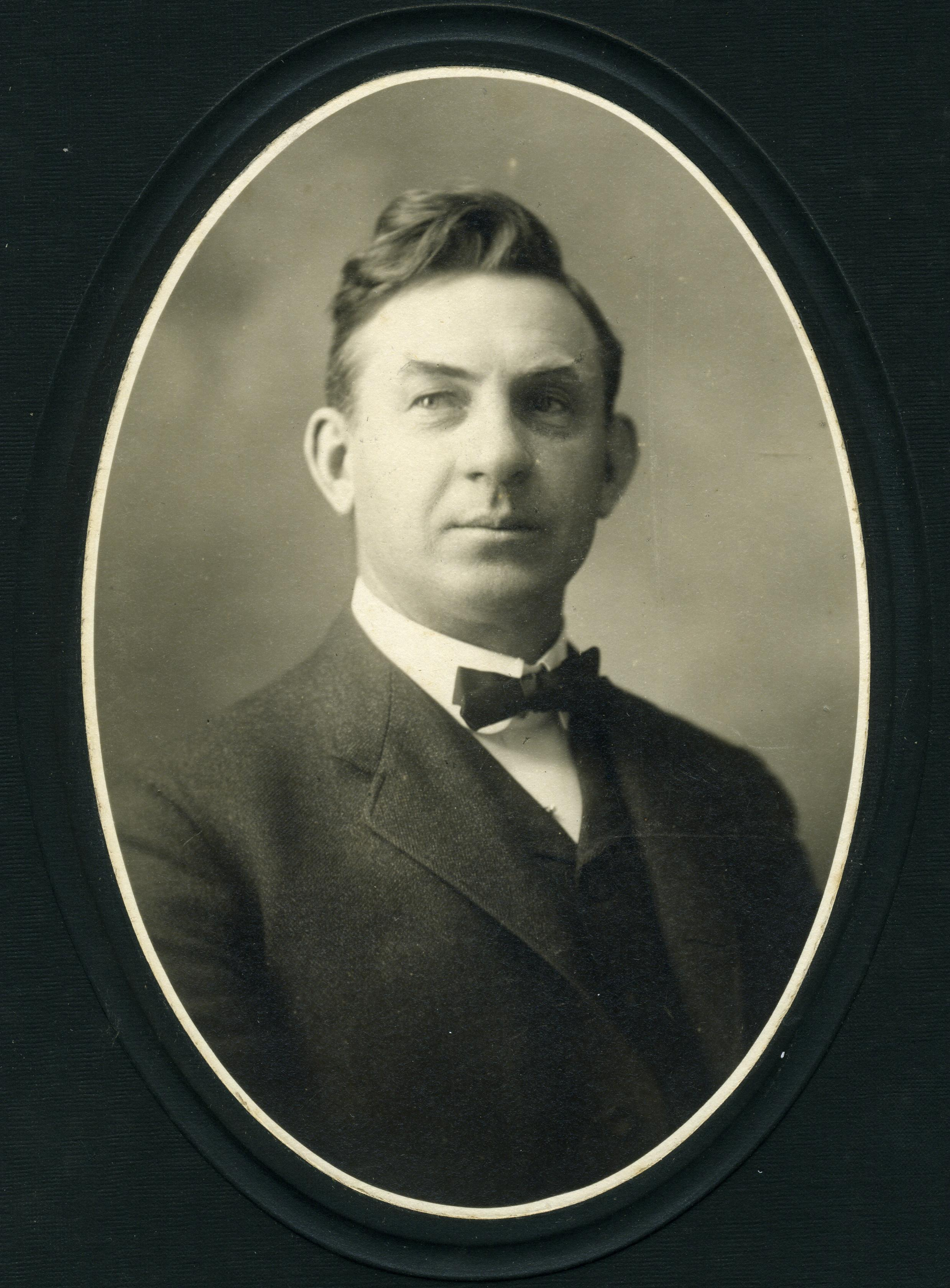
- Carlyon in 1905

President pro tempore of the Washington Senate
- In office January 8, 1923 – January 12, 1925
- Preceded by: Howard D. Taylor
- Succeeded by: Edward J. Cleary
- In office January 13, 1919 – February 2, 1919
- Preceded by: Ralph D. Nichols
- Succeeded by: Howard D. Taylor

Member of the Washington House of Representatives for the 28th district
- In office 1907–1913

Member of the Washington State Senate for the 22nd district
- In office 1913–1929

Personal details
- Born: January 6, 1863 Wisconsin, United States
- Died: November 26, 1946 (aged 83) Olympia, Washington, United States
- Party: Republican

Phillip Henry Carlyon (January 6, 1863 – November 26, 1946) was an American politician in the state of Washington.

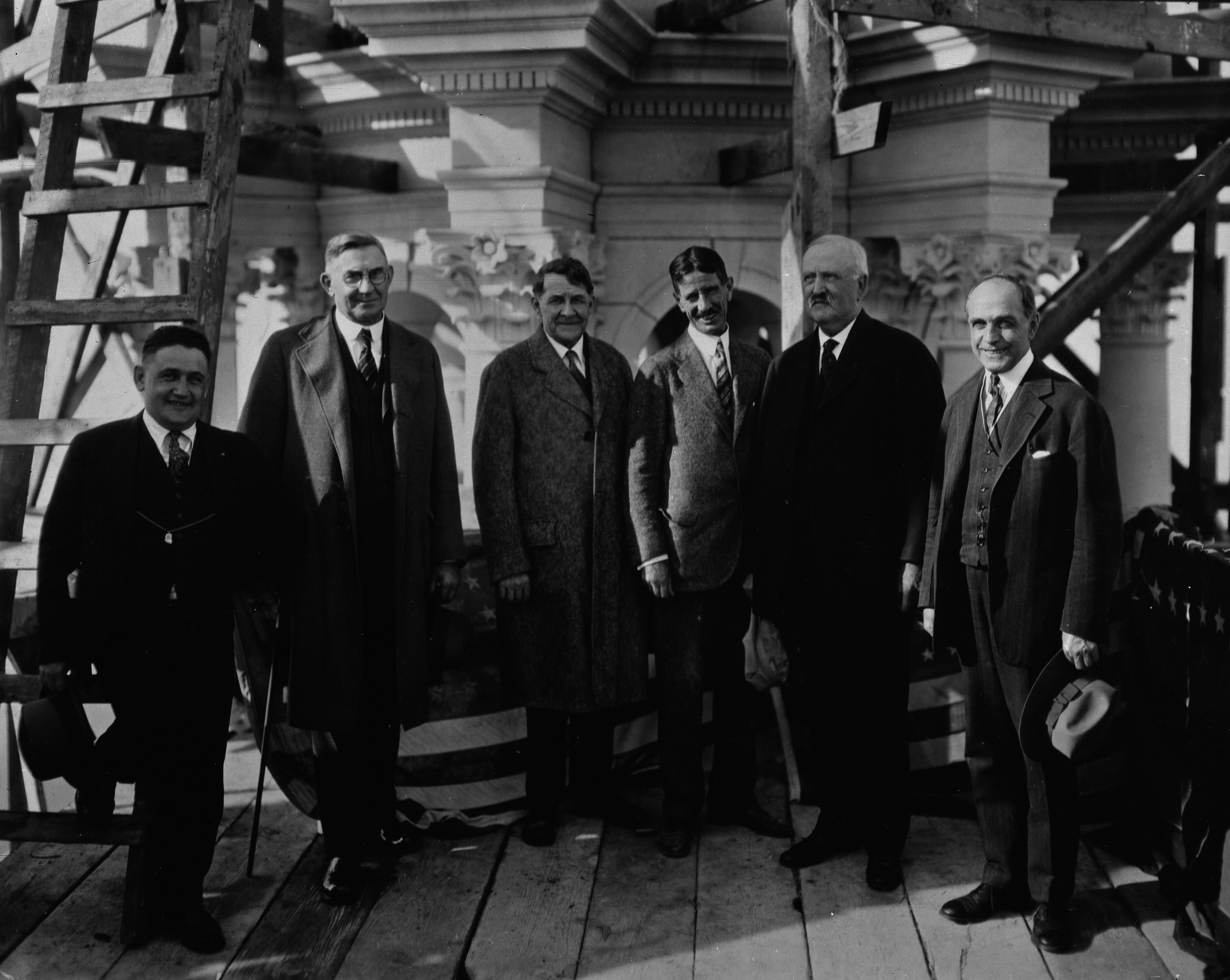
Carlyon (second from left) at the Capitol Legislative Building topping-out ceremonies, October 13, 1926.

He served in the Washington House of Representatives.

He served as Speaker from 1933 to 1935 and from 1945 to 1947.
