= Justice Metcalf =

Justice Metcalf may refer to:

- Lee Metcalf (1911–1978), associate justice of the Montana Supreme Court
- Theron Metcalf (1784–1875), associate justice of the Massachusetts Supreme Judicial Court
