= William Metcalf =

William Metcalf may refer to:

- William Henry Metcalf (businessman) (1821–1892), American businessman and art collector
- William Metcalf (manufacturer) (1838–1909), American steel producer
- William E. Metcalf (1947–2025), American numismatist
- William Henry Metcalf (VC) (1885–1968), World War I soldier and Victoria Cross recipient
- Will Metcalf (born 1984), American politician

== See also ==
- William Metcalfe (1788–1862), English-American minister, physician, and activist
