= Dick Metcalf =

American journalist

Dick Metcalf (May 3, 1946 to October 14, 2023) was an American journalist best known for having written for Guns & Ammo, where he also served as a technical editor, as well as having been in TV programs such as the Sportsman Channel's "Modern Rifle Adventures TV". Having "devoted nearly his entire adult life" to discussing the arms industry, he also is a U.S. Army veteran that has served as a faculty member of the history departments at the Yale and Cornell Universities. He died on October 14, 2023, at the age of 77.

== Background and career ==
Metcalf was born and raised in Illinois on a family farm, property dating back generations. From childhood on, he grew more and more interested in shooting and hunting, particularly hunting with handguns. He has served in the U.S. Army and as a teacher of history at both Yale and Cornell.

He has written about firearms for decades. He's a former columnist for Guns & Ammo and has served as a technical editor of the magazine. He's additionally been a TV personality, appearing in the Sportsman Channel's show "Modern Rifle Adventures TV".

He was seen as a hunting and self-defense enthusiast.

== Controversial dismissal from Guns & Ammo ==
In November 2013, Metcalf was fired from Guns & Ammo after a column he wrote on what he thought were appropriate limits to Second Amendment rights became controversial and sponsors of the magazine threatened to withdraw funding.

Before Metcalf's dismissal, the article had been praised by the Brady Campaign to Prevent Gun Violence. The firing was criticized by a variety of publications, including conservative and pro-gun-rights periodicals such as National Review. Metcalf's column had been approved for publication by his editors at Guns & Ammo; subsequent to publication editor Jim Bequette issued an apology to the publication's enraged readership.

A TV colleague remarked to The Washington Times that Metcalf had "provided a great service to the firearms community as a reviewer of guns" but that the controversy "could be awfully hard to recover from."

== Viewpoints ==
He has stated that "way too many gun owners still seem to believe that any regulation of the right to keep and bear arms is an infringement" and that "all constitutional rights are regulated, always have been, and need to be". In terms of specific policies, he supports the requirement of adults getting a concealed carry license to take gun safety and handling classes. In his opinion, the fact that U.S. culture and law doesn't treat the First Amendment's protections of free speech as absolute shows that other protections shouldn't be treated as such either.

== See also ==
- Gun politics in the United States
- Guns & Ammo
