= Thomas Metcalfe =

Thomas Metcalfe or Metcalf may refer to:

- Thomas Metcalfe (courtier) (fl.1486), medieval Chancellor of the Duchy of Lancaster
- Thomas Metcalfe (Kentucky politician) (1780–1855), governor of Kentucky, also known as Thomas Metcalf
- Sir Thomas Metcalfe, 1st Baronet (1745–1813), Director of the East India Company, MP for Abingdon
- Sir Thomas Metcalfe, 4th Baronet (1795–1853), East India Company servant, agent to Governor General of India, son of the above
- Tom Metcalfe (1909–1969), New Zealand rugby union player
- Tom Metcalf (born 1940), baseball player
- Tom Metcalf (footballer) (1878–1938), English footballer who played for Southampton and Wolverhampton Wanderers
- Thomas R. Metcalf (born 1934), historian of South Asia
- T. Nelson Metcalf (1890–1982), American football and basketball player, coach and college athletics administrator
- Thomas Humphrey Metcalfe (c. 1761–1790), American maritime fur trader
- Thomas Metcalf (Massachusetts politician), representative to the Great and General Court
