= Betty Metcalf =

American clinical psychologist and politician

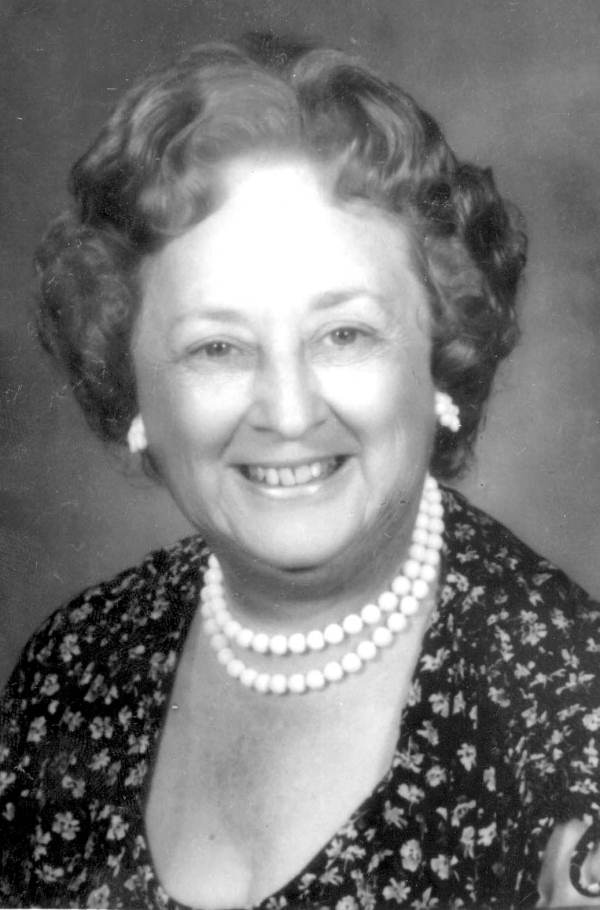

Member of the Florida House of Representatives from the 114th district
- In office 1982–1988

Personal details
- Born: August 28, 1921 Carneys Point Township, New Jersey
- Died: June 23, 2017 (aged 95) Cutler Bay, Florida
- Party: Democratic

Elizabeth Metcalf (August 28, 1921 – June 23, 2017) was an American clinical psychologist and former politician in the state of Florida. Metcalf was born in New Jersey and moved to Florida 1962. A clinical psychologist, she was an alumnus of the Swarthmore College, Yale University, and the University of Iowa. She served in the Florida House of Representatives from 1982 to 1988 for district 114. She was a member of the Democratic Party. Metcalf died on 23 June 2017, aged 95.
