= Edward Metcalfe =

Edward Metcalfe (1792 – 7 May 1847) was a British Benedictine scholar.

Metcalfe was born in Yorkshire. He entered the Benedictine monastery at Ampleforth in 1811, and was ordained five years later. He distinguished himself early as a linguist. From 1822 to 1824, he served on the mission at Kilvington.

About this time, at the request of Bishop Baines, he and some other members of the community left Ampleforth to establish a monastery at Prior Park, near Bath. On 13 March 1830, the Holy See authorized them to transfer their obedience to the vicar Apostolic; a little later, owing to some misunderstanding, they were secularized.

In 1831, Metcalfe was made chaplain to Edward Lloyd of Talacre, Flint, and soon acquired a knowledge of the Welsh language, so as to minister to the Welsh population. After five years he was transferred to Newport, and in 1844 to Bristol.

Arrangements were almost completed for his re-admission into the Benedictines in 1847, when an outbreak of fever in Leeds inspired him to offer his services to the bishop of that city; he hastened to the plague-stricken populace, and in a short time fell a victim to the epidemic. He died a martyr of charity, aged 54.

His principal works are: a Welsh translation of two of Challoner's works, "Think well on't" and "The Garden of the Soul" (Llyfr Gweddi y Catholig); also "Crynoad o'r Athrawiæth Cristionogol" (Rhyl, 1866).
