= Henry Metcalf (rugby union) =

South African rugby union player (b. 1878, d. 1966)

- Born: Henry Duke Metcalf; 20 April 1878 Caledon, South Africa
- Died: 3 March 1966 (aged 87)

Rugby union career
- Position: Forward
Provincial / State sides
| Years | Team | Apps | (Points) |
- Border
International career
| Years | Team | Apps | (Points) |
| 1903 | South Africa | 1 | (0) |
- Correct as of 3 June 2019

Henry Metcalf (20 April 1878 – 3 March 1966) was a South African international rugby union player who played as a forward.

He made 1 appearance for South Africa in 1903.
