= John Metcalf =

John Metcalf may refer to:

- John Metcalf (athlete) (born 1934), British hurdler
- John Metcalf (civil engineer) (1717–1810), British civil engineer
- John Metcalf (composer) (born 1946), British (Welsh) and Canadian composer
- John Metcalf (Massachusetts politician), representative to the Great and General Court
- John Metcalf (racing driver), NASCAR series driver
- John Metcalf (writer) (born 1938), Canadian writer and editor

== See also ==
- John Metcalfe (disambiguation)
