= Jack Metcalf =

Jack Metcalf may refer to:

- Jack Metcalf (footballer) (born 1991), English footballer
- Jack Metcalf (politician) (1927–2007), American politician
- Jack Metcalf (rugby league) (1919–2007), Australian rugby league player
- Jack Metcalf (rugby union), English rugby union player

== See also ==
- Jack Metcalfe (1912-1994), Australian track and field athlete
- John Metcalf (civil engineer) (1717-1810), British road builder, also known as "Blind Jack Metcalf"
