= George Metcalf =

George Metcalf may refer to:

- George Metcalf (footballer) (1885–?), English footballer
- George E. Metcalf (1879–1956), British missionary
- George R. Metcalf (1914–2002), American publisher, news editor, author and politician
- George Metcalf Johnson (1885–1965), American writer who wrote under the name George Metcalf

== See also ==
- George Metcalfe, London-born Australian educationalist, school proprietor and writer
