= Wilder Metcalf =

American politician (1855–1935)

Wilder Stevens Metcalf
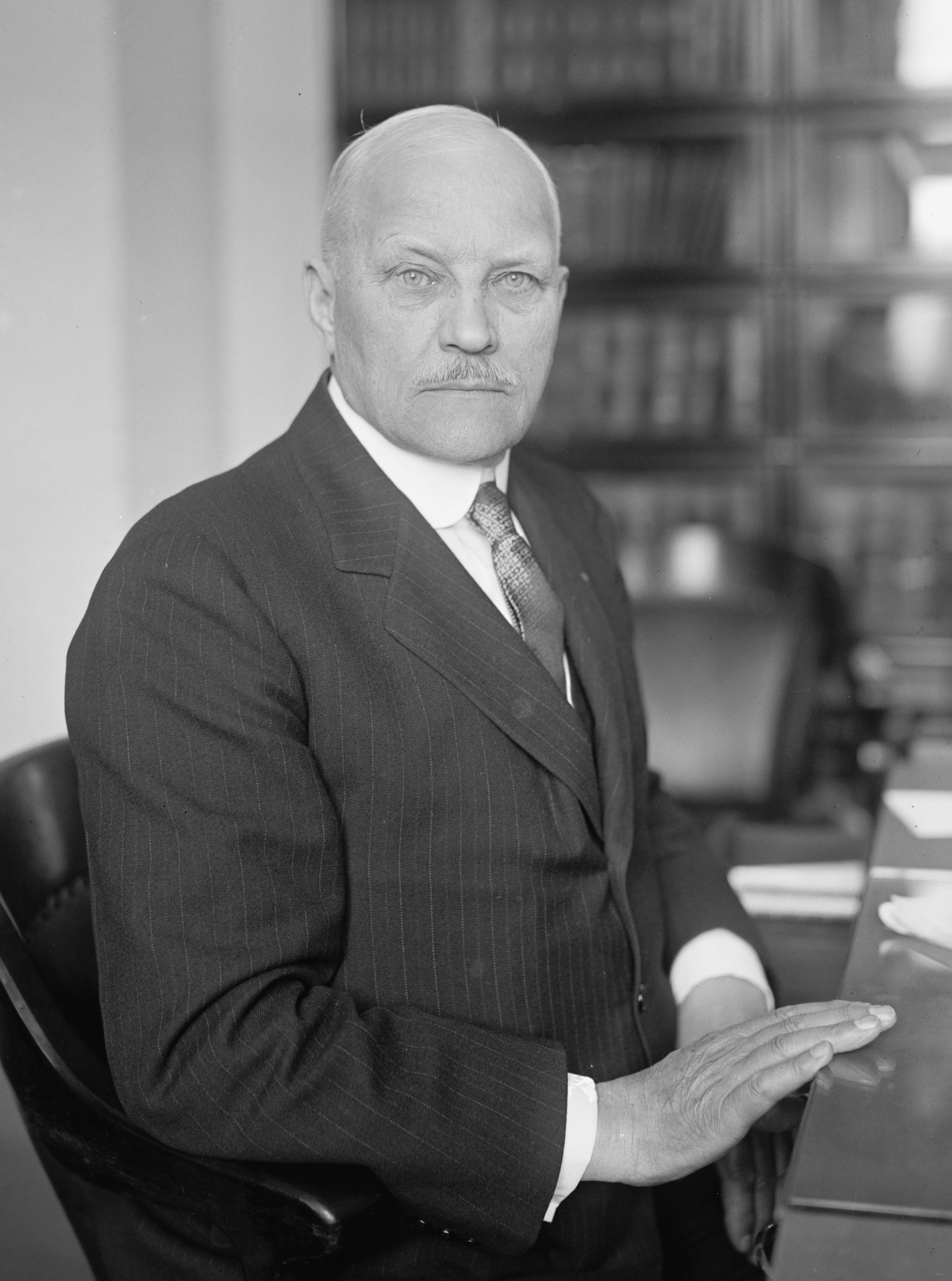
- Metcalf in 1925
- Born: September 10, 1855; Milo, Maine, US
- Died: February 1, 1935 (aged 79); Lawrence, Kansas, US
- Military career
- Allegiance: United States
- Branch: United States Army
- Service years: 1898–1917
- Rank: Major General
- Units: 5th Ohio Infantry; 20th Kansas Infantry
- Commands: 77th Infantry Brigade
- Conflicts: Spanish–American War; World War I
- Other work: Commissioner of Pensions, State Senator

Major General Wilder Stevens Metcalf (September 10, 1855 – February 1, 1935) was a U.S. Army general, Commissioner of Pensions in Washington, D.C., and Kansas state senator.

== Early life ==
Metcalf was born on September 10, 1855, to Isaac Metcalf and Antoinette Brigham Putnam Metcalf in Milo, Maine. He graduated from Oberlin College in 1878 with an A.B., and also worked with Crozier and Shelton, cheese and butter manufacturers, that same year. He worked there until 1887, when he practiced law at Russell and Metcalf, Attorneys. He continued to practice law after his Spanish–American War service, and the University of Kansas Law School awarded him an LL.B. in 1897.

== Civilian career ==
After moving to Kansas, he joined Edward Russell in the farm mortgage business, Russell & Metcalf.

== Military career ==
In 1897, he enlisted as a private in the Fifth Ohio Infantry, and then became a second lieutenant. After moving to Kansas, Metcalf enlisted as a private and later became brigadier general, Kansas National Guard, retired. He was a major and colonel with the 20th Kansas Infantry in 1898 and 1899, and served in the Philippines. He was brevetted brigadier general by President McKinley. Metcalf attended the 1900 Republican Convention in Philadelphia, Pennsylvania as a delegate-at-large. The Secretary of War appointed him a member of the Militia Board for eight years. He was commissioned a colonel (NA) on August 5, 1917, and was promoted to brigadier general (NA) on August 29, 1917. He also commanded the 77th Infantry Brigade of the 39th Division at Camp Beauregarde, Louisiana, and was honorably discharged due to age on August 29, 1917.

== Personal life and later years ==
Metcalf married Mary Eliza Crozier of Wellington, Ohio, who died in 1914; he married Alice L. Bullene on January 8, 1916. After being honorably discharged, he served as the president of the Douglas County Building and Loan Association, president of the Lawrence National Bank, and chairman of the board of the Federal Home Loan Bank in Topeka, Kansas. He also was the United States pension agent in Topeka for eight years and commissioner of pensions in Washington, D.C., for four months, after which he resigned. He was state senator for four years and was a member of the Lawrence, Kansas school board for seventeen years.

On February 1, 1935, Metcalf died at the age of seventy-nine.
