= Robert Metcalfe (disambiguation) =

Robert Metcalfe or Metcalf may refer to:

- Robert Metcalfe (born 1946), American engineer and entrepreneur
- Robert Metcalfe (Hebraist), English priest and professor of Hebrew
- Robert L. Metcalf (1916–1998), American entomologist
- Robert Metcalf (priest) (1935–2014), English priest and archdeacon of Liverpool
