= Ralph Metcalf (Washington politician) =

American politician

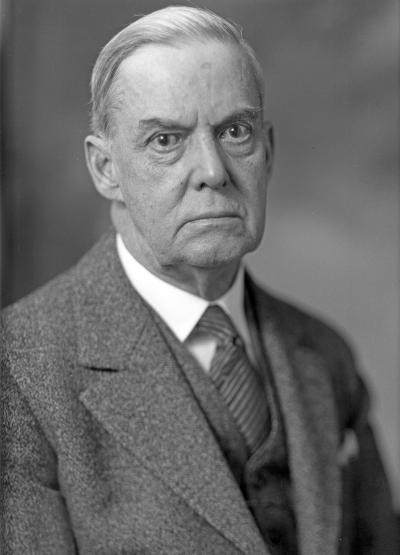
- Metcalf in 1931

President pro tempore of the Washington Senate
- In office January 10, 1927 – January 14, 1929
- Preceded by: Edward J. Cleary
- Succeeded by: Fred W. Hastings

Member of the Washington Senate from the 26th district
- In office January 14, 1907 – April 14, 1939
- Preceded by: Waldemer E. Bronson
- Succeeded by: Leo McGavick

Personal details
- Born: November 2, 1861 Providence, Rhode Island, U.S.
- Died: April 14, 1939 (aged 77) Tacoma, Washington, U.S.
- Party: Republican

Ralph Metcalf (November 2, 1861 – April 14, 1939) was an American politician in the state of Washington. He served in the Washington State Senate from 1907 to 1939. From 1927 to 1929, he was president pro tempore of the Senate.
