= T. Nelson Metcalf =

American football player, coach, and administrator

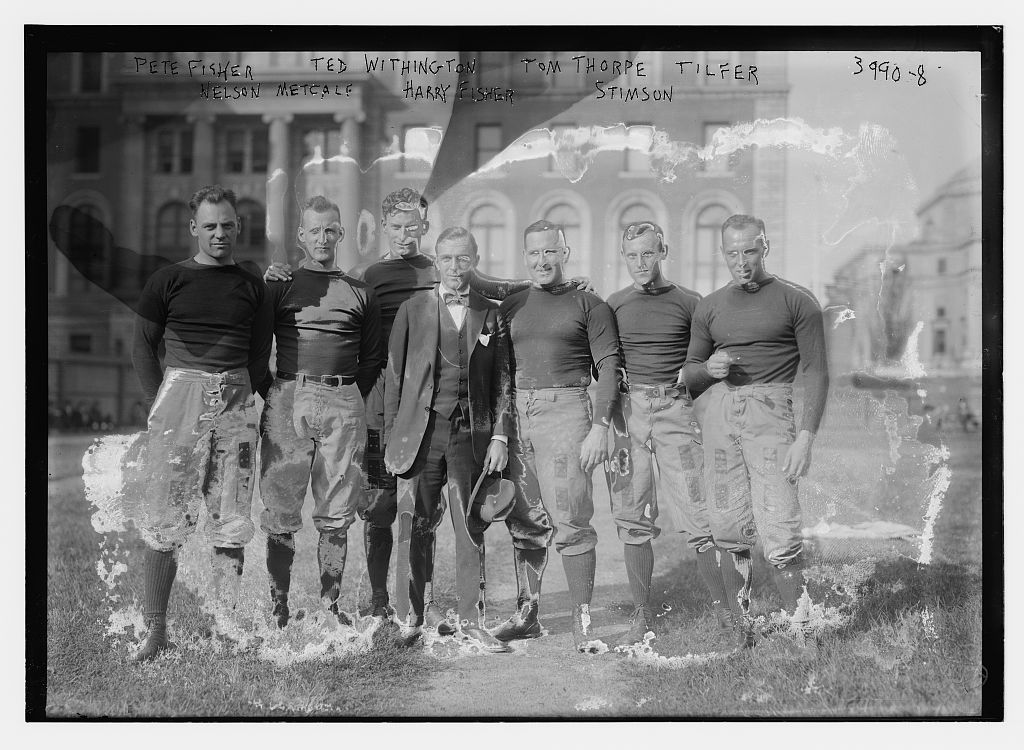
- Pete Fisher, Ted Withington, Tom Thorpe, Tilfer, Metcalf, Harry A. Fisher, Stimson at Columbia University in 1916

Biographical details
- Born: September 21, 1890; Elyria, Ohio, U.S.
- Died: January 17, 1982 (aged 91); Santa Barbara, California, U.S.

Playing career

Football
- 1909–1911: Oberlin
- Positions: End, tackle

Coaching career (HC unless noted)

Football
- 1912: Oberlin (assistant)
- 1913: Oberlin
- 1915–1917: Columbia
- 1919–1921: Columbia
- 1922–1923: Minnesota (assistant)

Administrative career (AD unless noted)
- 1924–1933: Iowa State
- 1933–1956: Chicago

Head coaching record
- Overall: 33–13–4

Accomplishments and honors

Championships
- 1 OAC (1913)

Thomas Nelson "Nellie" Metcalf (September 21, 1890 – January 17, 1982) was an American football and basketball player, track athlete, coach of football and track, professor of physical education, and college athletics administrator. He served as the head football coach at Columbia University (1915–1917) as well as his alma mater, Oberlin College (1913, 1919–1921), compiling a career college football record of 33–13–4. From 1924 to 1933, Metcalf taught at Iowa State University in the physical education department and served as the school's athletic director. He then moved on to the University of Chicago, where he was the athletic director from 1933 to 1956. At Chicago, he replaced Amos Alonzo Stagg, who was forced into retirement at the age of 70 after 40 years of service as the school's athletic director and head football coach.

While at Oberlin College, Metcalf played tackle on the football team and was also a successful two miles runner on the track and field team, once holding a conference record in that event.

== Head coaching record ==
Year	Team	Overall	Conference	Standing	Bowl/playoffs
Oberlin Yeomen (Ohio Athletic Conference) (1913)
1913	Oberlin	6–1–1	5–0–1	1st	
Columbia Lions (Independent) (1915–1917)
1915	Columbia	5–0			
1916	Columbia	1–5–2			
1917	Columbia	2–4			
Columbia:		8–9–2			
Oberlin Yeomen (Ohio Athletic Conference) (1919–1921)
1919	Oberlin	7–1	5–0	2nd	
1920	Oberlin	5–2	5–2	5th	
1921	Oberlin	7–0–1	7–0–1	3rd	
Oberlin:		25–4–2	22–2–2		
Total:		33–13–4			
National championship Conference title Conference division title or championship game berth
