= Nicholson House =

Nicholson House may refer to:

- Vaught House (Huntsville, Alabama), also known as Nicholson House, NRHP-listed
- Nicholson House (Oyster Bay, Alabama), listed on the National Register of Historic Places (NRHP) in Baldwin County
- Grace Nicholson Building, Pasadena, California, NRHP-listed in Los Angeles County
- Dr. Malcolm Nicholson Farmhouse, Havana, Florida, NRHP-listed in Gadsden County
- Nicholson-Rand House, near Indianapolis, Indiana, NRHP-listed in Marion County
- George E. Nicholson House, Kansas City, Missouri, listed on the National Register of Historic Places in Jackson County
- Shelby-Nicholson-Schindler House, Perryville, Missouri, NRHP-listed
- Abel and Mary Nicholson House, Salem, New Jersey, NRHP-listed
- Sarah and Samuel Nicholson House, Salem, New Jersey, NRHP-listed
- James Nicholson House (Lakewood, Ohio), listed on the National Register of Historic Places in Cuyahoga County
- Nicholson House and Inn, Erie, Pennsylvania, NRHP-listed
- James Nicholson House (Charleston, South Carolina), NRHP-listed
- Welch-Nicholson House and Mill Site, Houstonville, North Carolina, listed on the NRHP in Iredell County

== See also ==
- James Nicholson House (disambiguation)
