= National Register of Historic Places listings in Salem County, New Jersey =

Location of Salem County in New Jersey

List of the National Register of Historic Places listings in Salem County, New Jersey

Contents: Counties and communities in New Jersey
Atlantic – Bergen (Closter, Franklin Lakes, Ridgewood, Saddle River, Wyckoff) – Burlington – Camden – Cape May – Cumberland – Essex – Gloucester – Hudson – Hunterdon – Mercer – Middlesex – Monmouth – Morris – Ocean – Passaic – Salem – Somerset – Sussex – Union – Warren

This is intended to be a complete list of properties and districts listed on the National Register of Historic Places in Salem County, New Jersey. Latitude and longitude coordinates of the sites listed on this page may be displayed in an online map.

This National Park Service list is complete through NPS recent listings posted September 19, 2025.

	Name on the Register	Image	Date listed	Location	City or town	Description
1	Alloways Creek Friends Meetinghouse	Alloways Creek Friends Meetinghouse	December 18, 2003 (#03001306)	Buttonwood Ave, 150 ft. west of Main St. 39°30′08″N 75°27′33″W	Hancock's Bridge	
2	Moshe Bayuk House	Moshe Bayuk House	March 27, 2012 (#12000159)	984 Gershal Ave. 39°30′28″N 75°05′05″W	Pittsgrove Township	
3	Richard Brick House	Richard Brick House	May 13, 1976 (#76001183)	Northeast of Salem off NJ 45 on Compromise Rd. 39°36′44″N 75°22′56″W	Salem	
4	Broadway Historic District	Broadway Historic District	March 5, 1992 (#92000098)	Broadway from Front to Yorke Sts. 39°34′11″N 75°28′03″W	Salem	
5	Dickinson House	Dickinson House	February 20, 1975 (#75001156)	Northeast of Alloway on Brickyard Rd. 39°36′01″N 75°20′02″W	Alloway Township	
6	Zaccheus Dunn House	Zaccheus Dunn House	August 10, 1977 (#77000905)	South of Woodstown on East Lake Rd. 39°37′55″N 75°19′32″W	Woodstown	
7	Finn's Point Rear Range Light	Finn's Point Rear Range Light	August 30, 1978 (#78001792)	Northwest of Salem at Fort Mott and Lighthouse Rds. 39°37′01″N 75°32′05″W	Salem	
8	Fort Mott and Finns Point National Cemetery District	Fort Mott and Finns Point National Cemetery District	August 31, 1978 (#78001793)	Northwest of Salem on Fort Mott Road; 39°36′21″N 75°33′08″W	Salem	
9	Philip Fries House	Philip Fries House	September 28, 1990 (#90001451)	Cohansey-Daretown Road north of Alloway-Friesburg Road, Friesburg; 39°32′23″N 75°17′32″W	Alloway Township	
10	Hancock House	Hancock House	December 18, 1970 (#70000393)	Rte. 49 and Front St. 39°30′27″N 75°27′38″W	Lower Alloways Creek Township	
11	Hedge-Carpenter-Thompson Historic District	Hedge-Carpenter-Thompson Historic District	March 26, 2001 (#01000236)	Bounded by Hedge, Thompson, South Third Sts. and Oak St. Alley; 39°34′15″N 75°28′32″W	Salem	
12	Benjamin Holmes House	Benjamin Holmes House	August 31, 1978 (#78001794)	West of Salem on Fort Elfsborg-Hancock's Bridge Rd. 39°32′43″N 75°30′46″W	Salem	
13	James and Mary Lawson House	James and Mary Lawson House	February 16, 2001 (#01000042)	209 N. Main St. 39°39′20″N 75°19′39″W	Woodstown	
14	Market Street Historic District	Market Street Historic District	April 10, 1975 (#75001157)	Irregular pattern on both sides of Market Street from Broadway to Fenwick Creek; 39°34′28″N 75°28′00″W	Salem	Includes Old Salem County Courthouse
15	Marshalltown Historic District	Marshalltown Historic District	July 17, 2013 (#13000498)	Marshalltown Road and Roosevelt Avenue; 39°38′16″N 75°27′12″W	Marshalltown	African-American rural district
16	William and Margaret Mecum House	William and Margaret Mecum House	March 5, 2018 (#100002172)	168 Lighthouse Rd. 39°36′58″N 75°31′26″W	Pennsville Township	
17	Abel and Mary Nicholson House	Abel and Mary Nicholson House	January 16, 1997 (#96001548)	Jct. of Hancocks Br. and Ft. Elfsborg Rd., Elfinsboro Township; 39°31′15″N 75°29′13″W	Salem	
18	Sarah and Samuel Nicholson House	Sarah and Samuel Nicholson House	February 24, 1975 (#75001158)	2 miles (3.2 km) south of Salem on Amwellbury Rd. 39°32′28″N 75°29′19″W	Salem	
19	Pittsgrove Presbyterian Church	Pittsgrove Presbyterian Church	September 19, 1977 (#77000904)	Main St. 39°36′04″N 75°15′38″W	Upper Pittsgrove Township	
20	Salem County Insane Asylum	Salem County Insane Asylum	June 27, 2008 (#08000562)	900 Route 45; 39°37′54″N 75°21′48″W	Mannington Township	Former asylum building eyed for preservation
21	Seven Stars Tavern	Seven Stars Tavern	May 17, 1976 (#76001184)	North of Woodstown at junction of Sharptown-Swedesboro and Woodstown-Auburn Roads; 39°41′08″N 75°20′23″W	Pilesgrove Township	
22	Joseph Shinn House	Joseph Shinn House	March 7, 1979 (#79001518)	68 N. Main St. 39°39′14″N 75°19′46″W	Woodstown	
23	David V. Smith House	David V. Smith House	May 17, 1976 (#76001182)	104 S. Main St. 39°35′36″N 75°10′10″W	Elmer	
24	William Smith House	William Smith House	February 4, 1994 (#94000008)	Jct. of NJ 45 and Bassett Rd., Mannington Township; 39°36′49″N 75°24′29″W	Salem	Reported to be destroyed by fire
25	Joseph Ware House	Joseph Ware House	January 26, 1990 (#89002418)	134 Poplar St. 39°30′21″N 75°29′09″W	Hancock's Bridge	
26	John and Charlotte Wistar Farm	John and Charlotte Wistar Farm	April 22, 2016 (#15001021)	120 Harris Rd. 39°36′13″N 75°26′47″W	Mannington Township	
27	Caspar and Rebecca Wistar Farm	Caspar and Rebecca Wistar Farm	April 22, 2016 (#15001020)	84 Pointers-Auburn Rd. 39°36′22″N 75°26′36″W	Mannington Township	

== See also ==
- National Register of Historic Places listings in New Jersey
- List of National Historic Landmarks in New Jersey
