= James Nicholson House =

James Nicholson House may refer to:

- James Nicholson House (Lakewood, Ohio), listed on the National Register of Historic Places in Cuyahoga County, Ohio
- James Nicholson House (Charleston, South Carolina), NRHP-listed

== See also ==
- Nicholson House (disambiguation)
