= Joseph Shinn House =

Historic house in New Jersey, United States

- U.S. National Register of Historic Places
- New Jersey Register of Historic Places
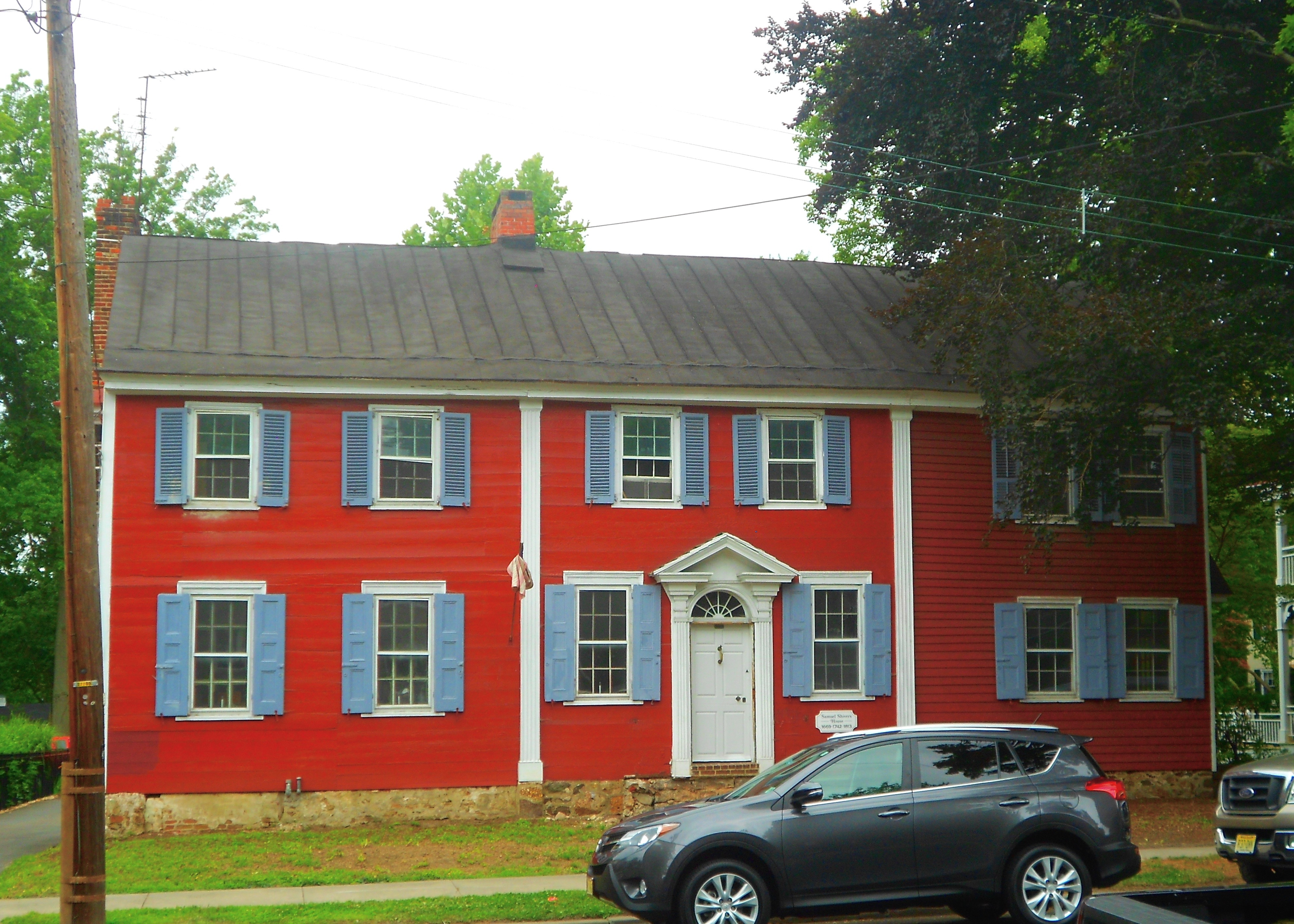
- The Old Red House

- Location within Salem County, New Jersey Location within New Jersey Location within the United States
- Location: 68 North Main Street, Woodstown, New Jersey
- Coordinates: 39°39′14″N 75°19′46″W
- Area: 0.3 acres (0.12 ha)
- Built: 1742
- Architectural style: Georgian
- NRHP reference No.: 79001518
- NJRHP No.: 2454

Significant dates
- Added to NRHP: March 7, 1979
- Designated NJRHP: August 2, 1978

Joseph Shinn House is located in Woodstown, Salem County, New Jersey. The house was built in 1742 and was added to the National Register of Historic Places on March 7, 1979, for its significance in architecture and politics/government.

== History ==
The house was built by Samuel Shivers in 1742, and then inherited by his son-in-law Joseph Shinn. The northern third of the house was built in 1812.

Shinn was a member the fifth session (June–August 1776) of the Provincial Congress of New Jersey which ordered the arrest of the colony's last royal governor William Franklin, approved the Declaration of Independence and wrote New Jersey's first state constitution (1776).

Joseph's son, General of the New Jersey militia Isaiah Shinn, later owned the house, but built another house across the street in 1790. Both of these houses are located in the local Woodstown Historic District along with another nearby house, the William Shinn House. Isaiah's grandson, painter Everett Shinn was raised in Woodstown but never lived in the Joseph Shinn House.

== See also ==
- National Register of Historic Places listings in Salem County, New Jersey
- List of the oldest buildings in New Jersey
