= Seven Stars Tavern =

Seven Stars Tavern may refer to:

- Seven Stars Tavern, MD, Baltimore, the founding place of the (U.S.) Independent Order of Odd Fellows
- Seven Stars Tavern, NJ, Woodstown, on the (U.S.) National Register of Historic Places
