= Zaccheus Dunn House =

Historic house in New Jersey, United States

- U.S. National Register of Historic Places
- New Jersey Register of Historic Places
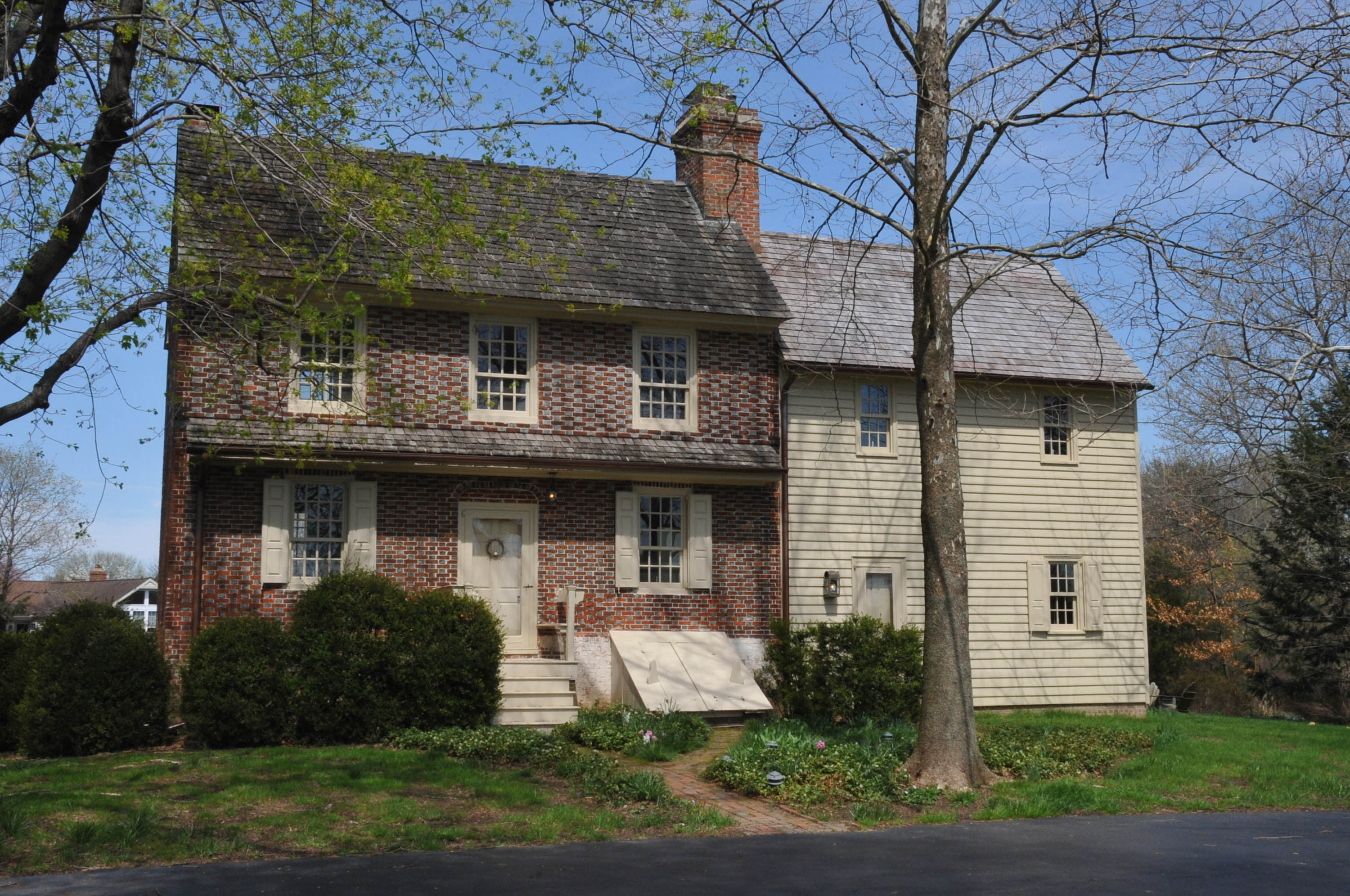

- Location within Salem County, New Jersey Location within New Jersey Location within the United States
- Nearest city: Woodstown, New Jersey
- Coordinates: 39°37′55″N 75°19′32″W
- Area: less than one acre
- Built: 1743
- NRHP reference No.: 77000905
- NJRHP No.: 2453

Significant dates
- Added to NRHP: August 10, 1977
- Designated NJRHP: November 10, 1975

Zaccheus Dunn House is located in Woodstown, Salem County, New Jersey, United States. The house was built in 1743 and was added to the National Register of Historic Places on August 10, 1977.

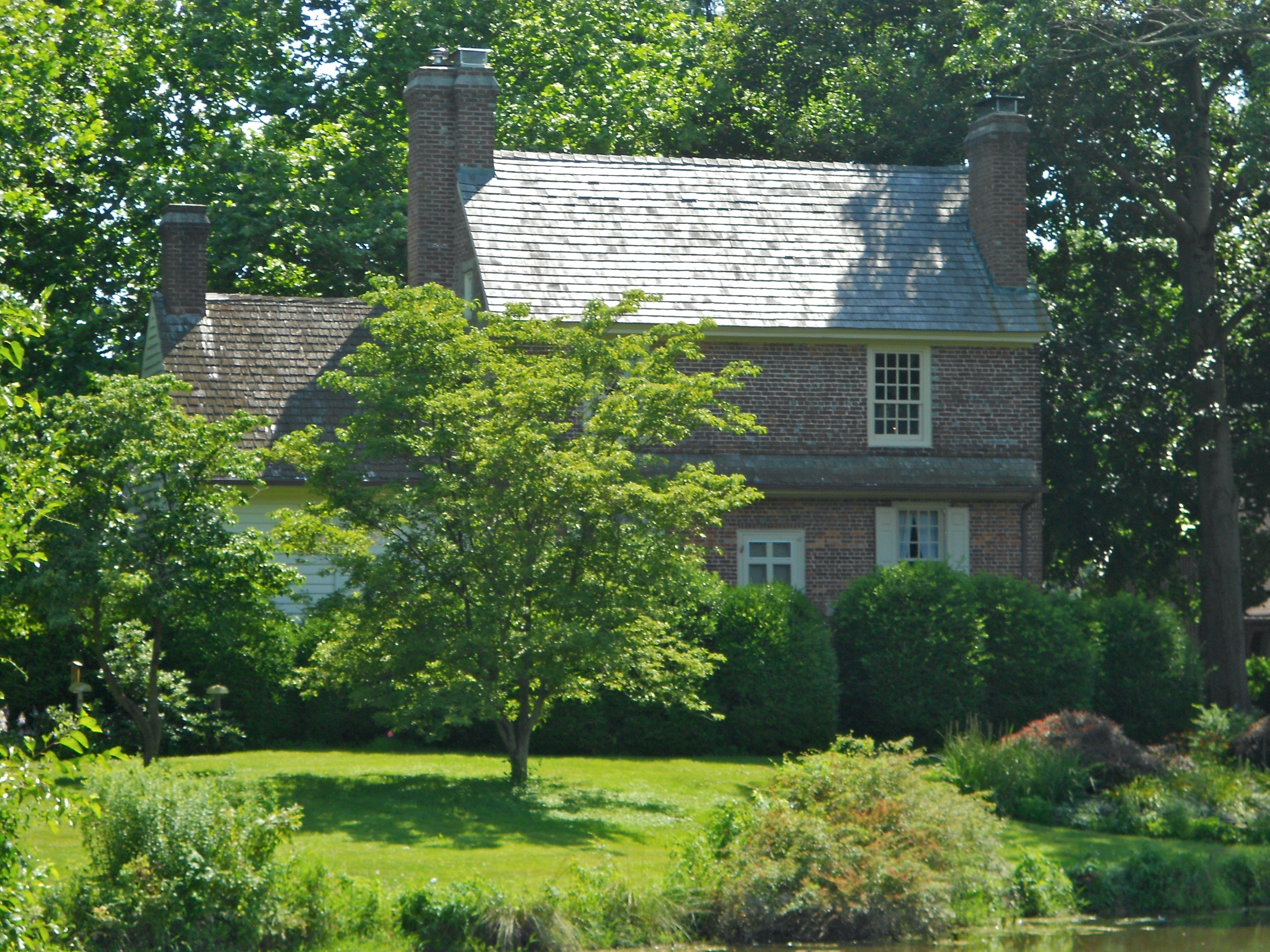
Back of the house

== See also ==
- National Register of Historic Places listings in Salem County, New Jersey
