= James and Mary Lawson House =

Historic house in New Jersey, United States

- U.S. National Register of Historic Places
- New Jersey Register of Historic Places
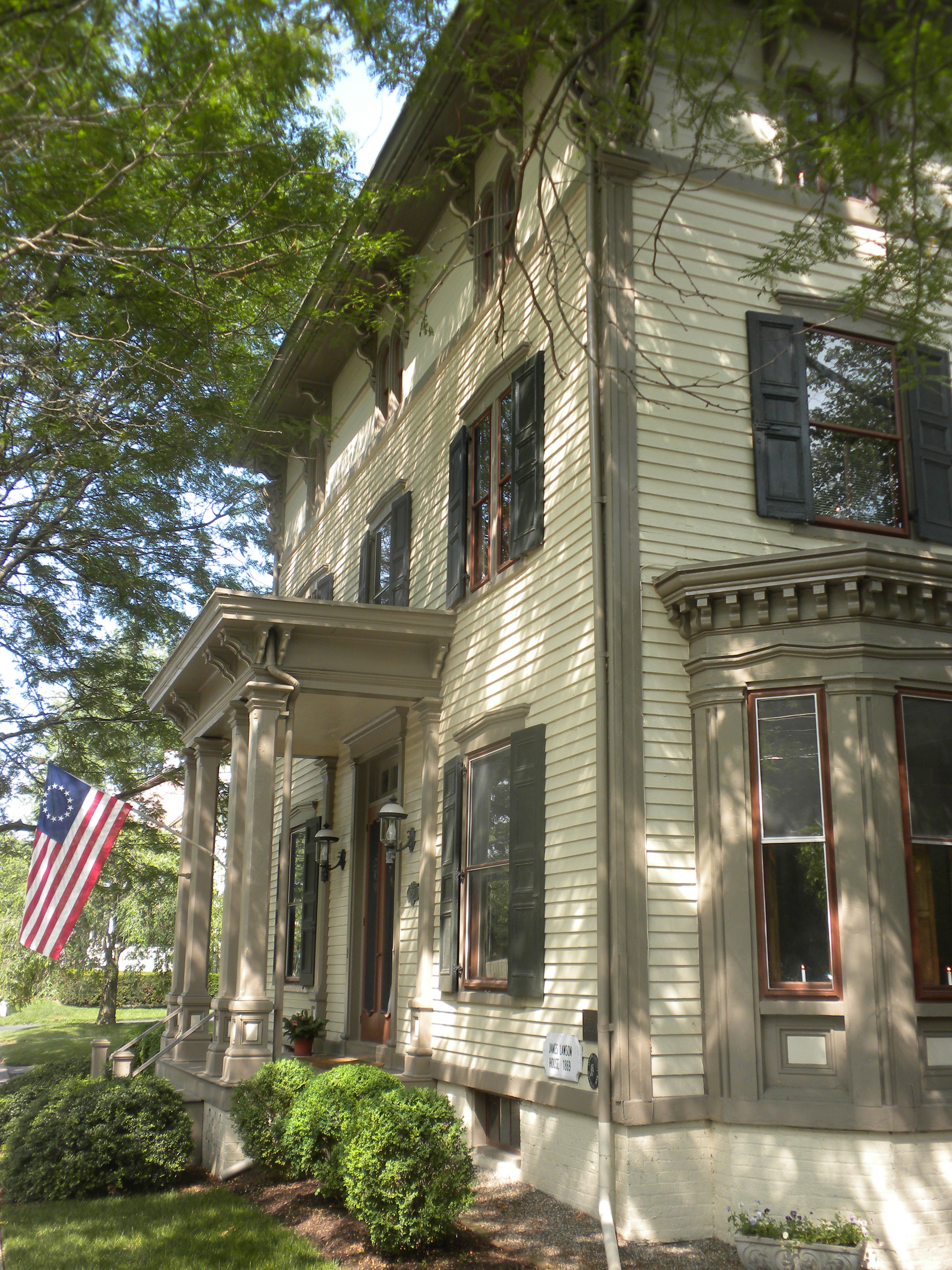

- Location within Salem County, New Jersey Location within New Jersey Location within the United States
- Location: 209 North Main Street, Woodstown, New Jersey
- Coordinates: 39°39′20″N 75°19′39″W
- Built: 1869
- Architectural style: Italianate
- NRHP reference No.: 01000042
- NJRHP No.: 3794

Significant dates
- Added to NRHP: February 16, 2001
- Designated NJRHP: December 1, 2000

The James and Mary Lawson House is located at 209 North Main Street in Woodstown of Salem County, New Jersey, United States. The house was built in 1869 and was added to the National Register of Historic Places on February 16, 2001, for its significance in architecture.

== History and description ==
James Dennis Lawson, a local farmer and merchant, built the house in 1869. His wife, Mary Davis Pancoast, was from a wealthy Quaker family. The three-story frame house is built with Italianate style, a cubical Italian villa. Additions to the house were built after 1909 and 1942.

== See also ==
- National Register of Historic Places listings in Salem County, New Jersey
