= Ashley Hall (Charleston, South Carolina) =

Location
- Charleston, South Carolina; United States; 32°47′11″N 79°56′41″W

Information
- Type: Private, all-girls day school
- Motto: Possunt Quae Volunt (Girls who have the will have the ability)
- Founded: 1909
- Head of school: Anne T. Weston
- Faculty: 80
- Grades: Primary2 through 12
- Enrollment: Approximately 700
- Campus size: 4.5 acres (1.8 ha)
- Campus type: Urban
- Colors: Purple and white
- Nickname: Panthers
- Yearbook: Spiral
- Website: Official website

Ashley Hall is an all-girls private school in Charleston, South Carolina. It enrolls students in kindergarten through grade 12 with a co-educational pre-k program. It was founded in 1909 by Mary Vardrine McBee, who headed the institution for many years. It is the only all-girls' independent private school in South Carolina. The school motto is Possunt Quae Volunt or "Girls who have the will have the ability."

Ashley Hall's campus features numerous historic properties: James Nicholson House (McBee House), 172 Rutledge Avenue (c.1816-1820); Warren Street House, 89 Warren Street (c.1823); The Elizabeth Rivers Lewine ’54 House for Global Studies, 79 Rutledge Avenue (c.1876); and the Muti House for Performing Arts, 159 Rutledge Avenue (c. 1845).

== History ==
In Spring 1909, Mary Vardrine McBee bought the James Nicholson House at 172 Rutledge Avenue to found an independent college preparatory school for girls. She named the school Ashley Hall. During her 40-year tenure, the school grew from just 46 students from grades 10 to 12 to a much larger student body in lower, middle, and upper schools.

McBee established the Alumnae Association, instilled many of the traditions that still exist today, and acquired facilities that served as the foundation. Her school included the McBee House (now so named) and surrounding grounds, an indoor swimming pool, the "Old Gym" (Burges auditorium), kitchen and dining room, the Headmistress House, and faculty apartments across the street from Ashley Hall.

In 1948, the Ashley Hall Foundation was established. The foundation purchased Ashley Hall from McBee in 1949, the year of her retirement. The goundation's first move was to appoint William Piper as head of school, and he served from 1949 to 1954.

Caroline Pardue joined Ashley Hall in 1950 as the academic head of the Upper School and teacher of history. She was appointed headmistress in 1954 and served in this capacity until 1978. Her many accomplishments include the establishment of Pardue, Lane and Jenkins Halls to officially house classrooms for the lower, middle, and upper schools, the construction of Davies Auditorium, and the incorporation of a kindergarten for boys and girls. It was during her leadership that the school shifted its student base, eliminating boarding opportunities to focus on local students. In 1976, the school graduated its first African-American student. Upon Pardue's retirement, Marian Bell Leland assumed the role of headmistress from 1979 to 1984. Leland created the Ashley Hall Fund, which supported the construction of the school's gymnasium.

Margaret C. MacDonald led Ashley Hall from 1985 to 2004. She is credited for elevating the school's academic standards. She established financial aid programs and additional scholarships, initiated the school's first campus master plan, developed teaching excellence awards, expanded the aquatics and admissions departments, and added to the physical property of the school. MacDonald, along with the school's board of trustees, helped create the 2003–2008 Strategic Plan. This comprehensive blueprint outlines the future goals of the school as they relate to academics, student and faculty recruitment, and facilities enhancements.

== School publications ==
Student publications

- Spiral – school yearbook
- Cerberus – Upper School literary magazine

Development publications

- Perspectives – official school magazine, distributed to alumni, families, students and faculty

== Athletics ==
Ashley Hall participates in the South Carolina Independent School Association.

The school is famed for its excellence in varsity volleyball and tennis teams.

- Fall sports:
  - Cross country (SCISA Class AAA State Champions 2010, 2015, 2016, and 2020)
  - Golf
  - Swimming
  - Tennis (SCISA Class AAA State Champions 2016, 2018, 2019, and 2020)
  - Volleyball (SCISA Class AAA State Champions 2007, 2008, 2009, 2018)
- Winter sports:
  - Basketball
- Spring sports:
  - Archery
  - Sailing
  - Soccer
  - Lacrosse
  - Equestrian
  - Track (SCISA Class AAA State Champions 2013, 2014)

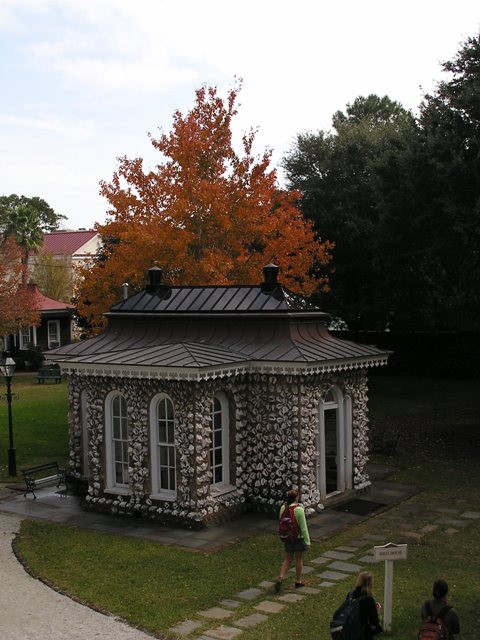
The Shell House

== Notable alumnae ==
- Madeleine L'Engle (Class of 1936), author
- Barbara Bush (Class of 1943, née Pierce), former First Lady of the United States
- Nancy Stevenson (Class of 1945, née Backer), lieutenant governor of South Carolina
- Nancy Friday (Class of 1951), author
- Alexandra Ripley (Class of 1951, née Braid), author
- Harriet McDougal Rigney (Class of 1956, née Popham), editor
- Josephine Humphreys (Class of 1963), author
- D'Anna Fortunato (Class of 1963), mezzo-soprano
- Kate Jackson, (1965) actress
- Martha Rivers Ingram, business leader, philanthropist
- Mena Suvari, actress
- Lisa Sanders (Class of 1973), physician, medical author, and journalist
- Frederica Mathewes-Green, Orthodox Christian author
- Emma Navarro, professional tennis player
