= Philip Fries House =

- U.S. National Register of Historic Places
- New Jersey Register of Historic Places
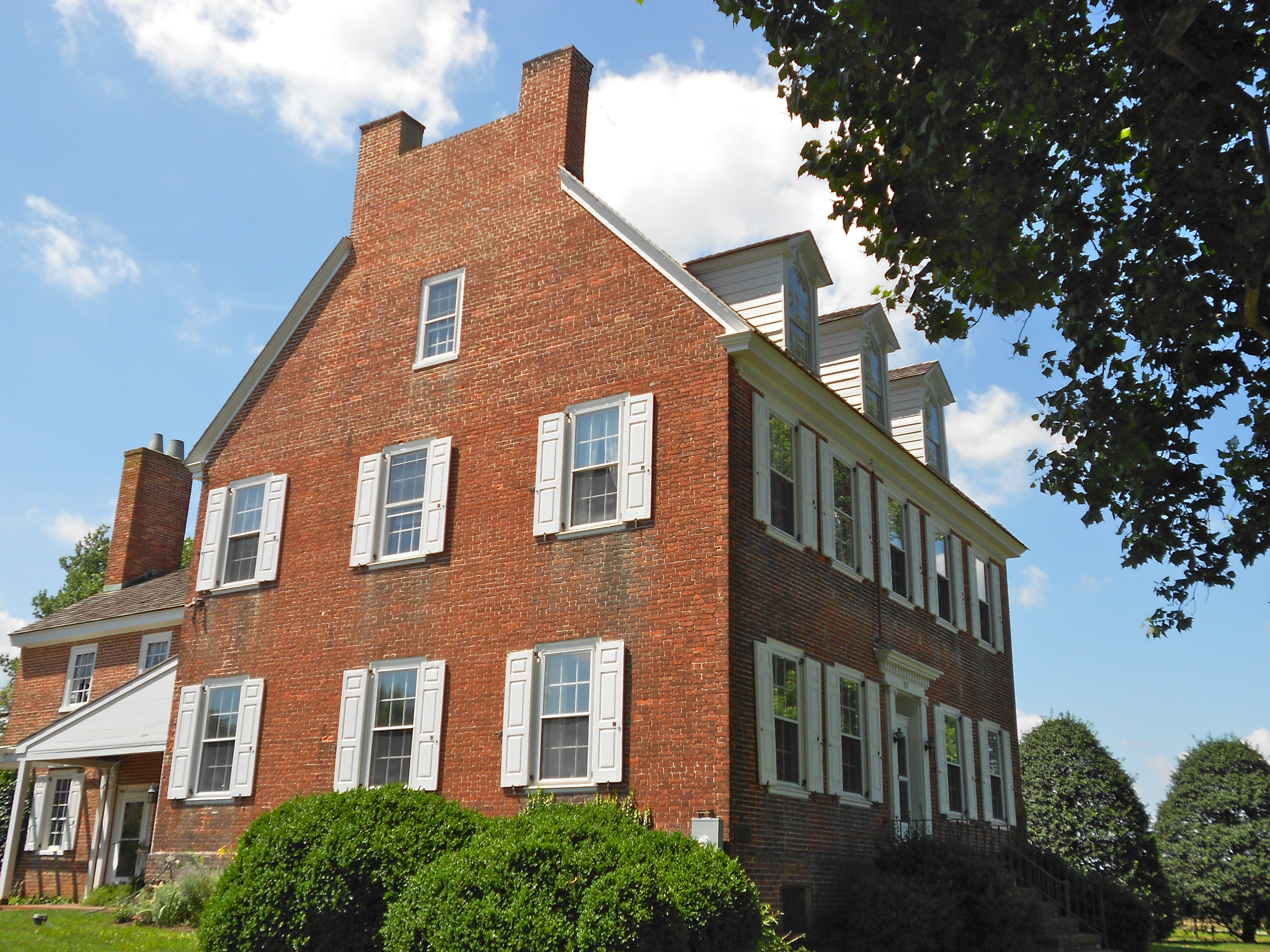

- Location within Salem County, New Jersey Location within New Jersey Location within the United States
- Location: Cohansey-Daretown Road north of Alloway-Friesburg Road; Friesburg, New Jersey
- Coordinates: 39°32′23″N 75°17′32″W
- Area: 2.2 acres (0.89 ha)
- Built: 1808
- Architectural style: Federal, Vernacular barn
- NRHP reference No.: 90001451
- NJRHP No.: 2429

Significant dates
- Added to NRHP: September 28, 1990
- Designated NJRHP: August 10, 1990

The Philip Fries House is a historic house located along Cohansey-Daretown Road in the Friesburg section of Alloway Township in Salem County, New Jersey. The Federal brick house, built in 1808, and associated barn were added to the National Register of Historic Places on September 28, 1990, for significance in architecture.

== History and description ==
In 1739, Jacob Fries gave land for the Emanuel Lutheran Church, helping to establish the community now known as Friesburg. In 1808, his son, Philip Fries, built this two and one-half story brick house with Federal architecture across the street from the church. The interior features eight fireplaces with detailed woodwork. The house was restored in the 1960s by architects G. Edwin Brumbaugh and Albert F. Ruthrauff.

== See also ==
- National Register of Historic Places listings in Salem County, New Jersey
