= Thomas Leaming House =

Historic house in New Jersey, United States

- U.S. National Register of Historic Places
- New Jersey Register of Historic Places
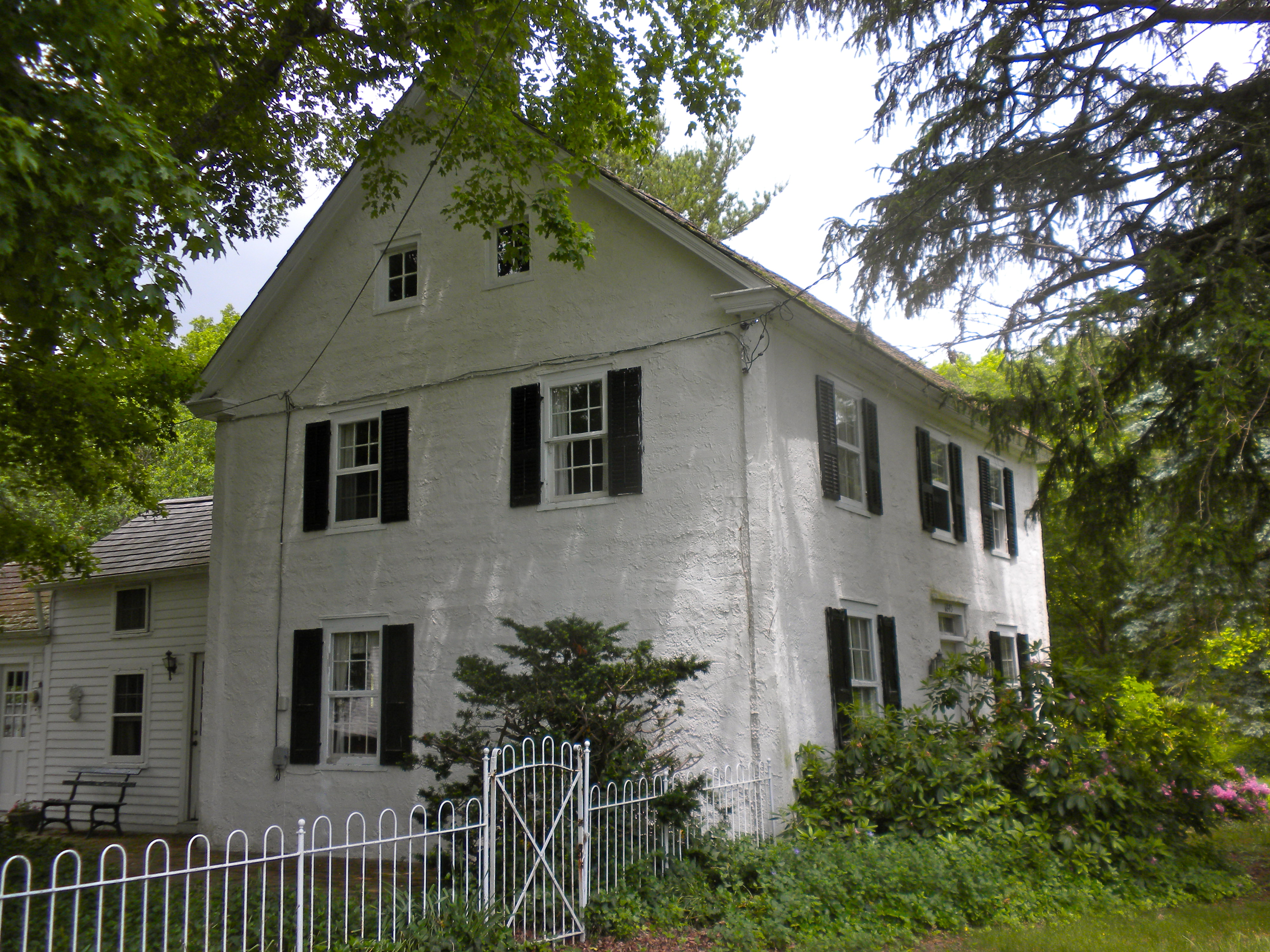
- Thomas Leaming House in 2010.

- Location within Cape May County, New Jersey Location within New Jersey Location within the United States
- Location: 1845 US 9 North, Middle Township, New Jersey
- Coordinates: 39°8′30″N 74°46′1″W
- Area: 30 acres (12 ha)
- Built: 1706
- Architectural style: Postmedieval English
- NRHP reference No.: 97000801
- NJRHP No.: 3057

Significant dates
- Added to NRHP: August 1, 1997
- Designated NJRHP: June 3, 1997

Thomas Leaming House is located in Middle Township, Cape May County, New Jersey, United States. The house was built in 1706 and was added to the National Register of Historic Places on August 1, 1997.

Leaming was a member of the fifth session (June–August 1776) of the Provincial Congress of New Jersey which ordered the arrest of the colony's last royal governor William Franklin, approved the Declaration of Independence and wrote New Jersey's first state constitution (1776).

== See also ==
- National Register of Historic Places listings in Cape May County, New Jersey
