= Richard Brick House =

Historic house in New Jersey, United States

- U.S. National Register of Historic Places
- New Jersey Register of Historic Places
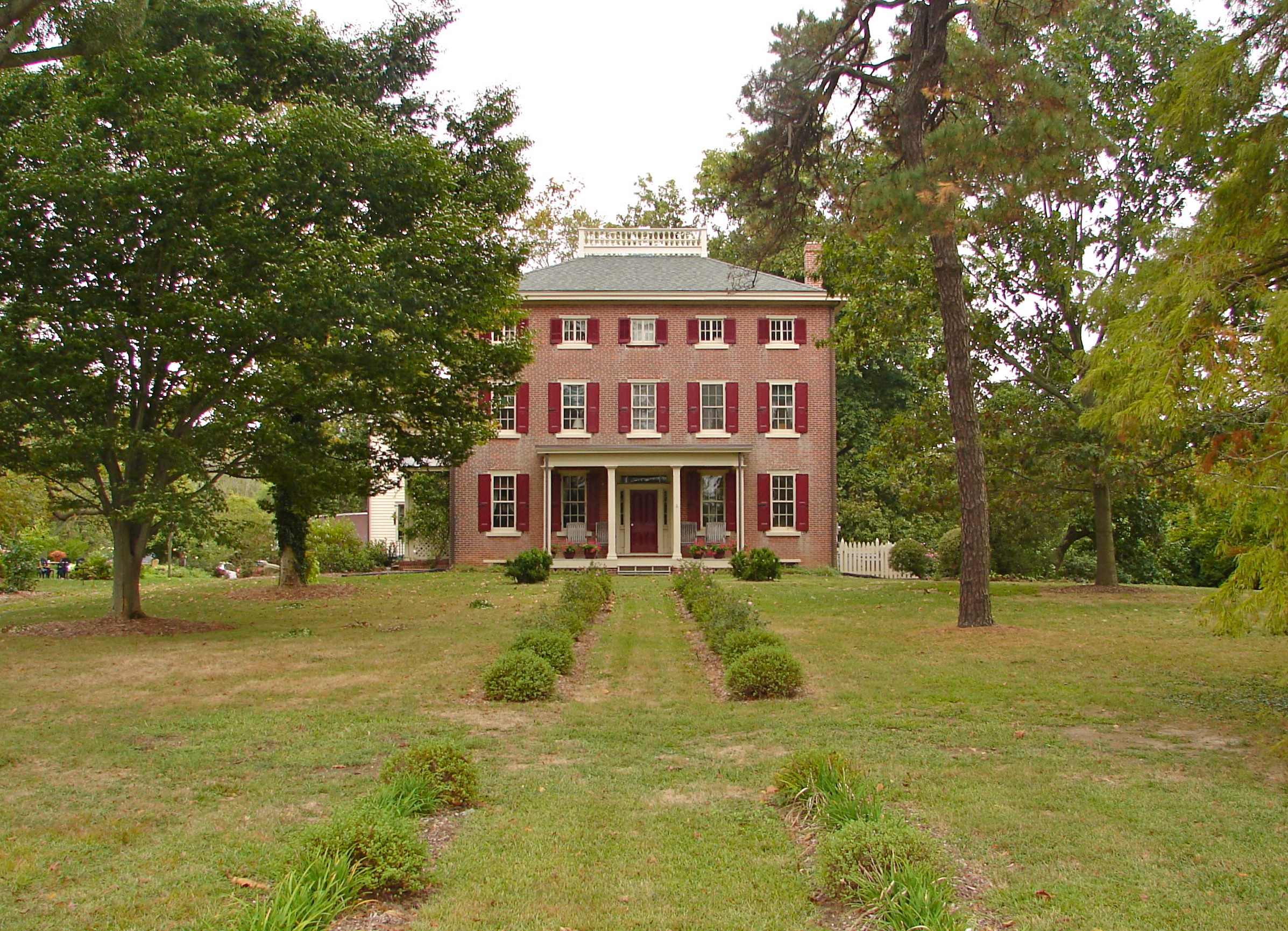

- Location within Salem County, New Jersey Location within New Jersey Location within the United States
- Nearest city: Salem, New Jersey
- Coordinates: 39°36′44″N 75°22′56″W
- Area: 1 acre (0.40 ha)
- Built: 1750
- NRHP reference No.: 76001183
- NJRHP No.: 2435

Significant dates
- Added to NRHP: May 13, 1976
- Designated NJRHP: November 12, 1975

Richard Brick House is located in Salem, Salem County, New Jersey, United States. The house was built in 1750 and was added to the National Register of Historic Places on May 13, 1976.

== See also ==
- National Register of Historic Places listings in Salem County, New Jersey
