= William and Margaret Mecum House =

Historic house in New Jersey, United States

- U.S. National Register of Historic Places
- New Jersey Register of Historic Places
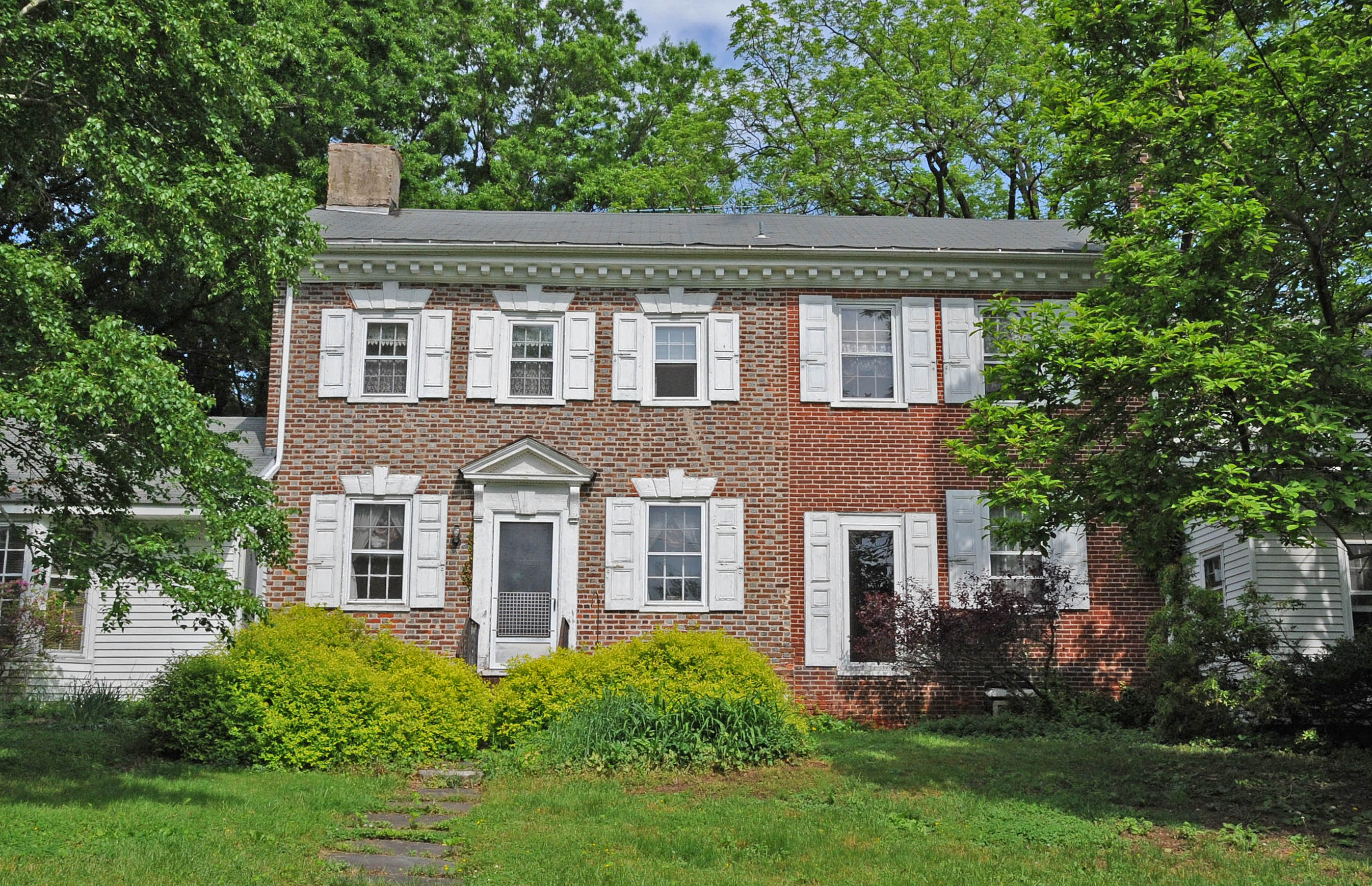

- Location within Salem County, New Jersey Location within New Jersey Location within the United States
- Location: 168 Lighthouse Road, Pennsville Township, New Jersey
- Coordinates: 39°36′59.3″N 75°31′25″W
- Area: 20.1 acres (8.1 ha)
- Built: 1737
- Architectural style: Georgian
- MPS: Traditional Patterned Brickwork Buildings in New Jersey
- NRHP reference No.: 100002172
- NJRHP No.: 5605

Significant dates
- Added to NRHP: March 5, 2018
- Designated NJRHP: January 11, 2018

The William and Margaret Mecum House is located at 168 Lighthouse Road in Pennsville Township of Salem County, New Jersey, United States. Built in 1737, the house was added to the National Register of Historic Places on March 5, 2018, for its significance in architecture. The house is part of the Traditional Patterned Brickwork Buildings in New Jersey Multiple Property Submission (MPS).

== History and description ==
William Mecum had the original section of the house built in 1737. It was expanded c. 1770 by his son and has the initials WM and the date 1737 in the gable brickwork. The two-story house uses Flemish bond brickwork and features Georgian architecture. The farm was reduced in size in the early 1970s when the United States Fish and Wildlife Service bought 250 acres (100 ha) for the Supawna Meadows National Wildlife Refuge.

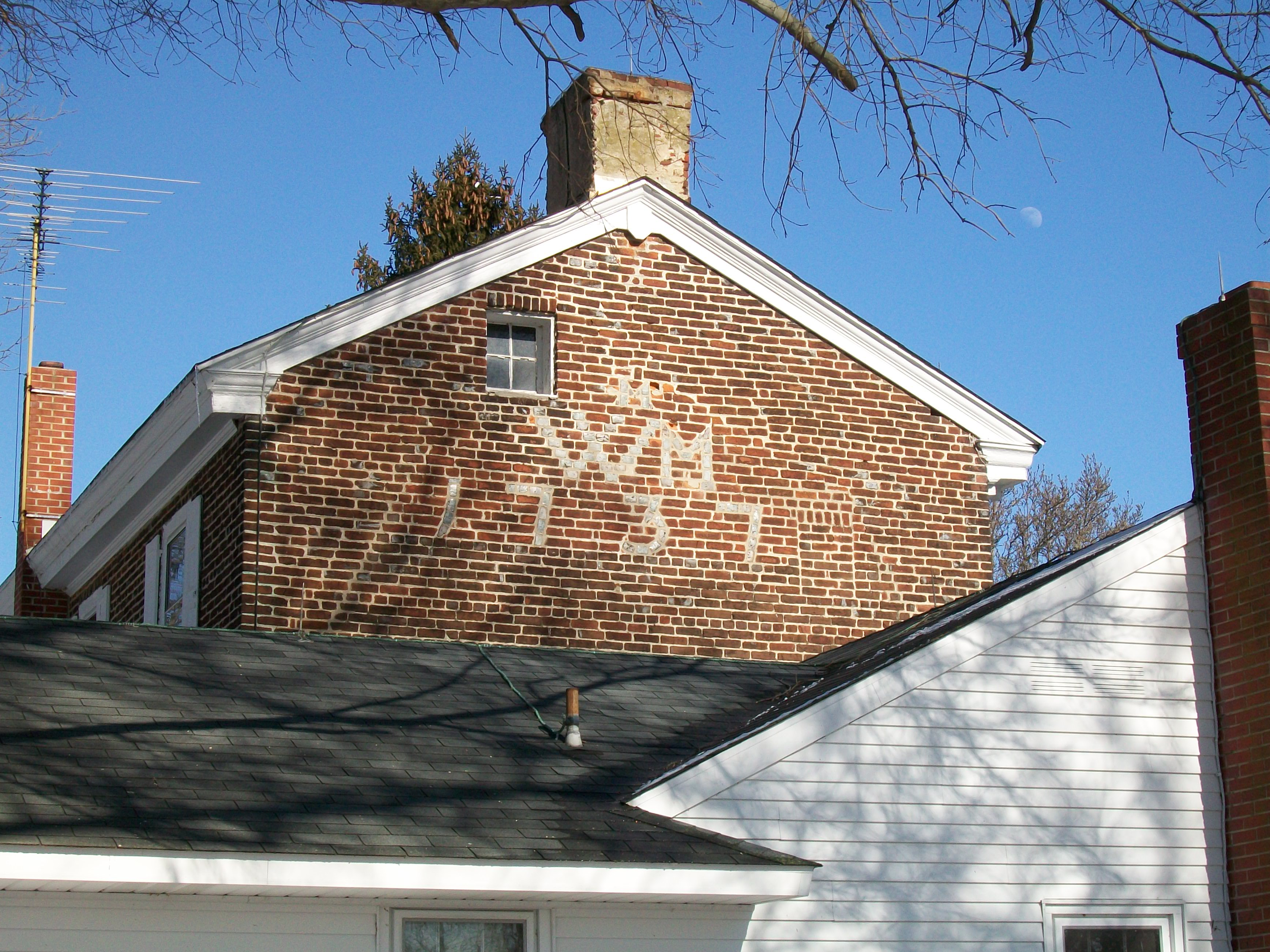
Gable brickwork with initials and date

== See also ==
- National Register of Historic Places listings in Salem County, New Jersey
- List of the oldest buildings in New Jersey
