= Broadway Historic District (Salem, New Jersey) =

Historic district in New Jersey, United States

- U.S. National Register of Historic Places
- U.S. Historic district
- New Jersey Register of Historic Places
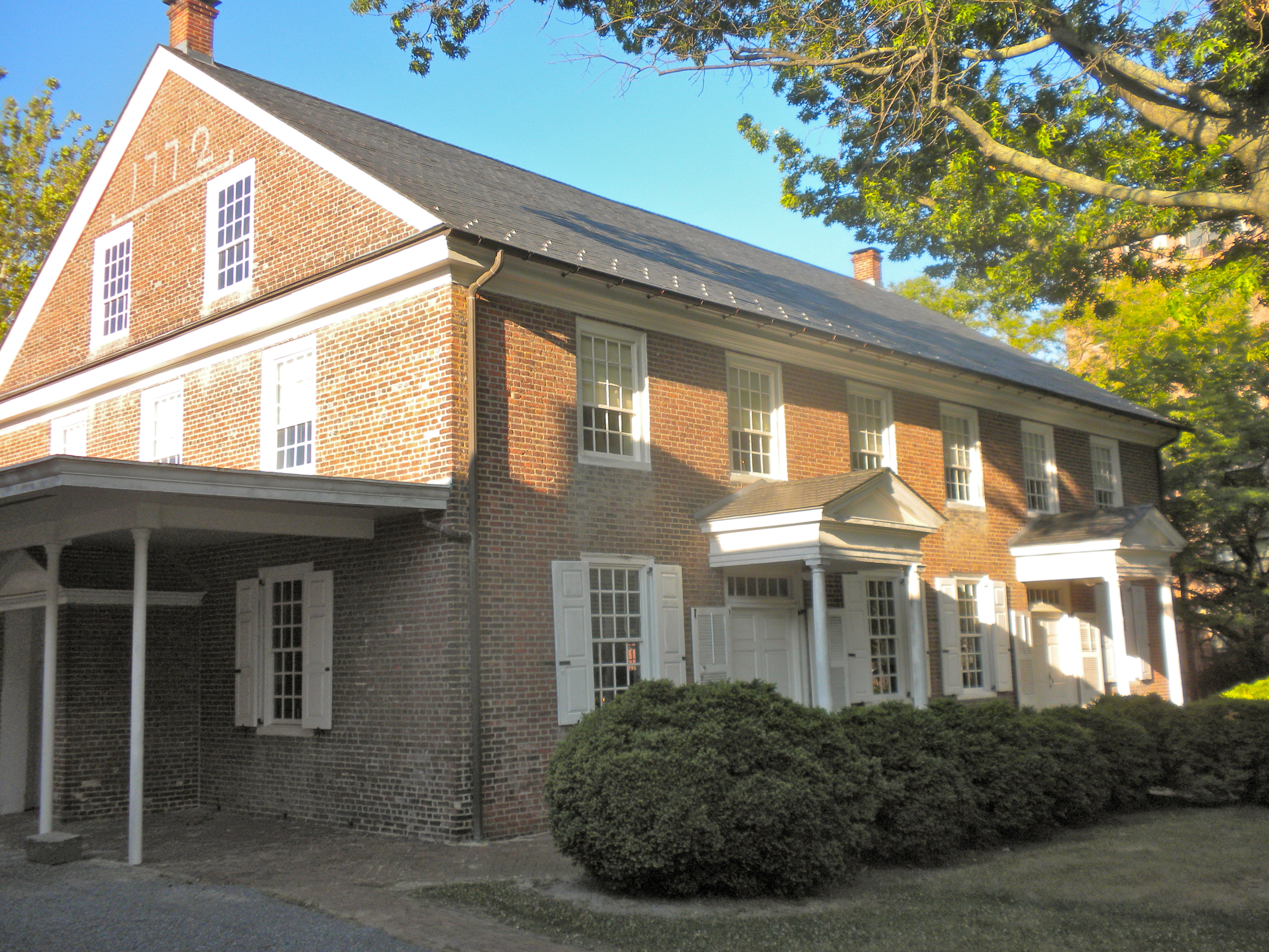
- The Salem Friends Meeting House

- Location within Salem County, New Jersey Location within New Jersey Location within the United States
- Location: Broadway from Front to Yorke Streets, Salem, New Jersey
- Coordinates: 39°34′11″N 75°28′3″W
- Area: 75 acres (30 ha)
- Architectural style: Greek Revival, Federal, Delaware Valley Colonial
- NRHP reference No.: 92000098
- NJRHP No.: 2448

Significant dates
- Added to NRHP: March 5, 1992
- Designated NJRHP: December 9, 1991

Broadway Historic District is located in Salem, Salem County, New Jersey, United States. The district was added to the National Register of Historic Places on March 5, 1992.

== See also ==
- National Register of Historic Places listings in Salem County, New Jersey
