= Benjamin Holme's House =

Historic house in New Jersey, United States

- U.S. National Register of Historic Places
- New Jersey Register of Historic Places
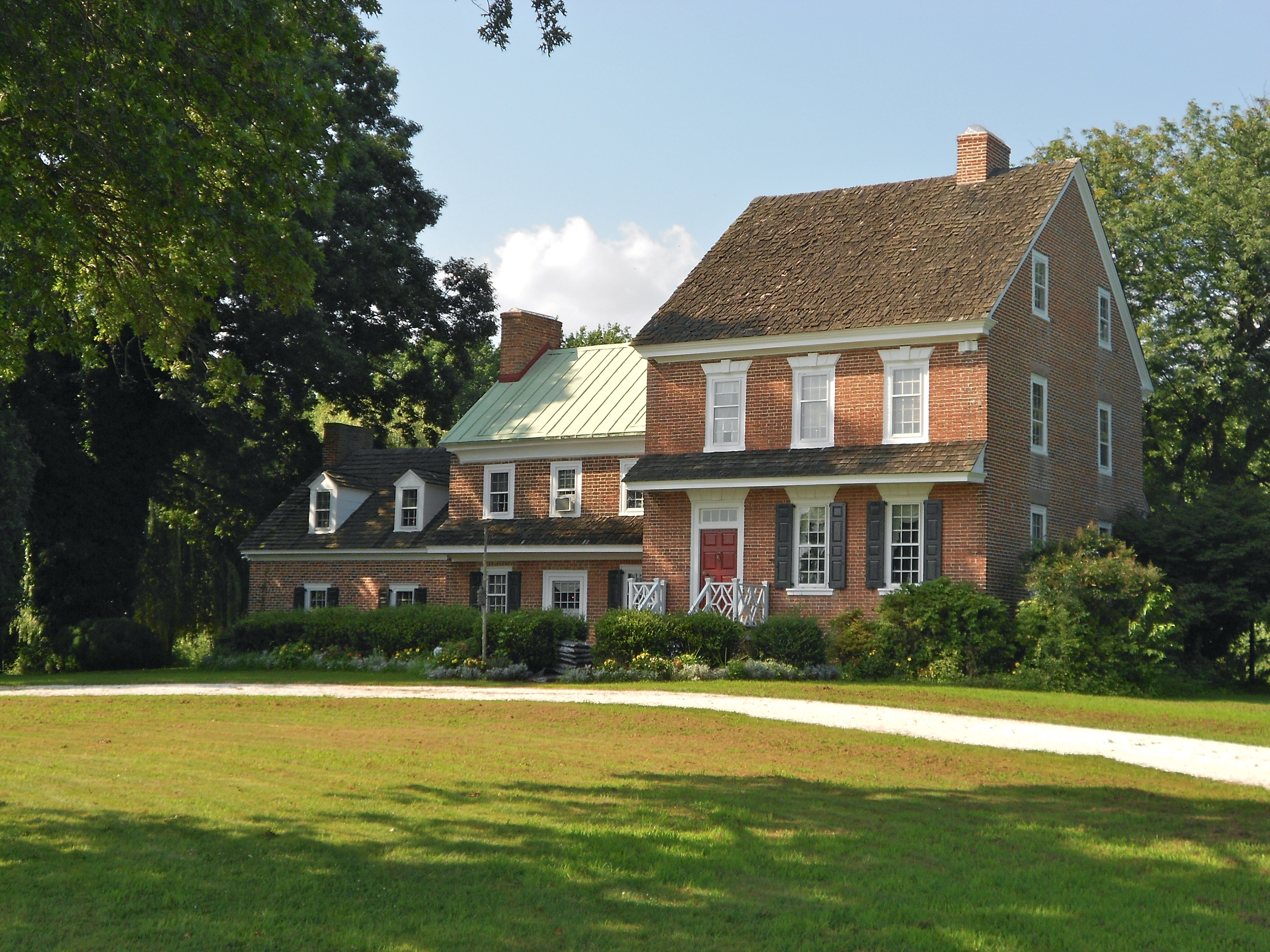

- Location within Salem County, New Jersey Location within New Jersey Location within the United States
- Location: Fort Elfsborg-Hancock's Bridge Road, Elsinboro Township, New Jersey
- Coordinates: 39°32′43″N 75°30′46″W
- Area: 180 acres (73 ha)
- Built: c. 1729, c. 1784
- Architectural style: Jersey Georgian
- NRHP reference No.: 78001794
- NJRHP No.: 2431

Significant dates
- Added to NRHP: August 31, 1978
- Designated NJRHP: December 19, 1977

Benjamin Holme's House, also known as Holmeland, is located on Fort Elfsborg-Hancock's Bridge Road in Elsinboro Township near Salem in Salem County, New Jersey, United States. The oldest part of the house was built c. 1729. The house was added to the National Register of Historic Places on August 31, 1978, for its significance in architecture, government, and military history.

== History and description ==
The original property expanded over 1,600 acres, with a ferry running to New Castle, Delaware. It now is 180 acres (73 ha). The original house was built c. 1729, but was looted and burned by the British during the American Revolutionary War. It was later rebuilt by Colonel Benjamin Holme, adding the east section of the house c. 1784. Holme had fought in the Battle of Quinton's Bridge. The two and one-half story brick house features Jersey Georgian architecture.

== See also ==
- National Register of Historic Places listings in Salem County, New Jersey
