= Hedge–Carpenter–Thompson Historic District =

Historic house in New Jersey, United States

- U.S. National Register of Historic Places
- U.S. Historic district
- New Jersey Register of Historic Places
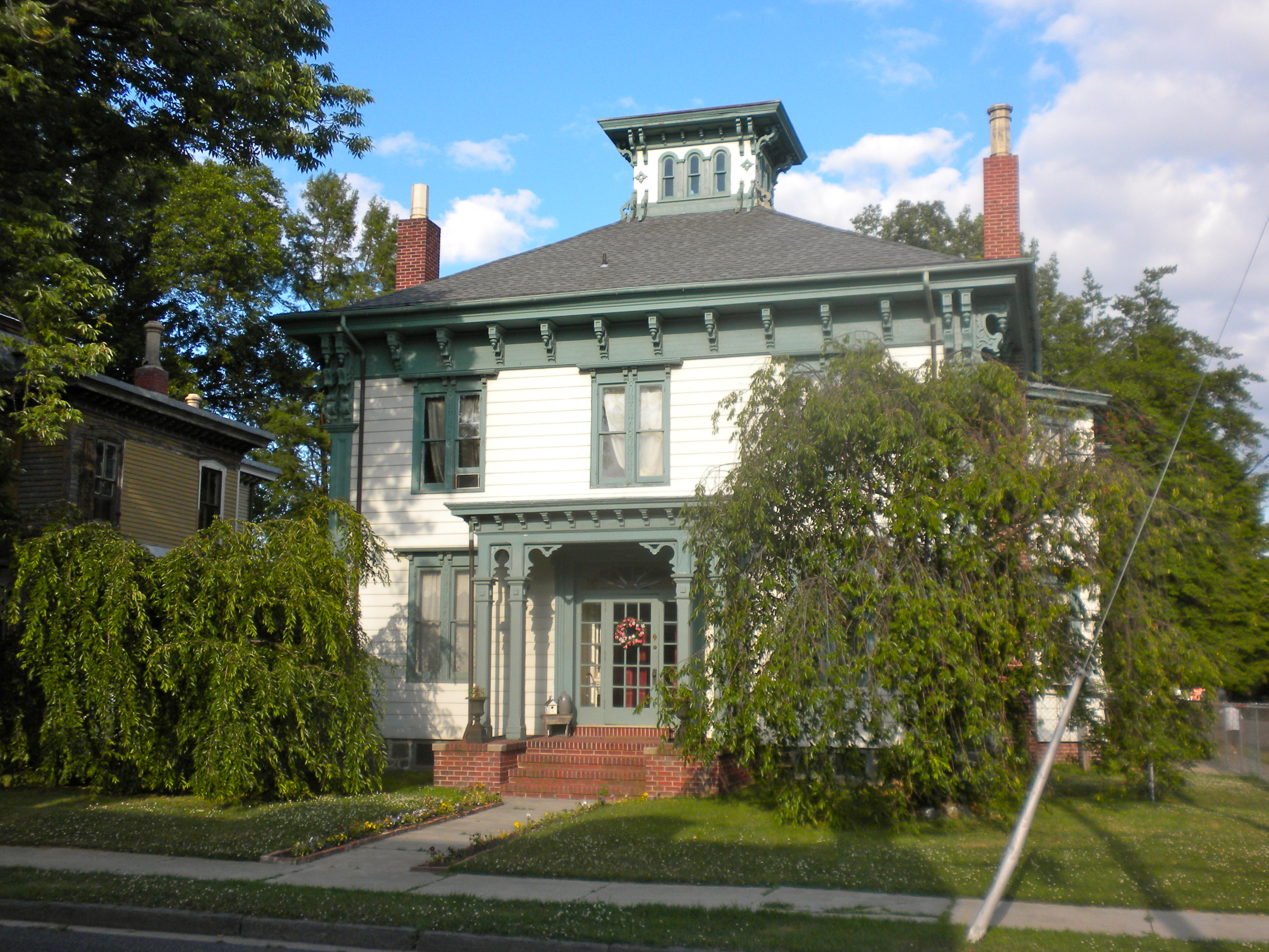

- Location within Salem County, New Jersey Location within New Jersey Location within the United States
- Location: Bounded by Hedge, Thompson, South Third Streets and Oak Street Alley, Salem, New Jersey
- Coordinates: 39°34′15″N 75°28′32″W
- Area: 25 acres (10 ha)
- Architectural style: Late 19th And Early 20th Century American Movements, Late Victorian, et al.
- NRHP reference No.: 01000236
- NJRHP No.: 3752

Significant dates
- Added to NRHP: March 26, 2001
- Designated NJRHP: January 25, 2001

Hedge–Carpenter–Thompson Historic District is located in Salem, Salem County, New Jersey, United States. The district was added to the National Register of Historic Places on March 26, 2001.

== See also ==
- National Register of Historic Places listings in Salem County, New Jersey
