= Seven Stars Tavern (New Jersey) =

- U.S. National Register of Historic Places
- New Jersey Register of Historic Places
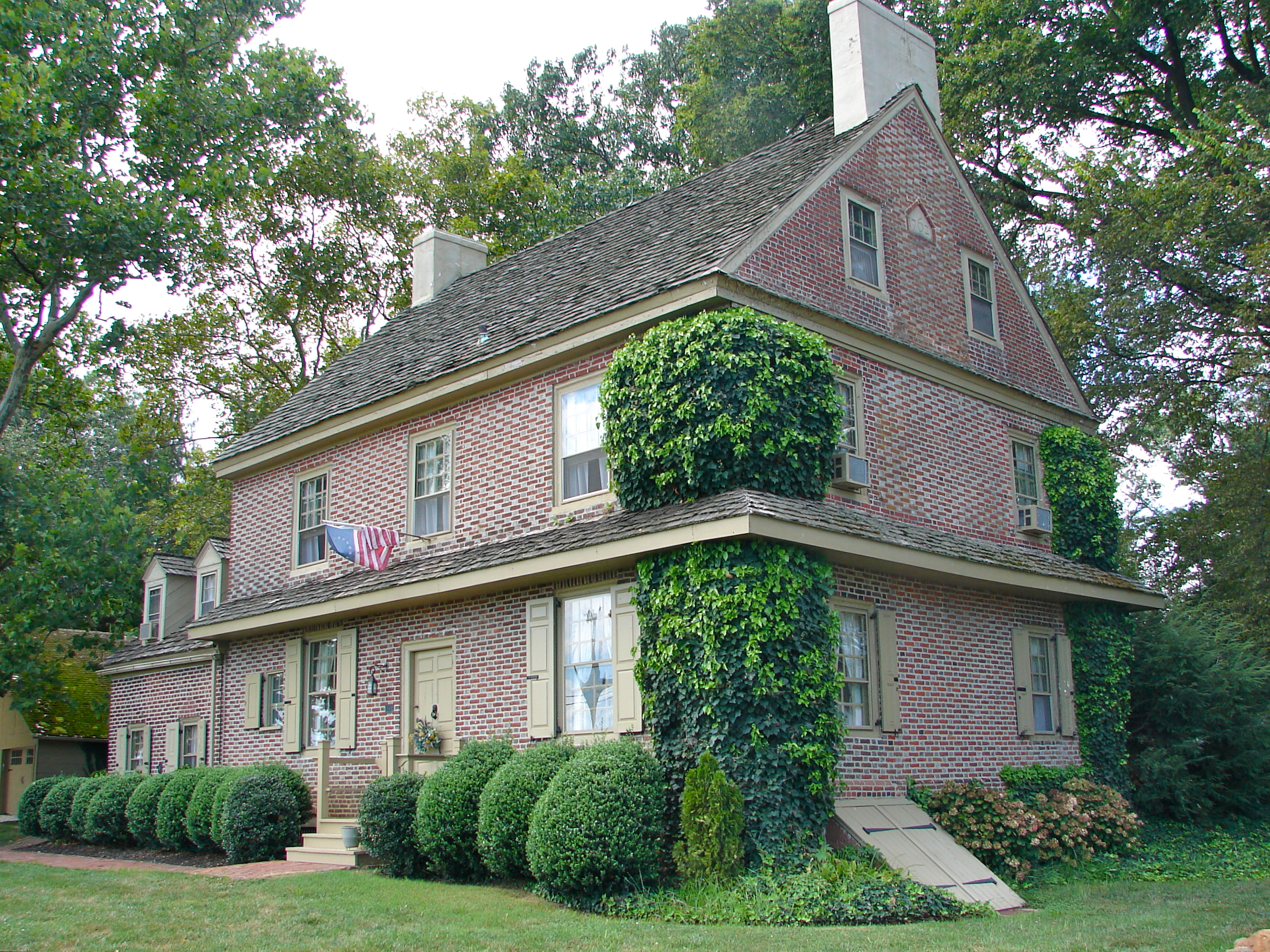

- Location within Salem County, New Jersey Location within New Jersey Location within the United States
- Location: Sharptown-Swedesboro Road and Woodstown-Auburn Road
- Nearest city: Woodstown, New Jersey
- Coordinates: 39°41′8″N 75°20′23″W
- Area: 4.5 acres (1.8 ha)
- Built: 1762
- NRHP reference No.: 76001184
- NJRHP No.: 3440

Significant dates
- Added to NRHP: May 17, 1976
- Designated NJRHP: November 5, 1975

Seven Stars Tavern is a historic building located at the junction of Sharptown-Swedesboro Road and Woodstown-Auburn Road in Pilesgrove Township of Salem County, New Jersey and near Woodstown. The building was built in 1762 and was added to the National Register of Historic Places on May 17, 1976, for its significance in architecture, military, and social history. It is now a private residence.

== History ==
Peter Lauterbach built this two and one-half story brick building in 1762. It features Flemish bond patterned brickwork with the initials "P L E" and the date. The initials are from his name and his wife's, Elizabeth. It also has a date plaque on another side.

His son, John Louderback (note name change), lived in the tavern during the American Revolutionary War. In 1778, British forces raided the tavern in search of him.

== Legends ==
The tavern is also the focus of ghost stories. In Old Inns and Taverns in West Jersey, the author, Charles S. Boyer, states that "probably more ghost stories are woven around the old Seven Stars Tavern than any similar building in the state."

It is said to be haunted. In the early 20th century, the Stephens family lived there and experienced multiple sightings of paranormal activities, including: figures on horseback riding up to the tavern window - which once served as one of the nation's first "drive through" windows during the Revolutionary War times. On one occasion, an infant (Dorothy Stephens) was in a crib in a bedroom when a figure in a white gown bent down over her and appeared to be intent on picking her up. The child's sister (Elizabeth), returning from a night out with friends, saw the figure as she checked on the child and, when she called out, the figure disappeared. In the 1980s, a Philadelphia-based news team performed a live seance in the attic.

== See also ==
- National Register of Historic Places listings in Salem County, New Jersey
- List of the oldest buildings in New Jersey
