= Provincial Congress of New Jersey =

Type
- Type: Unicameral Provisional Revolutionary Government of Province of New Jersey

History
- Founded: May 23, 1775
- Disbanded: August 27, 1776
- Preceded by: British Royal governors
- Succeeded by: 1st Session of the New Jersey Legislature

Leadership
- President: Hendrick Fisher
- Secretary: Jonathan Dickinson Sergeant
- Assistant(s): William Paterson; Frederick Frelinghuysen

Meeting place
- Trenton, New Jersey

The Provincial Congress of New Jersey was a transitional governing body of the Province of New Jersey in the early part of the American Revolution. It first met in 1775 with representatives from all New Jersey's then-thirteen counties, to supersede the Royal Governor. In June 1776, this congress had authorized the preparation of a constitution, which was written within five days, adopted by the Provincial Congress, and accepted by the Continental Congress.

The Constitution of 1776 provided for a bicameral legislature consisting of a General Assembly with three members from each county (with the option for the Legislature at any time to reapportion "on the principles of more equal representation") and a legislative council with one member from each county. All state officials, including the governor, were to be appointed by the Legislature under this constitution. The Vice-President of Council would succeed the Governor, who served as the Council president, if a vacancy occurred in that office. The Provincial Congress ceased to function when the first session of the new Legislature convened on August 27, 1776, under the New Jersey State Constitution it had prepared.

== 1775 Sessions ==
The Provincial Congress met in late May, June and August in Trenton. During their sessions in the first week, they elected from their members: Hendrick Fisher as the body's President, Jonathan D. Sergeant as secretary, and William Paterson and Frederick Frelinghuysen as assistants. The members, or deputies of the Congress, were received at its first session on May 23, 1775.

== Members of the Provincial Congress ==
At Independence Hall in Philadelphia in 1776, three Provincial Congress deputies, Abraham Clark, John Hart, and Reverend John Witherspoon, signed the Declaration of Independence, becoming three of the nation's 53 Founding Fathers.

- X = Attended Session
- N = Elected but did not attend Session

Name of Deputy or Delegate	County	May–June 1775 (Trenton)	August 1775 (Trenton)	October 1775 (Trenton)	January–March 1776 (New Brunswick)	June–August 1776 (Burlington)
John Fell	Bergen	X	X	-	-	-
John Demarest	Bergen	X	X	X	X	X
Hendrick Kuyper	Bergen	X	X	-	-	-
Abraham Van Buskirk	Bergen	X	X	N	X	X
Edo Merselius	Bergen	X	X	-	-	-
Jacobus Post	Bergen	-	-	X	X	X
Jacob Quackenbush	Bergen	-	-	-	-	X
Daniel Isaac Brown	Bergen	-	-	-	-	X
Joseph Borden	Burlington	X	X	-	-	-
Isaac Pearson	Burlington	X	X	X	X	-
Colin Campbell	Burlington	X	X	-	-	-
Joseph Read	Burlington	X	-	-	-	-
Peter Tallman	Burlington	-	-	-	-	X
Thomas Reynolds	Burlington	-	-	-	-	X
Thomas Fennimore	Burlington	-	-	-	-	X
Charles Read	Burlington	-	-	-	-	X
Caleb Shreve	Burlington	-	-	-	-	X
John Pope	Burlington	X	X	X	X	-
Samuel How	Burlington	-	-	X	X	-
John Wood	Burlington	-	-	X	N	-
Joseph Newbold	Burlington	-	-	X	X	-
Jesse Hand	Cape-May	X	-	X	N	X
Elijah Hughs	Cape-May	-	X	N	X	X
Thomas Leaming, Jr.	Cape-May	-	-	-	-	X
Joseph Savage	Cape-May	-	-	-	-	X
Hugh Hathorn	Cape-May	-	-	-	-	X
Samuel Fithian	Cumberland	X	X	-	-	-
Jonathan Elmer	Cumberland	X	X	-	-	-
Thomas Ewing	Cumberland	X	X	-	-	-
Theophilius Elmer	Cumberland	-	-	X	X	X
Jonathan Ayars	Cumberland	-	-	X	X	X
Ephraim Harris	Cumberland	-	-	-	-	X
John Buck	Cumberland	-	-	-	-	X
Jonathan Bowen	Cumberland	-	-	-	-	X
Henry Garritse	Essex	X	X	-	-	-
Michael Vreeland	Essex	X	X	-	-	-
Robert Drummond	Essex	X	X	X	X	X
John Berry	Essex	X	-	-	-	-
William P. Smith	Essex	X	-	-	-	-
John Stiles	Essex	X	-	-	-	-
John Chetwood	Essex	X	X	-	-	-
Abraham Clark	Essex	X	-	X	X	X
Elias Boudinot	Essex	X	X	-	-	-
Stephen Crane	Essex	-	-	-	-	X
Isaac Ogden	Essex	X	X	-	-	-
Philip van Cortlandt	Essex	X	X	-	-	-
Betheul Pierson	Essex	X	X	-	-	-
Caleb Camp	Essex	X	X	X	X	X
Samuel Potter	Essex	-	-	X	X	-
Lewis Ogden	Essex	-	-	X	X	X
John Cooper	Gloucester	X	-	X	N	X
Elijah Clark	Gloucester	X	X	X	N	X
John Sparks	Gloucester	X	X	-	-	X
Joseph Hugg	Gloucester	-	X	-	-	X
Joseph Ellis	Gloucester	-	X	X	X	X
Thomas Clark	Gloucester	-	-	X	N	-
Richard Somers	Gloucester	-	-	X	N	-
Samuel Tucker	Hunterdon	X	X	X	X	X
John Mehelm	Hunterdon	X	X	X	X	X
John Hart	Hunterdon	X	X	X	X	X
John Stout	Hunterdon	X	X	-	-	-
Jasper Smith	Hunterdon	X	X	-	-	-
Thomas Lowry	Hunterdon	X	X	-	-	-
Charles Stewart	Hunterdon	X	X	X	X	-
Daniel Hunt	Hunterdon	X	X	-	-	-
Ralph Hart	Hunterdon	X	X	-	-	-
Jacob Jennings	Hunterdon	X	-	-	-	-
Richard Stevens	Hunterdon	X	X	-	-	-
John Stevens, Jr.	Hunterdon	X	X	-	-	-
Thomas Stout	Hunterdon	X	X	-	-	-
Thomas Jones	Hunterdon	X	X	-	-	-
John Basset	Hunterdon	X	-	-	-	-
Abraham Bonnell	Hunterdon	-	X	-	-	-
Joseph Beavers	Hunterdon	-	X	-	-	-
Augustine Stevenson	Hunterdon	-	-	X	N	-
Philemon Dickinson	Hunterdon	-	-	-	-	X
John Allen	Hunterdon	-	-	-	-	X
John Combs	Middlesex	-	-	-	-	X
Moses Bloomfield	Middlesex	-	-	-	-	X
Nathaniel Heard	Middlesex	X	X	-	-	-
William Smith	Middlesex	X	X	-	-	-
John Dunn	Middlesex	X	X	-	-	X
John Lloyd	Middlesex	X	X	-	-	-
Azariah Dunham	Middlesex	X	X	X	X	-
John Schurman	Middlesex	X	X	-	-	-
John Wetherill	Middlesex	X	X	-	X	X
David Williamson	Middlesex	X	-	-	-	-
Jonathan Baldwin	Middlesex	X	X	-	-	-
Jonathan Deare	Middlesex	X	X	-	-	-
Lucas Schenck	Middlesex	-	X	-	-	-
John Dennis	Middlesex	-	-	X	X	-
Edward Taylor	Monmouth	X	X	X	X	X
Joseph Saltar	Monmouth	X	-	-	-	-
Robert Montgomery	Monmouth	X	X	-	-	-
John Holmes	Monmouth	X	X	X	X	X
Josiah Holmes	Monmouth	-	-	-	-	X
James Mott	Monmouth	-	-	-	-	X
John Covenhoven	Monmouth	X	X	X	X	X
Daniel Hendrickson	Monmouth	X	X	-	-	-
Nicholas Van Brunt	Monmouth	X	-	-	-	-
William Winds	Morris	X	X	X	N	-
William De Hart	Morris	X	X	X	N	-
William Woodhull	Morris	-	-	-	-	X
Jacob Green	Morris	-	-	-	-	X
Jonathan Stiles	Morris	X	X	-	-	-
David Thompson	Morris	-	X	-	-	-
Peter Dickerson	Morris	X	-	-	-	-
Silas Condict	Morris	X	X	X	X	X
Ellis Cook	Morris	X	X	X	X	X
Jacob Drake	Morris	X	X	X	X	X
Joseph Shinn	Salem	-	-	-	-	X
Whitten Crips	Salem	-	-	-	-	X
Andrew Sinnickson	Salem	X	-	-	-	X
Robert Johnson	Salem	X	-	-	-	-
Samuel Dick	Salem	X	-	-	-	X
Jacob Scoggin	Salem	X	X	-	-	-
James James	Salem	X	X	-	-	-
John Holmes	Salem	-	X	X	X	X
Benjamin Holmes	Salem	-	X	X	X	-
Edward Keasby	Salem	-	-	X	X	-
John Carey	Salem	-	-	X	X	-
Ephraim Lloyd	Salem	-	X	-	-	-
Grant Gibbon	Salem	-	-	N	N	-
Hendrick Fisher	Somerset	X	X	X	X	-
Nathaniel Eyers	Somerset	-	X	-	-	-
John Roy	Somerset	X	-	-	-	-
Peter Schenck	Somerset	X	X	-	-	-
Abraham Van Neste	Somerset	X	X	-	-	-
Enos Kelsey	Somerset	X	X	-	-	-
Jonathan Dickinson Sergeant	Somerset; Middlesex	X	X	-	-	X
Cornelius Van Muliner	Somerset	-	-	X	N	-
Ruloffe Van Dyke	Somerset	-	-	X	X	-
John Witherspoon	Somerset	-	-	-	-	X
Jacob Rutsen Hardenbergh	Somerset	-	-	-	-	X
James Linn	Somerset	-	-	-	-	X
Frederick Frelinghuysen	Somerset	X	X	-	-	X
William Paterson	Somerset	X	X	-	-	X
Archibald Stewart	Sussex	X	-	-	-	-
Edward Dumont	Sussex	X	X	-	-	-
William Maxwell	Sussex	X	X	X	N	-
Ephraim Martin	Sussex	X	-	X	X	X
John Budd Scott	Sussex	-	X	-	-	-
Casper Shafer	Sussex	-	-	-	-	X
John Cleves Symmes	Sussex	-	-	-	-	X
Isaac Van Campen	Sussex	-	-	-	-	X
Mark Thomson	Sussex	-	X	X	X	-
Hugh Hughes	Sussex	-	X	-	-	-
William Norcross	Sussex	-	X	-	-	-
Thomas Potts	Sussex	-	-	X	N	X
Abia (or Abijah) Brown	Sussex	-	-	X	X	-

== See also ==
- Colonial government in the Thirteen Colonies (Council and Assembly)
- Provincial Congress
- New Jersey Legislature
