= Samuel Tucker (politician) =

American politician (1721–1789)

- Born: 1721; New Jersey
- Died: 1789 (aged 67–68); New Jersey
- Occupation: colonial politician

Samuel Tucker (1721–1789) was an American colonial politician who served as a Freeholder in Hunterdon County, New Jersey during the colonial period, and later as President and Treasurer of the Provincial Congress of New Jersey during the American Revolutionary War. During this period, the colony converted to an independent state in 1776 after the ouster of Royal Governor William Franklin and the election of the independent state's first governor, William Livingston.

He was a merchant and landowner in Hunterdon County. He was a justice of the court, high sheriff of Hunterdon County, and assemblyman from 1769 to 1776. He was President of the Provincial Congress of New Jersey from 1775 to 1776.

== See also ==
- List of colonial governors of New Jersey
