= Sarah and Samuel Nicholson House =

Historic house in New Jersey, United States

- U.S. National Register of Historic Places
- New Jersey Register of Historic Places
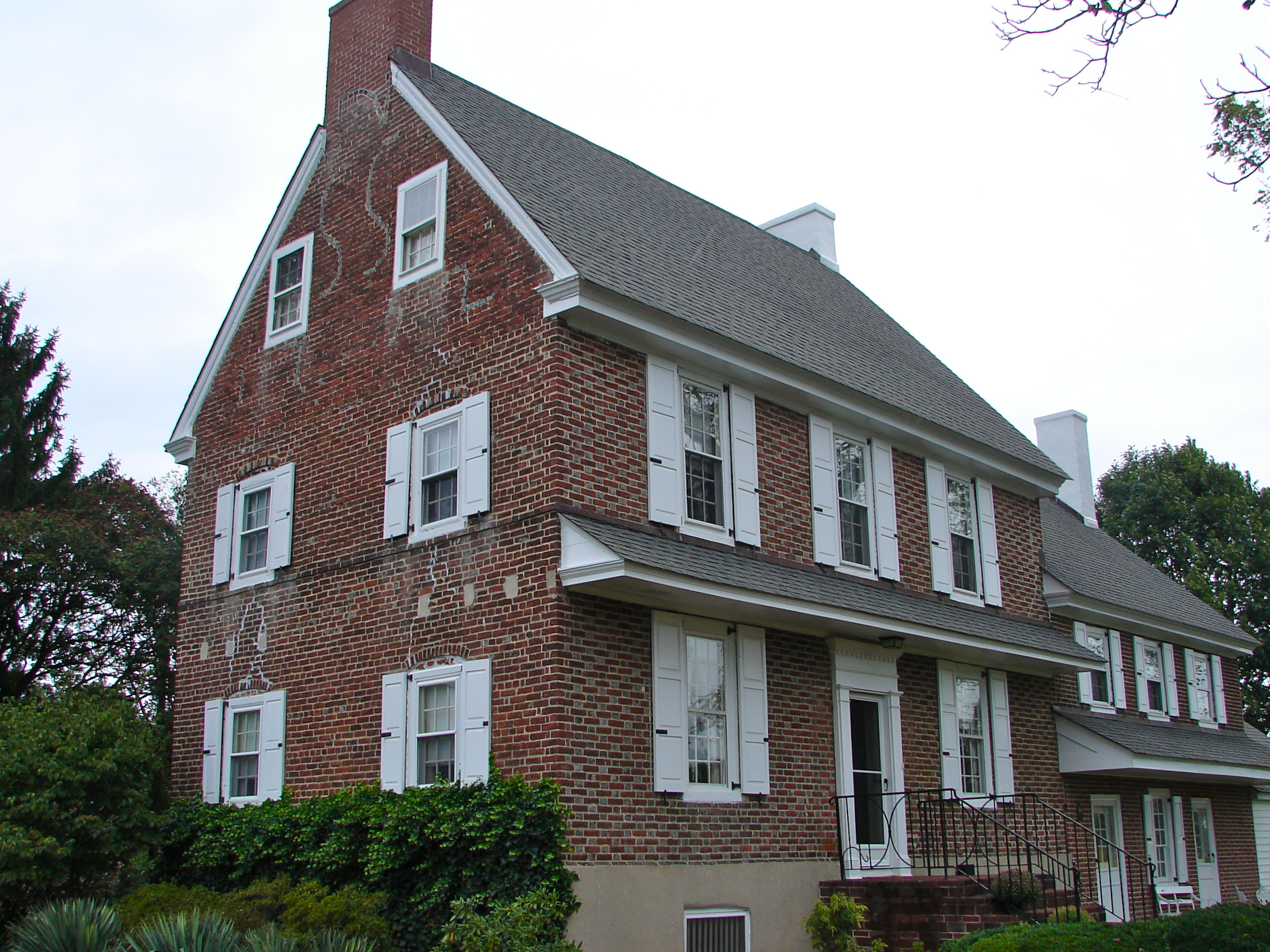

- Location within Salem County, New Jersey Location within New Jersey Location within the United States
- Nearest city: Salem, New Jersey
- Coordinates: 39°32′28″N 75°29′19″W
- Area: 75 acres (30 ha)
- Built: 1752
- Architect: Rocat, Patrick; Moore, Joseph
- NRHP reference No.: 75001158
- NJRHP No.: 2432

Significant dates
- Added to NRHP: February 24, 1975
- Designated NJRHP: November 24, 1974

Sarah and Samuel Nicholson House is located in Salem, Salem County, New Jersey, United States. The house was built in 1752 and was added to the National Register of Historic Places on February 24, 1975.

== See also ==
- National Register of Historic Places listings in Salem County, New Jersey
