= Friesburg, New Jersey =

Populated place in Salem County, New Jersey, US

- Unincorporated community
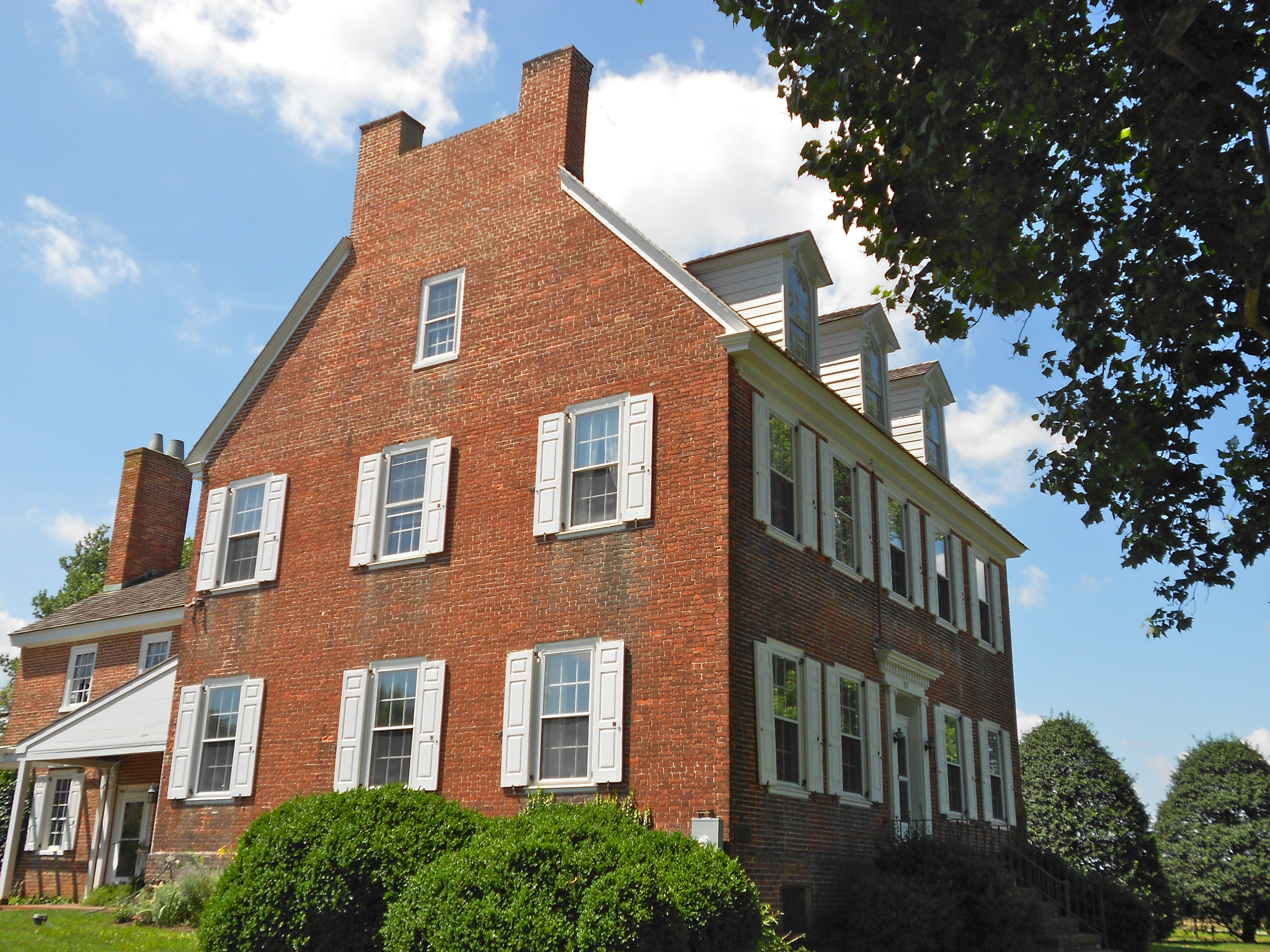
- Philip Fries House, listed on the NRHP

- Location within Salem County, New Jersey Location within New Jersey Location within the United States
- Coordinates: 39°32′41″N 75°17′21″W
- Country: United States
- State: New Jersey
- County: Salem
- Township: Alloway
- Founded: 1748
- Named after: Jacob Fries
- Elevation: 108 ft (33 m)
- GNIS feature ID: 876535

Friesburg is an unincorporated community located within Alloway Township, in Salem County, in the U.S. state of New Jersey. It was founded in 1748 and previously contained a post office, creamery, general store, sawmill, and blacksmith.

Friesburg is named after Jacob Fries who donated the land for the site of the Emanuel Lutheran Church, and who is also buried on the grounds.
