= James Nicholson House (Charleston, South Carolina) =

Historic house in South Carolina, United States

- U.S. National Register of Historic Places
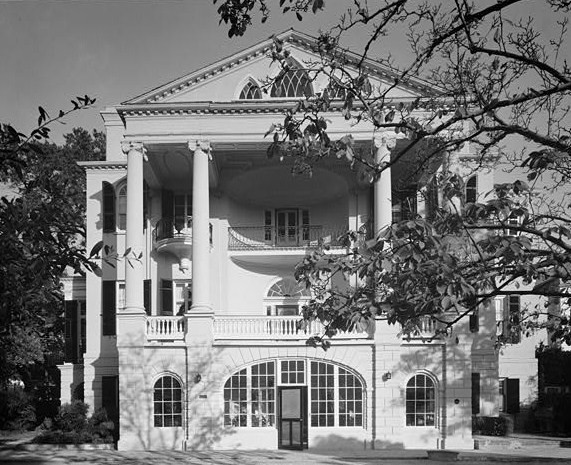

- Location within South Carolina Location within the United States
- Location: 172 Rutledge Ave., Charleston, South Carolina
- Coordinates: 32°47′12″N 79°56′44″W
- Built: c. 1816
- Architect: possibly William Jay
- Architectural style: Regency
- NRHP reference No.: 74001832
- Added to NRHP: Aug. 30, 1974

The James Nicholson House is a notable early 19th-century residence in Charleston, South Carolina which has housed the Ashley Hall school since 1909. The house was built ca. 1816 for Patrick Duncan. The architect for the house is not known, but authorities cite William Jay as its possible designer; he worked in Charleston and Savannah between 1817 and 1822. James Nicholson owned the property from 1829 to 1838 when James R. Pringle bought it; after Pringle's death, his family sold it in 1845 to Secretary of the Confederate Treasury General George Trenholm. From 1877 to 1909, it was the home of Charles Otto Witte's family, the foremost banker in South Carolina. Many characters in Margaret Mitchell's Gone with the Wind novel, including Rhett Butler, were based upon residents of this historic homestead, and the O'Hara plantation itself was modeled on its grounds.

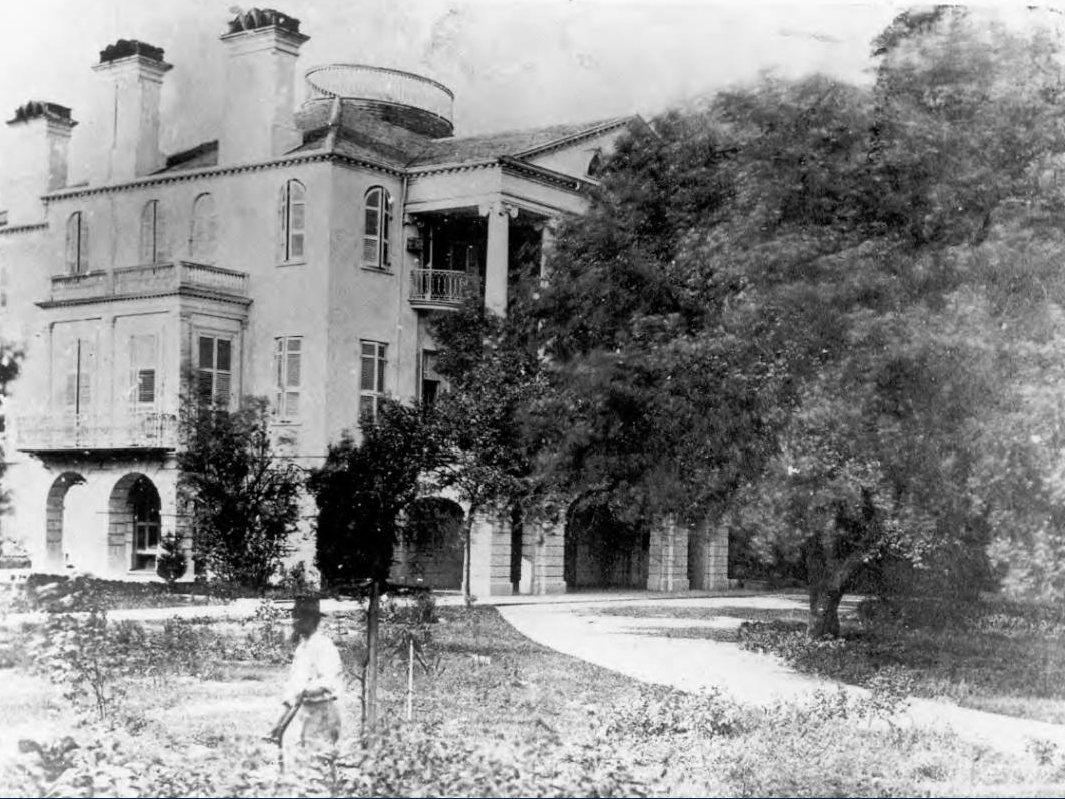
This photograph from about 1876 shows a rooftop deck that no longer exists.

The Classical Revival building is stuccoed brick. The main two floors are above a high, rusticated basement. The portico is supported by four giant-order Ionic columns with Renaissance capitals. The pediment has a three-part Gothic window. Originally open (as seen in the 1876 photograph to the left), the arches of the basement have been enclosed with windows.

The house was listed in the National Register August 30, 1974.
