= Woodstown, New Jersey =

Borough in Salem County, New Jersey, US

- Borough
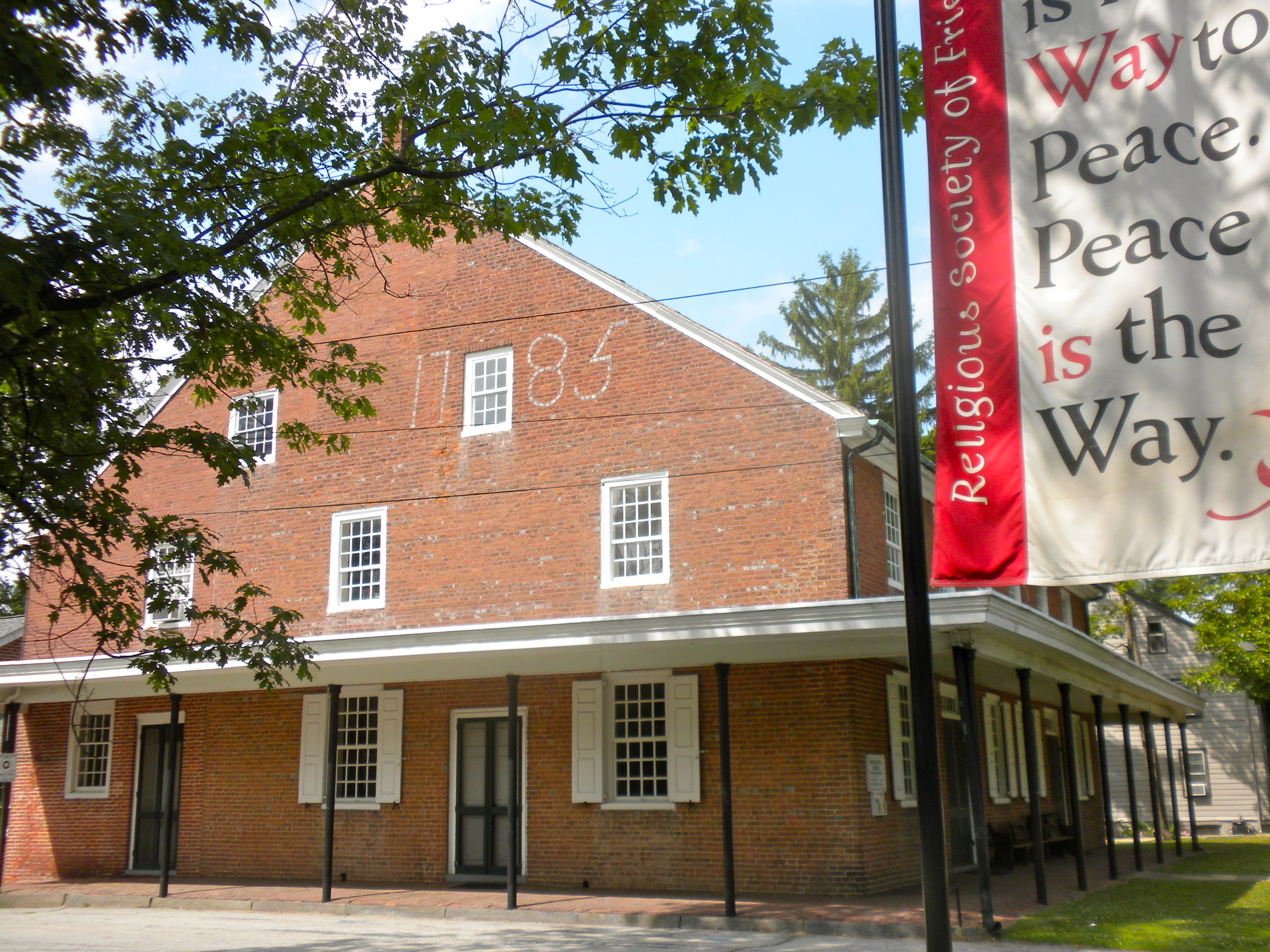
- Woodstown Friends Meetinghouse

- Woodstown highlighted in Salem County. Inset map: Salem County highlighted in the State of New Jersey.

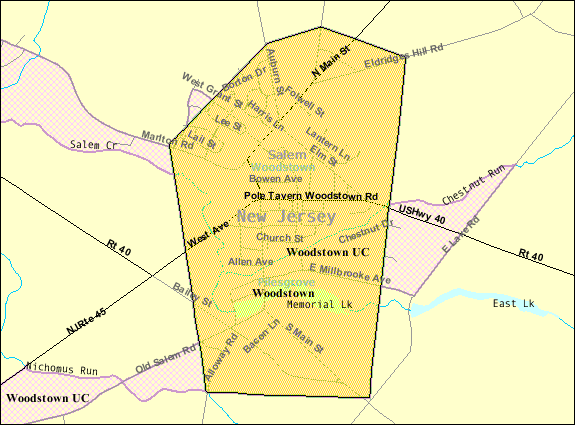
- Census Bureau map of Woodstown, New Jersey

- Location in Salem County Location in New Jersey Location in the United States
- Coordinates: 39.650178°N 75.326232°W
- Country: United States
- State: New Jersey
- County: Salem
- Incorporated: July 26, 1882

Government
  - Type: Borough
  - Body: Borough Council
  - Mayor: Joseph H. Hiles (D, term ends December 31, 2027)
  - Municipal clerk: Cynthia Dalessio

Area
  - Total: 1.61 sq mi (4.18 km^{2})
  - Land: 1.58 sq mi (4.08 km^{2})
  - Water: 0.039 sq mi (0.10 km^{2}) 2.47%
  - Rank: 437th of 565 in state 13th of 15 in county
- Elevation: 49 ft (15 m)

Population (2020)
  - Total: 3,678
  - Estimate (2023): 3,728
  - Rank: 423rd of 565 in state 7th of 15 in county
  - Density: 2,335.4/sq mi (901.7/km^{2})
  - Rank: 265th of 565 in state 2nd of 15 in county
- Time zone: UTC−05:00 (Eastern (EST))
  - Summer (DST): UTC−04:00 (Eastern (EDT))
- ZIP Code: 08098
- Area code: 856 exchange: 769
- FIPS code: 3403382720
- GNIS feature ID: 0885452
- Website: www.historicwoodstown.org

Woodstown is a borough in Salem County, in the U.S. state of New Jersey. As of the 2020 United States census, the borough's population was 3,678, an increase of 173 (+4.9%) from the 2010 census count of 3,505, which in turn reflected an increase of 369 (+11.8%) from the 3,136 counted in the 2000 census.

Woodstown was established on July 26, 1882, from portions of Pilesgrove Township based on the results of a referendum held that same day. The borough's incorporation was confirmed on March 3, 1925. The borough was named for early settler Jackanias (or Jaconias) Wood.

== Geography ==
According to the United States Census Bureau, the borough had a total area of 1.62 square miles (4.18 km^{2}), including 1.58 square miles (4.08 km^{2}) of land and 0.04 square miles (0.10 km^{2}) of water (2.47%).

The Borough of Woodstown is an independent municipality completely surrounded by Pilesgrove Township, making it part of 21 pairs of "doughnut towns" in the state, where one municipality entirely surrounds another. Woodstown serves as the more densely settled commercial core of the paired communities, while Pilesgrove is more agricultural.

== Demographics ==
Historical population
Census	Pop.	Note	%±
1880	490		—
1890	1,516		209.4%
1900	1,371		−9.6%
1910	1,613		17.7%
1920	1,589		−1.5%
1930	1,832		15.3%
1940	2,027		10.6%
1950	2,345		15.7%
1960	2,942		25.5%
1970	3,137		6.6%
1980	3,250		3.6%
1990	3,154		−3.0%
2000	3,136		−0.6%
2010	3,505		11.8%
2020	3,678		4.9%
2023 (est.)	3,728	▲	1.4%
Population sources: 1880–1890; 1890–2000 1890–1920; 1890–1910 1910–1930; 1900–1990 2000; 2010 2020

=== 2020 census ===
As of the 2020 census, Woodstown had a population of 3,678. The median age was 40.2 years. 23.4% of residents were under the age of 18 and 17.1% of residents were 65 years of age or older. For every 100 females there were 90.1 males, and for every 100 females age 18 and over there were 89.2 males age 18 and over.

0.0% of residents lived in urban areas, while 100.0% lived in rural areas.

There were 1,533 households in Woodstown, of which 32.4% had children under the age of 18 living in them. Of all households, 43.2% were married-couple households, 17.1% were households with a male householder and no spouse or partner present, and 30.1% were households with a female householder and no spouse or partner present. About 29.8% of all households were made up of individuals and 13.8% had someone living alone who was 65 years of age or older.

There were 1,603 housing units, of which 4.4% were vacant. The homeowner vacancy rate was 1.7% and the rental vacancy rate was 2.9%.

Racial composition as of the 2020 census
Race	Number	Percent
White	2,889	78.5%
Black or African American	408	11.1%
American Indian and Alaska Native	18	0.5%
Asian	57	1.5%
Native Hawaiian and Other Pacific Islander	0	0.0%
Some other race	67	1.8%
Two or more races	239	6.5%
Hispanic or Latino (of any race)	247	6.7%

=== 2010 census ===
The 2010 United States census counted 3,505 people, 1,444 households, and 939 families in the borough. The population density was 2,211.8 inhabitants per square mile (854.0/km^{2}). There were 1,529 housing units at an average density of 964.9 per square mile (372.5/km^{2}). The racial makeup was 82.25% (2,883) White, 11.44% (401) Black or African American, 0.51% (18) Native American, 1.17% (41) Asian, 0.03% (1) Pacific Islander, 1.28% (45) from other races, and 3.31% (116) from two or more races. Hispanic or Latino of any race were 5.56% (195) of the population.

Of the 1,444 households, 31.6% had children under the age of 18; 45.7% were married couples living together; 15.0% had a female householder with no husband present and 35.0% were non-families. Of all households, 29.2% were made up of individuals and 12.3% had someone living alone who was 65 years of age or older. The average household size was 2.41 and the average family size was 2.99.

25.2% of the population were under the age of 18, 7.2% from 18 to 24, 25.4% from 25 to 44, 27.8% from 45 to 64, and 14.5% who were 65 years of age or older. The median age was 39.0 years. For every 100 females, the population had 90.2 males. For every 100 females ages 18 and older there were 85.5 males.

The Census Bureau's 2006–2010 American Community Survey showed that (in 2010 inflation-adjusted dollars) median household income was $62,958 (with a margin of error of +/− $8,239) and the median family income was $74,479 (+/− $7,727). Males had a median income of $64,688 (+/− $16,960) versus $40,781 (+/− $8,241) for females. The per capita income for the borough was $31,074 (+/− $3,576). About 3.4% of families and 8.7% of the population were below the poverty line, including 6.0% of those under age 18 and 8.5% of those age 65 or over.

=== 2000 census ===
As of the 2000 United States census there were 3,136 people, 1,304 households, and 839 families residing in the borough. The population density was 1,975.6 inhabitants per square mile (762.8/km^{2}). There were 1,389 housing units at an average density of 875.0 per square mile (337.8/km^{2}). The racial makeup of the borough was 85.04% White, 12.91% African American, 0.19% Native American, 0.73% Asian, 0.26% from other races, and 0.86% from two or more races. Hispanic or Latino of any race were 1.56% of the population.

There were 1,304 households, out of which 30.1% had children under the age of 18 living with them, 49.5% were married couples living together, 11.5% had a female householder with no husband present, and 35.6% were non-families. 30.8% of all households were made up of individuals, and 14.5% had someone living alone who was 65 years of age or older. The average household size was 2.38 and the average family size was 3.00.

In the borough the population was spread out, with 24.7% under the age of 18, 6.9% from 18 to 24, 29.6% from 25 to 44, 22.3% from 45 to 64, and 16.5% who were 65 years of age or older. The median age was 38 years. For every 100 females, there were 87.0 males. For every 100 females age 18 and over, there were 83.8 males.

The median income for a household in the borough was $44,533, and the median income for a family was $56,328. Males had a median income of $42,175 versus $31,169 for females. The per capita income for the borough was $24,182. About 3.5% of families and 5.5% of the population were below the poverty line, including 9.0% of those under age 18 and 4.3% of those age 65 or over.

== Government ==
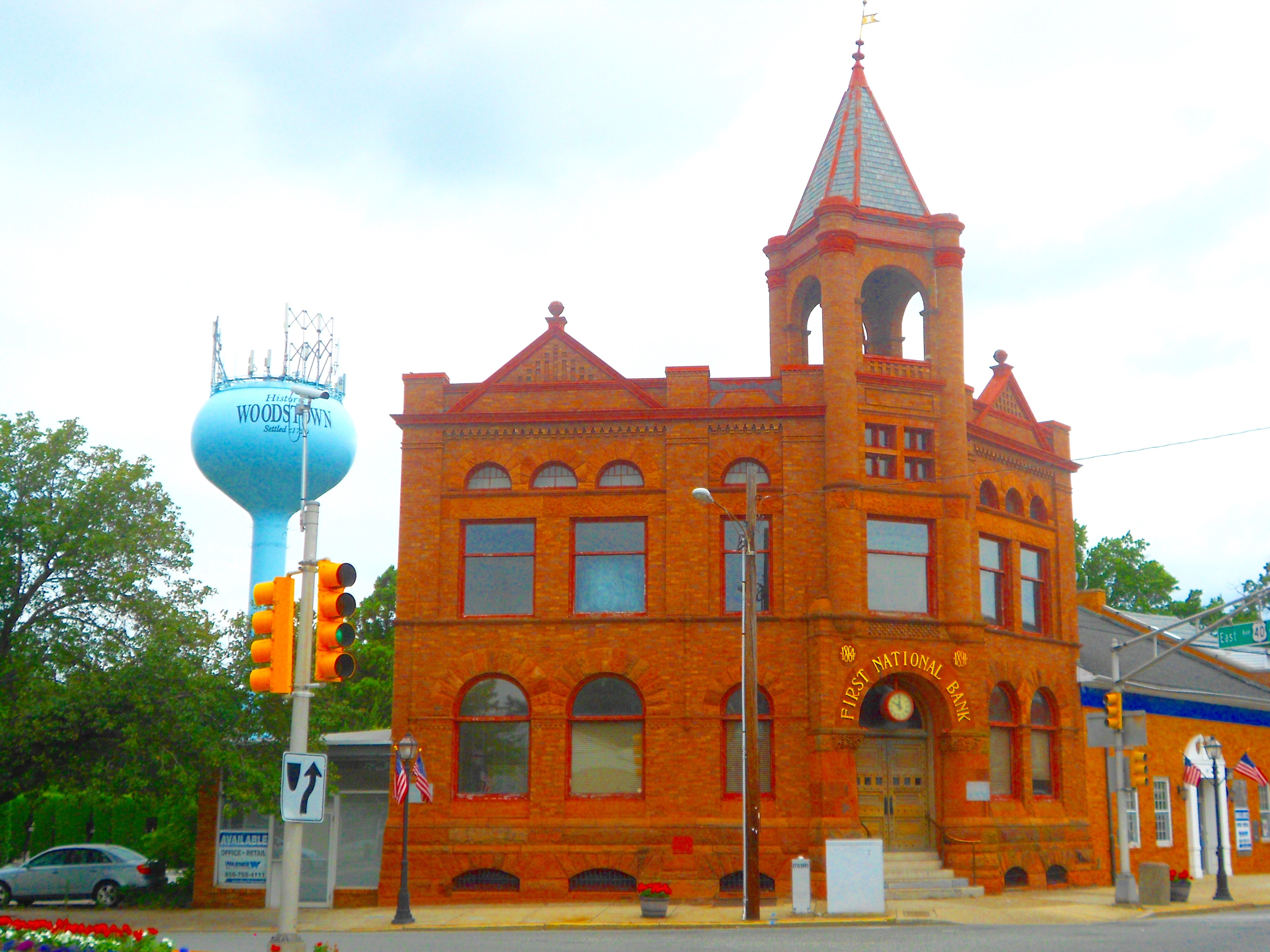
First National Bank

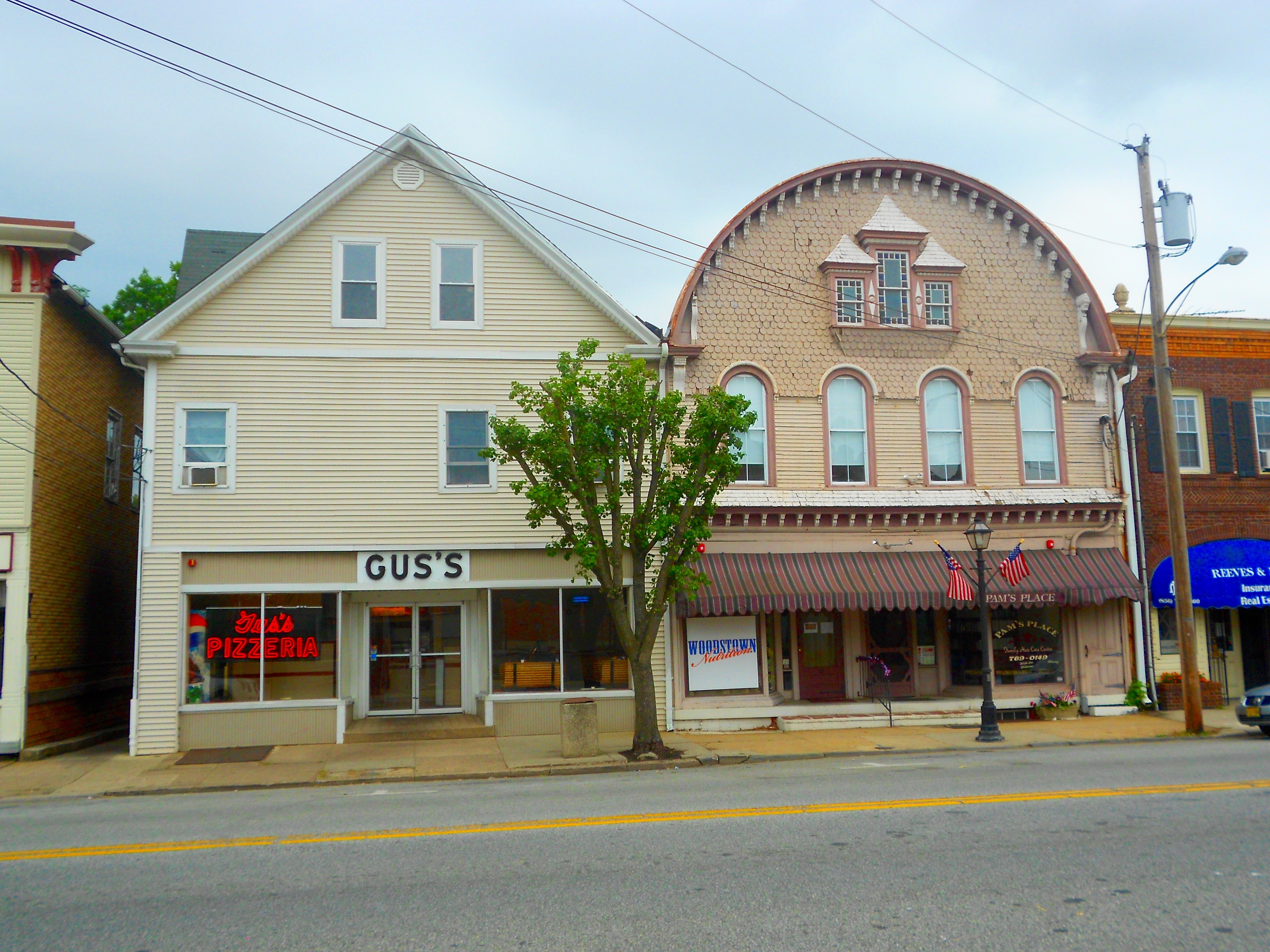
Businesses on South Main Street

=== Local government ===
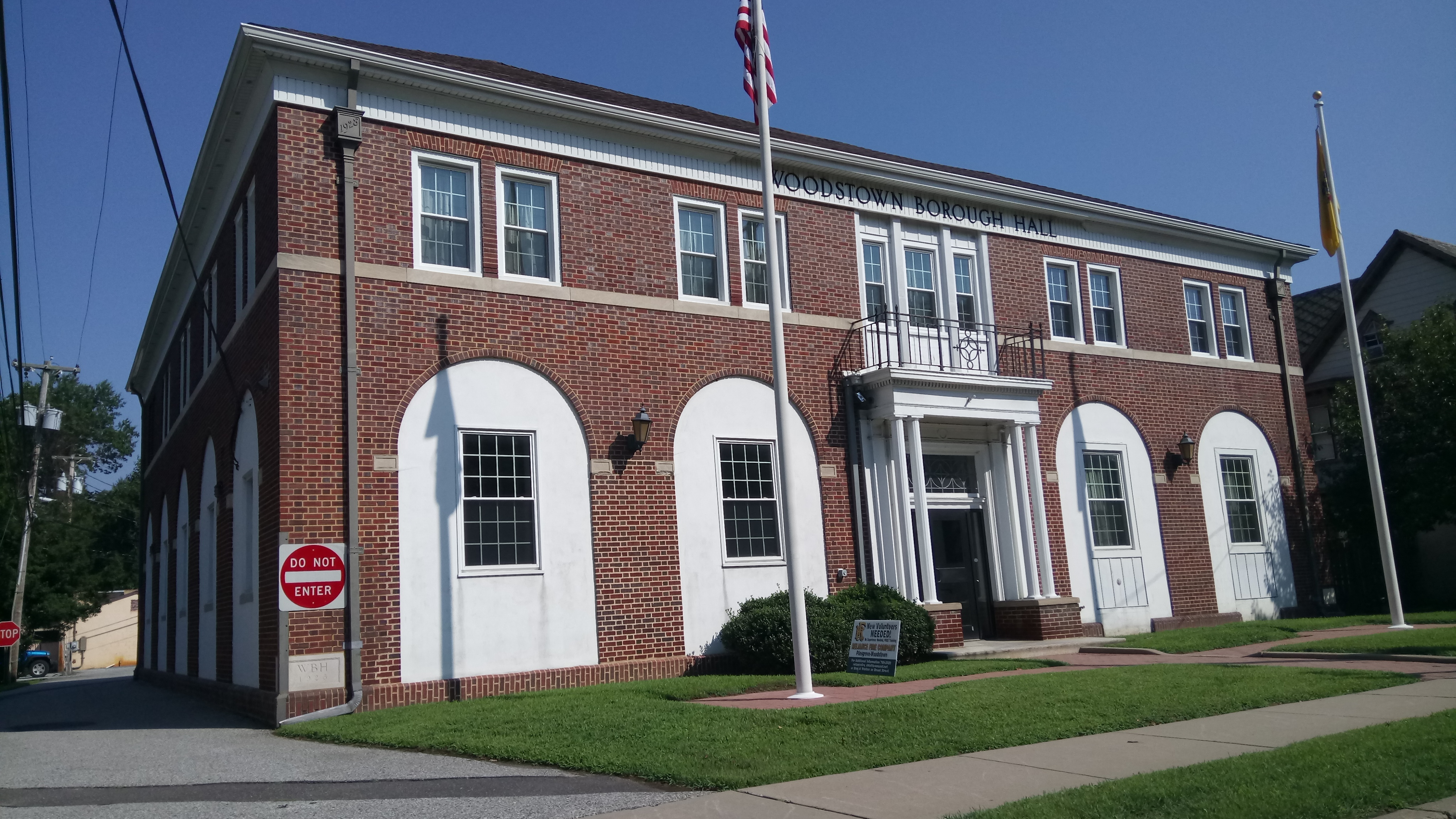
Borough hall

Woodstown is governed under the borough form of New Jersey municipal government, which is used in 218 municipalities (of the 564) statewide, making it the most common form of government in New Jersey. The governing body is comprised of the mayor and the borough council, with all positions elected at-large on a partisan basis as part of the November general election. The mayor is elected directly by the voters to a four-year term of office. The borough council includes six members elected to serve three-year terms on a staggered basis, with two seats coming up for election each year in a three-year cycle. The borough form of government used by Woodstown is a "weak mayor / strong council" government in which council members act as the legislative body with the mayor presiding at meetings and voting only in the event of a tie. The mayor can veto ordinances subject to an override by a two-thirds majority vote of the council. The mayor makes committee and liaison assignments for council members, and most appointments are made by the mayor with the advice and consent of the council.

As of 2025, the Mayor of the Borough of Woodstown is (D Joseph H. Hiles, whose term of office ends December 31, 2027. Members of the Woodstown Borough Council are Council President Glenn Merkle (R, 2027), Heather Bobbitt (R, 2026), Jim Hackett (R, 2026), Bertha Hyman (R, 2025), Jesse Stemberger (D, 2027) and Noah Tighe (R, 2025; elected to serve an unexpired term).

In March 2015, the borough council selected Debbie Tierno from among three candidates nominated by the Republican municipal committee to fill the vacant seat of Fran Grenier who had resigned the previous month.

Matt Perry was selected by the borough council in December 2013 from among three candidates offered by the Republican municipal committee to fill the vacant seat of Veronica Soultz who resigned from office the previous month after moving out of the borough.

=== Federal, state and county representation ===
Woodstown is located in the 2nd Congressional District and is part of New Jersey's 3rd state legislative district.

For the 119th United States Congress, New Jersey's 2nd congressional district is represented by Jeff Van Drew (R, Dennis Township). New Jersey is represented in the United States Senate by Democrats Cory Booker (Newark, term ends 2027) and Andy Kim (Moorestown, term ends 2031).

For the 2026–2027 session, the 3rd legislative district of the New Jersey Legislature is represented in the State Senate by John Burzichelli (D, Paulsboro) and in the General Assembly by David Bailey (D, Woodstown) and Heather Simmons (D, Glassboro).

Salem County is governed by a five-member Board of County Commissioners who are elected at-large to serve three-year terms of office on a staggered basis, with either one or two seats coming up for election each year. At an annual reorganization meeting held in the beginning of January, the board selects a Director and a Deputy Director from among its members. As of 2025, Salem County's Commissioners (with party, residence, and term-end year listed in parentheses) are:

Director Benjamin H. Laury (R, Elmer, 2027), Deputy Director Cordy Taylor (R, Oldmans Township, 2028), Paul Collier (R, Lower Alloways Creek, 2027), Ed Ramsey (R, Pittsgrove Township, 2026), and Daniel Timmerman (R, Elmer, 2028).

Constitutional officers elected on a countywide basis are: Clerk Dale A. Cross (R, Pennsville Township, 2029), Sheriff Charles M. Miller (R, Salem, 2027) and Surrogate Gordon J. Ostrum Jr. (R, Pilesgrove Township, 2030).

=== Politics ===
As of March 2011, there were a total of 2,340 registered voters in Woodstown, of which 664 (28.4% vs. 30.6% countywide) were registered as Democrats, 573 (24.5% vs. 21.0%) were registered as Republicans and 1,099 (47.0% vs. 48.4%) were registered as Unaffiliated. There were 4 voters registered as Libertarians or Greens. Among the borough's 2010 Census population, 66.8% (vs. 64.6% in Salem County) were registered to vote, including 89.2% of those ages 18 and over (vs. 84.4% countywide).

Gubernatorial election results for Woodstown
Year	Republican		Democratic		Third party(ies)	
Year	No.	%	No.	%	No.	%
2025	694	45.63%	815	53.58%	12	0.79%
2021	679	54.54%	556	44.66%	10	0.80%
2017	446	40.33%	616	55.70%	44	3.98%
2013	704	62.91%	387	34.58%	28	2.50%
2009	522	45.87%	489	42.97%	127	11.16%
2005	521	45.94%	568	50.09%	45	3.97%

In the 2012 presidential election, Democrat Barack Obama received 51.7% of the vote (886 cast), ahead of Republican Mitt Romney with 46.2% (792 votes), and other candidates with 2.1% (36 votes), among the 1,728 ballots cast by the borough's 2,497 registered voters (14 ballots were spoiled), for a turnout of 69.2%. In the 2008 presidential election, Democrat Barack Obama received 936 votes (52.3% vs. 50.4% countywide), ahead of Republican John McCain with 821 votes (45.8% vs. 46.6%) and other candidates with 19 votes (1.1% vs. 1.6%), among the 1,791 ballots cast by the borough's 2,340 registered voters, for a turnout of 76.5% (vs. 71.8% in Salem County). In the 2004 presidential election, Republican George W. Bush received 818 votes (50.8% vs. 52.5% countywide), ahead of Democrat John Kerry with 766 votes (47.5% vs. 45.9%) and other candidates with 11 votes (0.7% vs. 1.0%), among the 1,611 ballots cast by the borough's 2,241 registered voters, for a turnout of 71.9% (vs. 71.0% in the whole county).

United States presidential election results for Woodstown 2024 2020 2016 2012 2008 2004
Year	Republican		Democratic		Third party(ies)	
Year	No.	%	No.	%	No.	%
2024	924	46.83%	1,012	51.29%	37	1.88%
2020	918	43.94%	1,121	53.66%	50	2.39%
2016	787	44.89%	864	49.29%	102	5.82%
2012	792	46.21%	886	51.69%	36	2.10%
2008	821	46.23%	936	52.70%	19	1.07%
2004	818	50.97%	776	48.35%	11	0.69%

In the 2013 gubernatorial election, Republican Chris Christie received 62.9% of the vote (704 cast), ahead of Democrat Barbara Buono with 34.6% (387 votes), and other candidates with 2.5% (28 votes), among the 1,132 ballots cast by the borough's 2,472 registered voters (13 ballots were spoiled), for a turnout of 45.8%. In the 2009 gubernatorial election, Republican Chris Christie received 522 votes (45.4% vs. 46.1% countywide), ahead of Democrat Jon Corzine with 489 votes (42.5% vs. 39.9%), Independent Chris Daggett with 108 votes (9.4% vs. 9.7%) and other candidates with 19 votes (1.7% vs. 2.0%), among the 1,150 ballots cast by the borough's 2,361 registered voters, yielding a 48.7% turnout (vs. 47.3% in the county).

United States Senate election results for Woodstown1
Year	Republican		Democratic		Third party(ies)	
Year	No.	%	No.	%	No.	%
2024	912	46.39%	1,006	51.17%	48	2.44%
2018	743	48.85%	703	46.22%	75	4.93%
2012	750	44.78%	866	51.70%	59	3.52%
2006	576	48.81%	573	48.56%	31	2.63%

United States Senate election results for Woodstown2
Year	Republican		Democratic		Third party(ies)	
Year	No.	%	No.	%	No.	%
2020	914	43.86%	1,116	53.55%	54	2.59%
2014	525	48.12%	523	47.94%	43	3.94%
2013	332	53.29%	282	45.26%	9	1.44%
2008	796	46.28%	865	50.29%	59	3.43%

== Education ==
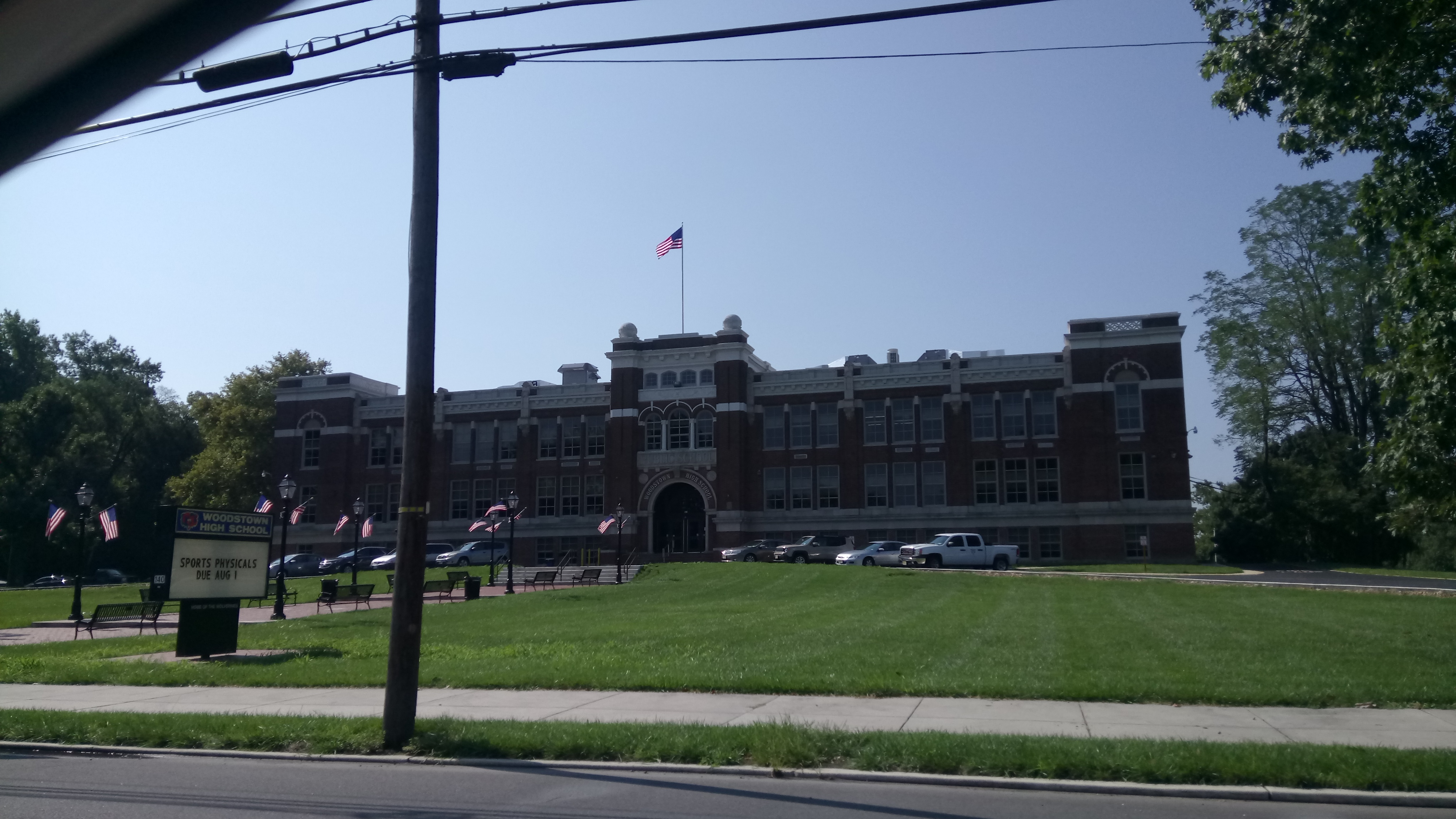
Woodstown High School

The Woodstown-Pilesgrove Regional School District serves public school students in pre-kindergarten through twelfth grade from Woodstown and Pilesgrove Township. As of the 2020–21 school year, the district, comprised of four schools, had an enrollment of 1,425 students and 126.5 classroom teachers (on an FTE basis), for a student–teacher ratio of 11.3:1. Schools in the district (with 2020–21 enrollment data from the National Center for Education Statistics) are William Roper Early Childhood Learning Center with 83 students in grades PreK-K, Mary S. Shoemaker Elementary School with 470 students in grades 1-5, Woodstown Middle School with 278 students in grades 6-8 and Woodstown High School with 579 students in grades 9-12. Students from neighboring Alloway Township, Oldmans Township and Upper Pittsgrove Township attend the high school as part of sending/receiving relationships. A majority of public school students in grades 9–12 from Oldmans Township attend Penns Grove High School as part of a sending/receiving relationship with the Penns Grove-Carneys Point Regional School District, with the balance attending Woodstown High School.

== Transportation ==
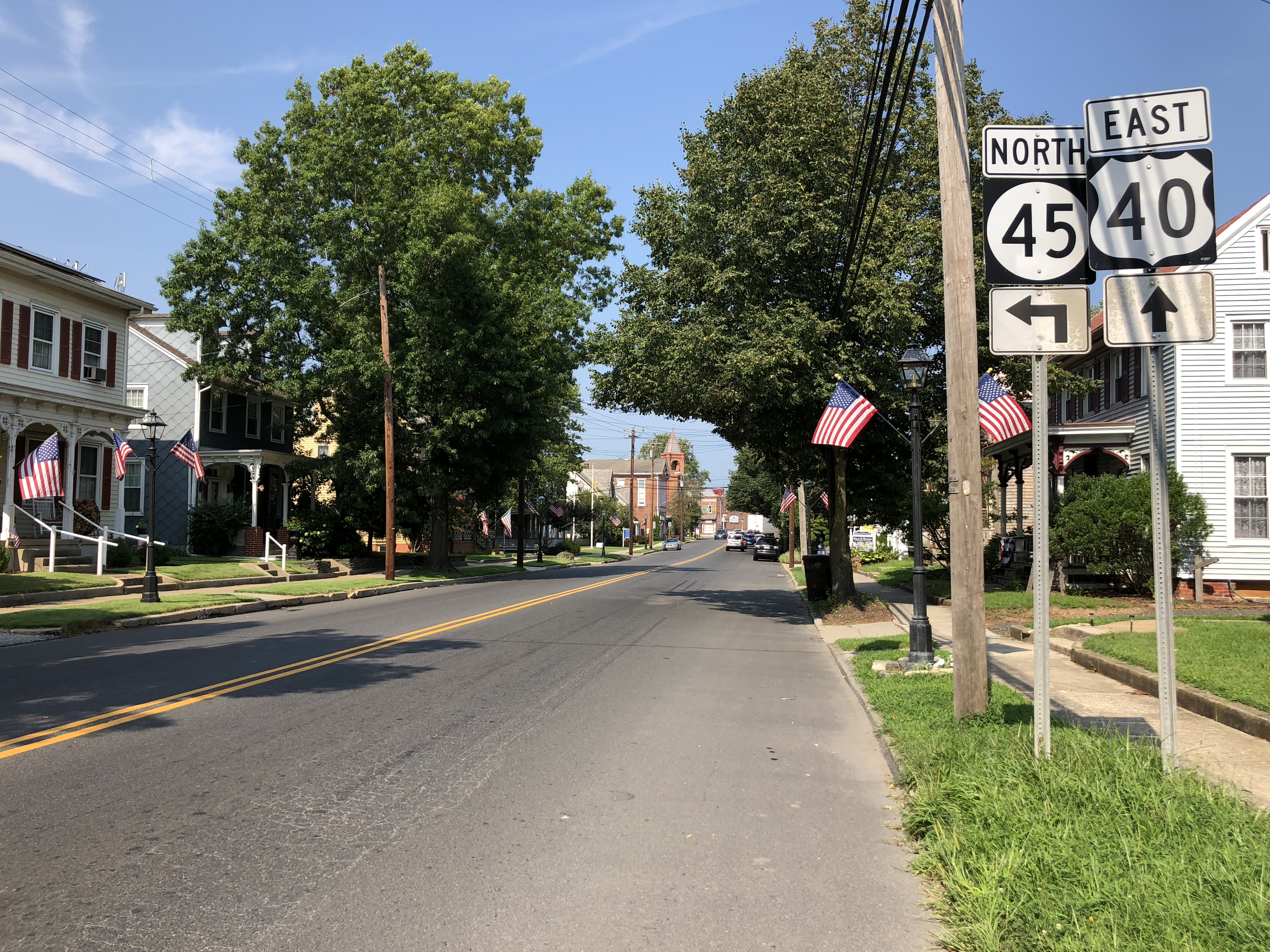
U.S. Route 40 and Route 45 serve Woodstown

=== Roads and highways ===
As of May 2010, the borough had a total of 18.28 miles (29.42 km) of roadways, of which 11.51 miles (18.52 km) were maintained by the municipality, 4.66 miles (7.50 km) by Salem County, and 2.11 miles (3.40 km) by the New Jersey Department of Transportation.

U.S. Route 40 traverses the borough roughly east to west and Route 45 roughly south to north.

=== Public transportation ===
NJ Transit provides bus service between Salem and Philadelphia on the 401 route, with local service offered on the 468 route operating between Penns Grove and Woodstown.

The 18.6 miles (29.9 km) southern portion of the freight rail Salem Branch operated under contract by Southern Railroad of New Jersey runs through the borough.

== Notable people ==
People who were born in, residents of, or otherwise closely associated with Woodstown include:

- Teyona Anderson (born 1989), winner of America's Next Top Model (season 12)
- David Bailey (born 1967), politician who has represented the 3rd legislative district in the New Jersey General Assembly since January 2024
- Isaac A. Barber (1852–1909), U.S. Congressman from Maryland, serving from 1897 to 1899
- Emma Bell (born 1986), actress
- Mario Cerrito (born 1984), horror filmmaker
- Isaiah D. Clawson (1820–1879), represented New Jersey's 1st congressional district in the United States House of Representatives from 1855 to 1859
- Fred Drains (born 1971), American-born and naturalized Swedish basketball player
- Rachel Davis DuBois (1892–1993), educator, human rights activist and pioneer of intercultural education
- Hilly Flitcraft (1923–2003), pitcher whose MLB career consisted of three games played with the Philadelphia Phillies during the 1942 season at the age of 19
- Emile Fritz (1920–2015), football player
- Elwood L. Haines (1893–1949), Bishop of the Episcopal Diocese of Iowa from 1944 to 1949
- Tara LaRosa (born 1978), mixed martial arts fighter
- Everett Shinn (1876–1953), realist painter best known for his work with the Ashcan School
- H. Donald Stewart (born 1939), politician who served in the New Jersey General Assembly from 1972 to 1982
