= Alloway (disambiguation) =

Alloway is an extended village and suburb of Ayr on the River Doon in Scotland.

Alloway may also refer to:

== Places ==
- Alloway (cottage), located in Moree, New South Wales, Australia
- Alloway Creek, US
- Alloway railway station, a disused railway station in South Ayrshire, Scotland
- Alloway Township, New Jersey, US
  - Alloway (CDP), New Jersey, a census-designated place in the township
- Alloway, New York, a hamlet in the town of Lyons
- Alloway, Tennessee, an unincorporated community in the US

== People ==
- Lawrence Alloway (1926–1990), English art critic
- Tracy Packiam Alloway, British psychologist

== Ships ==
- USS Alloway, the name of more than one US Navy ship

== See also ==
- Alloa
