= Ozone (disambiguation) =

Ozone is a molecule consisting of three oxygen atoms.

Ozone may also refer to:

== Fictional characters ==
- Ozone (G.I. Joe), a fictional character in the G.I. Joe universe
- Ozone, a character played by Shabba Doo in the movies Breakin' and Breakin' 2: Electric Boogaloo

== Media ==
- Ozone (magazine), a magazine
- Ozone (film), a horror movie produced by Full Moon Features

== People ==
- Alex Ozone, Nigerian talent manager and show promoter
- Makoto Ozone (born 1961), a Japanese jazz pianist
- Ozone, one of many stage names of Jezper Söderlund, Swedish DJ

== Places ==
=== United States ===
- Ozone, Arkansas, an unincorporated community in the U.S.
- Ozone Falls (disambiguation)
- Ozone, Idaho
- Ozone, Tennessee, an unincorporated community in the U.S.
- Ozone Park, Queens, a New York City neighborhood
- South Ozone Park, Queens, a New York City neighborhood

=== Elsewhere ===
- Ōzone (大曽根), Japan, a district in Kita-ku, Nagoya, central Japan
  - Ōzone Station, the station serving the district
- Ozone Disco, Diliman, Quezon City, Philippines, the place of the Ozone Disco fire one of the worst nightclub fires in the world

== Other uses ==
- Ozone, a 3D plugin component of E-on Vue scenery generator software
- Ozone, a series of audio mastering plugins made by iZotope (Ozone 7, 8, 9, 10)
- Ozone F.C., an Indian association football team
- Ozone (American band), an early 1980s funk/soul group signed to Motown records
- Ozone Gliders, a French paraglider manufacturer
- Ozone House, a non-profit youth shelter in Ann Arbor, Michigan, US
- Ozone (paddle steamer), an early Australian paddle steamer
- Ozone Theatres, a former cinema chain in South Australia
- Ozone Wireless, Barbadian mobile network operator and telecommunications company

== See also ==
- O-Zone (disambiguation)
- Ozon (disambiguation)
