= Renegade Mountain, Tennessee =

Unincorporated community in Tennessee, US

Coordinates: 35.884793°N 84.858281°W

Renegade Mountain (also known simply as Renegade) is an unincorporated community and a resort community in Cumberland County, Tennessee, located on the Cumberland Plateau. Renegade Mountain bills itself as "Quite possibly the best place to live in Tennessee". Renegade Mountain has a full-time population of around 40 people according to its website.

== Amenities ==
There is no mail delivery service but residents are given a free postal box in Crab Orchard, there is no school bus stop or trash pick-up in the Resort however they are both nearby at the bottom of the mountain. There was a golf course and a sports park which included a pool, tennis courts and a small playground and picnic area, all of which have fallen into disrepair.

== Utilities ==
Electric, high speed internet, telephone, cell phone, cable and satellite services are available. Water is provided Crab Orchard Utility District.

== Renegade Mountain Resort murders ==
On September 12, 2013, four people were found shot to death in a car. Three were teenagers and one was 22 years old.
