= Mayland =

Mayland may refer to:

- Mayland Heights, Calgary, Canada
- Mayland, Essex, England
- Mayland, Tennessee, United States

== See also ==
- Maylandia, a genus of fish
- Maylands (disambiguation)
