= Ozone Falls (disambiguation) =

Ozone Falls is the name of two waterfalls in the United States:

- Ozone Falls and Ozone Falls State Natural Area in Tennessee
- One of 24 named waterfalls in Ricketts Glen State Park in Pennsylvania
