= SS Cansumset =

History

United States
- Name: Cansumset
- Owner: USSB
- Operator: Williams, Dimond & Co.
- Ordered: 16 November 1917
- Builder: Pacific Coast Shipbuilding Company, Bay Point
- Yard number: 2
- Laid down: 25 May 1918
- Launched: 30 March 1919
- Sponsored by: Miss Beatrice Hannay
- Commissioned: 19 August 1919
- Maiden voyage: 28 August 1919
- Home port: San Francisco
- Identification: US Official Number 218689; Call sign LSGV
- Fate: Scrapped, 1930

General characteristics
- Type: Design 1015 ship
- Tonnage: 5,996 GRT; 4,465 NRT; 9,646 DWT
- Length: 402.5 ft (122.7 m)
- Beam: 53.0 ft (16.2 m)
- Draft: 26 ft 6 in (8.08 m) (loaded)
- Depth: 32.0 ft (9.8 m)
- Installed power: 2,800 shp
- Propulsion: Kerr Turbine Co. steam turbine, double reduction geared to one screw
- Speed: 11 knots (13 mph; 20 km/h)

Cansumset was a steam cargo ship built in 1918–1919 by Pacific Coast Shipbuilding Company of Bay Point for the United States Shipping Board as part of the wartime shipbuilding program of the Emergency Fleet Corporation (EFC) to restore the nation's Merchant Marine. The vessel was largely employed on the Pacific Coast of the United States to Europe route until 1921 when it was laid up and eventually broken up for scrap in 1930. Due to frequent breakdowns during her short career the freighter was known as the "Hoodoo" ship of the USSB.

== Design and construction ==
After the United States entry into World War I, a large shipbuilding program was undertaken to restore and enhance shipping capabilities both of the United States and their Allies. As part of this program, EFC placed orders with nation's shipyards for a large number of vessels of standard designs. Design 1015 cargo ship was a standard cargo freighter of approximately 9,400 tons deadweight designed by Moore Shipbuilding Co. and adopted by USSB.

Cansumset was part of the order for 10 vessels placed by USSB with Pacific Coast Shipbuilding Co. on 16 November 1917 and was laid down on 25 May 1918 at the shipbuilder's yard and launched on 30 March 1919 (yard number 2), with Miss Beatrice Hannay, daughter of E.W. Hannay, superintendent of hull construction, being the sponsor. Just as with many other vessels being built for the Shipping Board, her name was picked by Mrs. Woodrow Wilson who often chose Native American words for naming purposes.

The ship was shelter-deck type, had two main decks and was built on the Isherwood principle of longitudinal framing providing extra strength to the body of the vessel. The freighter had four main holds and also possessed all the modern machinery for quick loading and unloading of cargo from five large hatches, including ten winches and a large number of derricks. She was also equipped with wireless apparatus, had submarine signal system installed and had electrical lights installed along the decks.

As built, the ship was 402.5 feet (122.7 m) long (between perpendiculars) and 53.0 feet (16.2 m) abeam, a depth of 32.0 feet (9.8 m). Cansumset was originally assessed at 5,996 GRT and 4,465 NRT and had deadweight of approximately 9,646. The vessel had a steel hull with double bottom throughout with exception of her machine compartment, and a single turbine rated at 2,800 shp, double-reduction geared to a single screw propeller that moved the ship at up to 11 knots (13 mph; 20 km/h). The steam for the engine was supplied by three single-ended Scotch marine boilers fitted for both coal and oil fuel.

== Operational history ==
Following delivery of the steamer and her acceptance by the USSB, she was allocated to Williams, Dimond & Co. to be used on The Pacific Coast to Europe routes. While in the Bay Area, the freighter loaded approximately 7,000 tons of merchandise consisting mostly of canned and dried fruit and vegetables in addition to 200,000 pounds of jute, 440,000 pounds of tallow and 170,000 gallons of wine and brandy and departed San Francisco on 28 August 1919 via Los Angeles where she took on additional 1,700 tons of canned goods. The freighter had to stay in Panama Canal Zone for about two weeks to undergo repairs and did not depart from Cristóbal until September 23. After unloading her cargo she departed Liverpool at the end of November and proceeded to Norfolk where she arrived on December 12 and was chartered for one trip by the U.S. Navy to transport coal to Pearl Harbor. Cansumset departed Norfolk on December 30 laden with 7,943 tons of coal and reached Hawaii on 29 January 1920.

Upon unloading the freighter sailed out for Puget Sound to load for another European trip but developed engine troubles and had to change her course for San Francisco. The ship eventually became nearly disabled about 250 miles from Cape Blanco but managed to limp into port on her own for repairs on 19 February 1920. After finalizing repairs, the ship departed San Francisco for Portland on March 11 loaded with European cargo transferred from her sister ship SS Eelbeck. Two days later she ran into a fifty-mile an hour gale almost in exact same position off Cape Blanco as last time. The vessel's engines again became disabled around 01:00 on March 13 and she drifted helplessly towards the shore for seven hours while her engineers were hard at work trying to fix the problems, while another steamer, SS President, was standing by ready to render assistance. Cansumset then proceeded to Portland and Seattle where she discharged her cargo and took on board approximately 1,700,000 feet of lumber destined for Balboa, Liverpool and Le Havre and about 700 tons of general merchandise. She then continued on to San Francisco, where she loaded 200,000 more feet of lumber for Havana and 300 more tons of miscellaneous cargo. After departing San Francisco, the vessel again started experiencing problems with her engines on April 1 while near Santa Cruz Island, and had to be put into San Pedro. She spent nearly three weeks there undergoing repairs to her turbines and eventually departed for her destinations on April 24. However, when about 1,900 miles south of San Pedro her turbines again broke down and she had to be towed by another USSB steamer SS Eastern Glade reaching Balboa on May 12 where she unloaded the bulk of her cargo of lumber.

Cansumset then spent more than a month undergoing repairs at Balboa which included complete replacement of her turbine with a brand new one sent from New York. She eventually sailed out in mid-June reaching Havana without any problems on June 21. However, because of a strike by Cuban workers the ship remained tied up in port for the next two months and her European cargo had to be transshipped via other vessels. She finally loaded up a cargo of sugar and sailed for New York reaching it on August 23. Once there, Williams, Dimond & Co. formally returned the vessel to the USSB as a failure due to their belief the ship would not be able to cover a great distance without experiencing yet another breakdown. In August 1920 USSB reallocated Cansumset to the Luckenbach Line to serve on the East Coast to Rotterdam route, however, these sailing never materialized and the freighter soon was sent to New London to be laid up on October 7.

From New London Cansumset was subsequently relocated with thirty five other ships to a resting ground off Prall's Island. In March 1921 an investigation by journalists exposed gross incompetence on the part of EFC in handling these laid up vessels. Due to close proximity of Grasselli Chemical Works the waters around the island were heavily polluted with acids resulting in fast corrosion of hulls and propellers of the ships. Ships were huddled together constantly hitting and grinding against each other resulting in damage to their hulls and superstructures. Cansumset was reported to be in dangerous condition and appeared to be strained amidships.

The vessel was eventually sold for breaking together with fifty nine other vessels in late 1930 to the Union Shipbuilding Company of Baltimore for US$16,160.
