= Alleway =

Alleway is a surname. Notable people with the surname include:

- Laura Alleway (born 1989), Australian football player
- Rebecca Alleway, English set decorator

== See also ==
- Alloway (disambiguation)
