= Bowling, Tennessee =

Unincorporated community in Tennessee, US

Coordinates: 35°56′40″N 84°56′45″W

Bowling is an unincorporated community in Cumberland County, Tennessee, in the United States.

The community was named for Rodney Bowling, a pioneer settler.
