= O-Zone (disambiguation) =

O-Zone is a Moldovan pop group.

O-Zone may also refer to:

- The O-Zone, a music show
- O-Zone (novel), a 1986 novel by Paul Theroux

== See also ==
- Ozone (disambiguation)
