= Bowman, Tennessee =

- Census-designated place
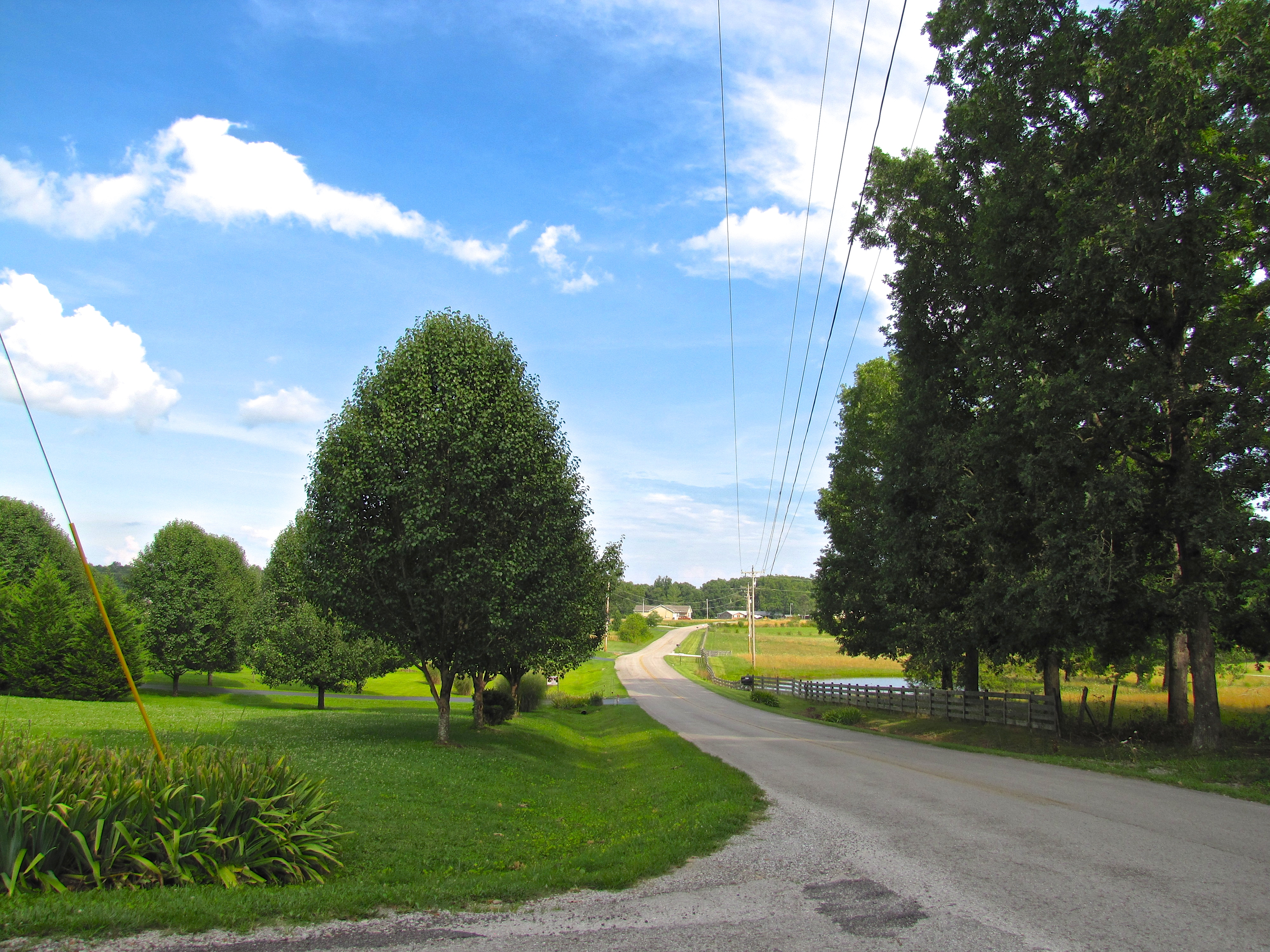
- Bowman Loop Road in Bowman

- Location within Tennessee
- Coordinates: 36°03′40″N 85°01′42″W
- Country: United States
- State: Tennessee
- County: Cumberland

Area
  - Total: 2.29 sq mi (5.93 km^{2})
  - Land: 2.29 sq mi (5.93 km^{2})
  - Water: 0 sq mi (0.00 km^{2})
- Elevation: 1,811 ft (552 m)

Population (2020)
  - Total: 297
  - Density: 129.8/sq mi (50.11/km^{2})
- Time zone: UTC-6 (Central (CST))
  - Summer (DST): UTC-5 (CDT)
- ZIP code: 38571
- Area code: 931
- GNIS feature ID: 1646854

Bowman is a census-designated place and unincorporated community in Cumberland County, Tennessee, United States. It is located off U.S. Route 127 north of Crossville, south of Clarkrange, and west of the Catoosa Wildlife Management Area. Its population was 302 as of the 2010 census.

The community was named for Nathaniel Bowman, a pioneer settler.

== Demographics ==
Historical population
Census	Pop.	Note	%±
2010	302		—
2020	297		−1.7%
U.S. Decennial Census
