= Penton, New Jersey =

Populated place in Salem County, New Jersey, US

- Unincorporated community
- Penton's location in Salem County (Inset: Salem County in New Jersey) Penton, New Jersey (New Jersey) Penton, New Jersey (the United States)
- Coordinates: 39°34′42″N 75°24′06″W
- Country: United States
- State: New Jersey
- County: Salem
- Township: Alloway
- Named after: Daniel or Abner Penton
- Elevation: 33 ft (10 m)
- Time zone: UTC−05:00 (Eastern (EST))
  - Summer (DST): UTC−04:00 (EDT)
- GNIS feature ID: 879226

Penton is an unincorporated community located within Alloway Township in Salem County, in the U.S. state of New Jersey. The community is the site of the historic Penton Chapel.

== History ==
William Penton received 500 acres (200 ha) of land from John Fenwick. William and Daniel Penton lived on a section of this land. The area was later named after a Penton family member (either Daniel or Abner), and was known as Penton Abbey, Pentonville, and Penton. Burton Penton, who died there around 1795, stated Guineatown was the name of the village. His granddaughter suggested the name Penton when the post office was established.

The village was known for its brickyards. Some early ones were established by Jacob Thackra, John Bee, and Smith B. Sickler.

An 1834 survey suggested the town was mostly inhabited by African Americans.
