= Midway, Cumberland County, Tennessee =

Midway
- Unincorporated community
- Location within Tennessee Location within the United States
- Coordinates: 35°49′49″N 85°10′45″W
- Country: United States
- State: Tennessee
- County: Cumberland
- Elevation: 2,021 ft (616 m)
- Time zone: UTC-6 (Central (CST))
  - Summer (DST): UTC-5 (CDT)
- Area code: 931
- GNIS feature ID: 1646858

Midway is an unincorporated community in Cumberland County, Tennessee. Midway is 11.8 miles (19.0 km) southwest of Crossville.
