= Ozone Falls State Natural Area =

Waterfall and park in Tennessee

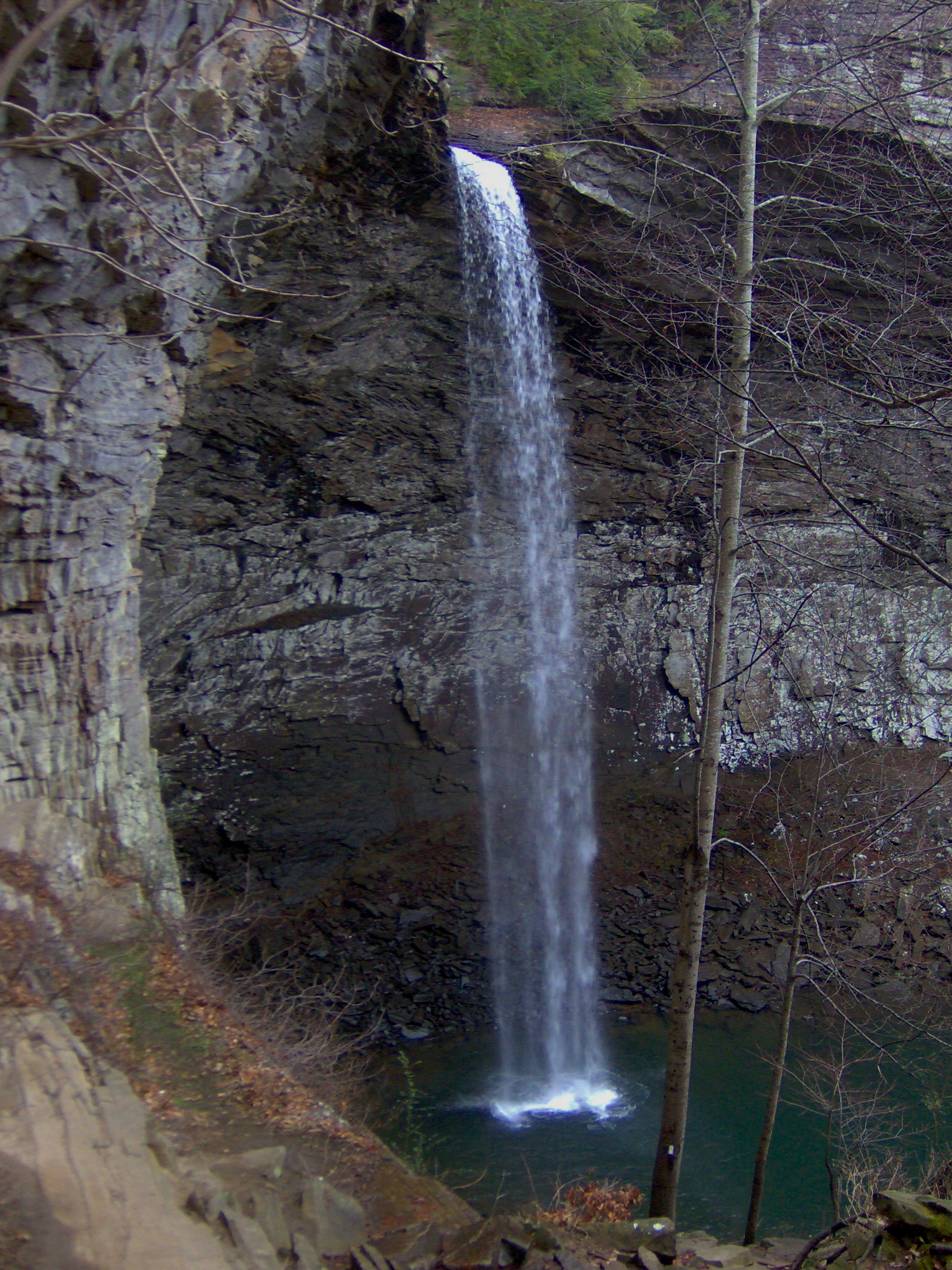
- Ozone Falls

- Location within Tennessee
- Location: Cumberland County, Tennessee
- Nearest town: Crab Orchard, Tennessee
- Coordinates: 35.88045°N 84.81001°W
- Area: 43 acres (17 ha)
- Established: 1973
- Owner: Tennessee Department of Environment and Conservation (TDEC)
- Administrator: Cumberland Mountain State Park
- Website: http://www.tennessee.gov/environment/article/na-na-ozone-falls

Ozone Falls State Natural Area is a state natural area in Cumberland County, Tennessee in the southeastern United States. It consists of 43 acres (0.17 km^{2}) centered on Ozone Falls, a 110-foot (34 m) plunge waterfall, and its immediate gorge along Fall Creek. Because of its picturesque beauty and easy access, Disney selected Ozone Falls for scenes for their live-action film "Rudyard Kipling's The Jungle Book". The area is managed by the Tennessee Department of Environment and Conservation and maintained by Cumberland Mountain State Park. It is also part of Cumberland Trail State Park.

== Geographical setting ==
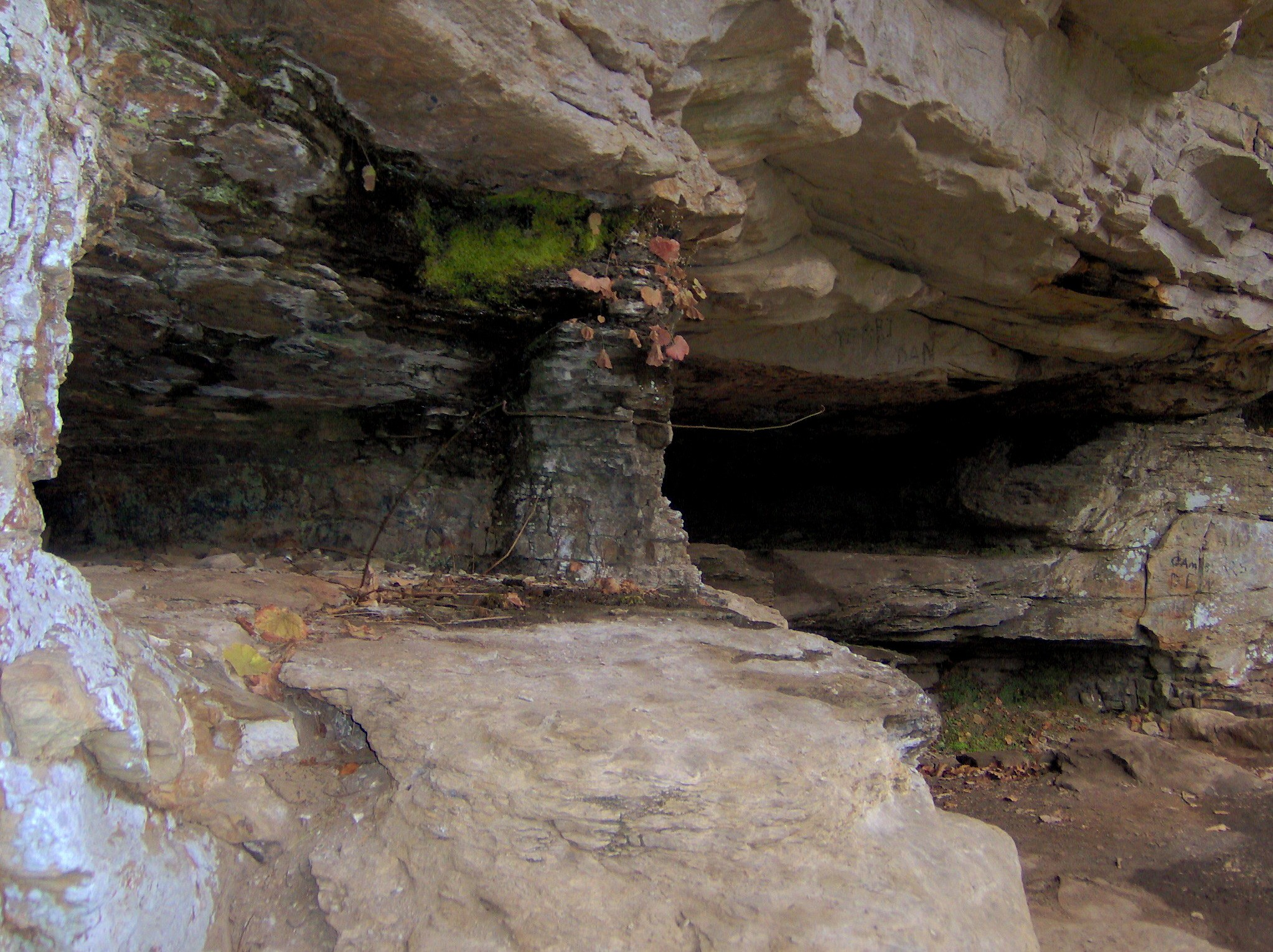
Gambler's Den, just above the gorge

Ozone Falls is situated along Fall Creek, which drains a short section of the Cumberland Plateau between the Crab Orchard Mountains to the west and Walden Ridge to the east. The creek flows down from its source high in the Crab Orchard Mountains for a mile or so before steadying briefly as it enters the community of Ozone. it then enters the state natural area just after passing under U.S. Route 70, which runs perpendicular to it. It spills over Ozone Falls a few hundred meters south of US-70.

Beyond Ozone Falls, the creek slices through a small gorge and proceeds southward for several more miles before emptying into Piney Creek. The confluence of the creeks occurs at a point where Roane County, Cumberland County and Rhea County all meet. Fall Creek is part of the Tennessee River watershed.

The Fall Creek that spills over Ozone Falls is not the same stream as the Fall Creek that spills over Fall Creek Falls in Van Buren County; the latter is part of the Cumberland River watershed.

== Features ==
The Ozone Falls State Natural Area consists of Ozone Falls and the gorge immediately downstream. The gorge area around the waterfall's plungepool slopes inward from the top edge, creating a half-dome shape along the gorge's walls. Short hiking trails allow access to the waterfall's overhang and plungepool, as well as the cliffs above the gorge. The trailhead is located along US-70.

== History ==
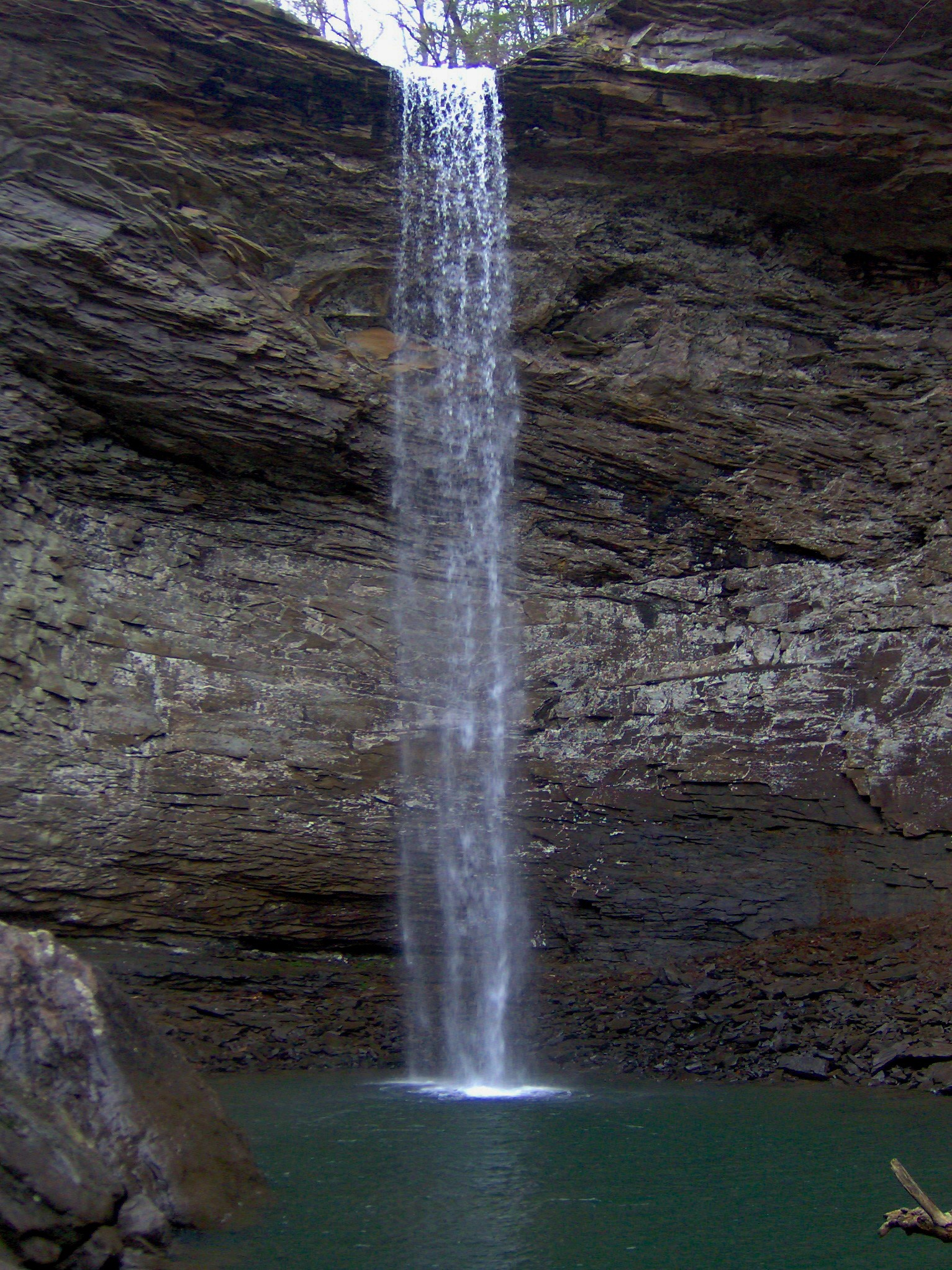
Ozone Falls, viewed from the base of the gorge

Migrants crossing the Cumberland Plateau en route to the Nashville area in the early 19th century wrote of Ozone Falls in journals and letters sent to relatives back home. The waterfall was located adjacent to the Walton Road, which was part of the stage route connecting East and Middle Tennessee (the road closely paralleled what is now US-70). One traveler along this road, Elijah Haley, died while passing through the area in 1806. His widow established a tavern at what is now the community of Ozone shortly thereafter, and later helped operate the Crab Orchard Inn at Crab Orchard, a few miles to the west.

The waterfall was known as McNair Falls throughout the 19th century, named after a local miller who operated a grist mill at the waterfall in the 1860s. In 1896, the community of Mammy, which had grown up around the Haley tavern, changed its name to Ozone, and the name was subsequently applied to the waterfall. The name reflected the high quality of air in the community, which may have been enhanced by the waterfall's mists.

The Ozone Falls State Natural Area was established in 1973, and originally consisted of 14 acres (57,000 m^{2}). In 1996, it was expanded to 43 acres (170,000 m^{2}).

== See also ==
- Burgess Falls State Park
- Cummins Falls State Park
