= Ozon (disambiguation) =

Ozon is a Russian e-commerce company

Ozon may also refer to:

== Places ==
- Ozon, Ardèche, a commune in the department of Ardèche, France
- Ozon, Hautes-Pyrénées, a commune in the department of Hautes-Pyrénées, France

== People ==
- Abuaihuda Ozon, Syrian weightlifter
- François Ozon, a French film director and screenwriter
- Titus Ozon a Romanian soccer player of the second half of 20th century

== Other ==
- Ozon Radio, Serbian radio station
- Obóz Zjednoczenia Narodowego, a Polish political party
- Ozon Arena, football stadium in Krasnodar, Russia

== See also ==
- Ozone (disambiguation)
