= Maylands =

Maylands may refer to:

- Maylands, South Australia, a suburb of Adelaide
- Maylands, Western Australia, a suburb of Perth
- Electoral district of Maylands, an electorate of the Western Australian Legislative Assembly

== See also ==
- Mayland (disambiguation)
