= Ozone Falls =

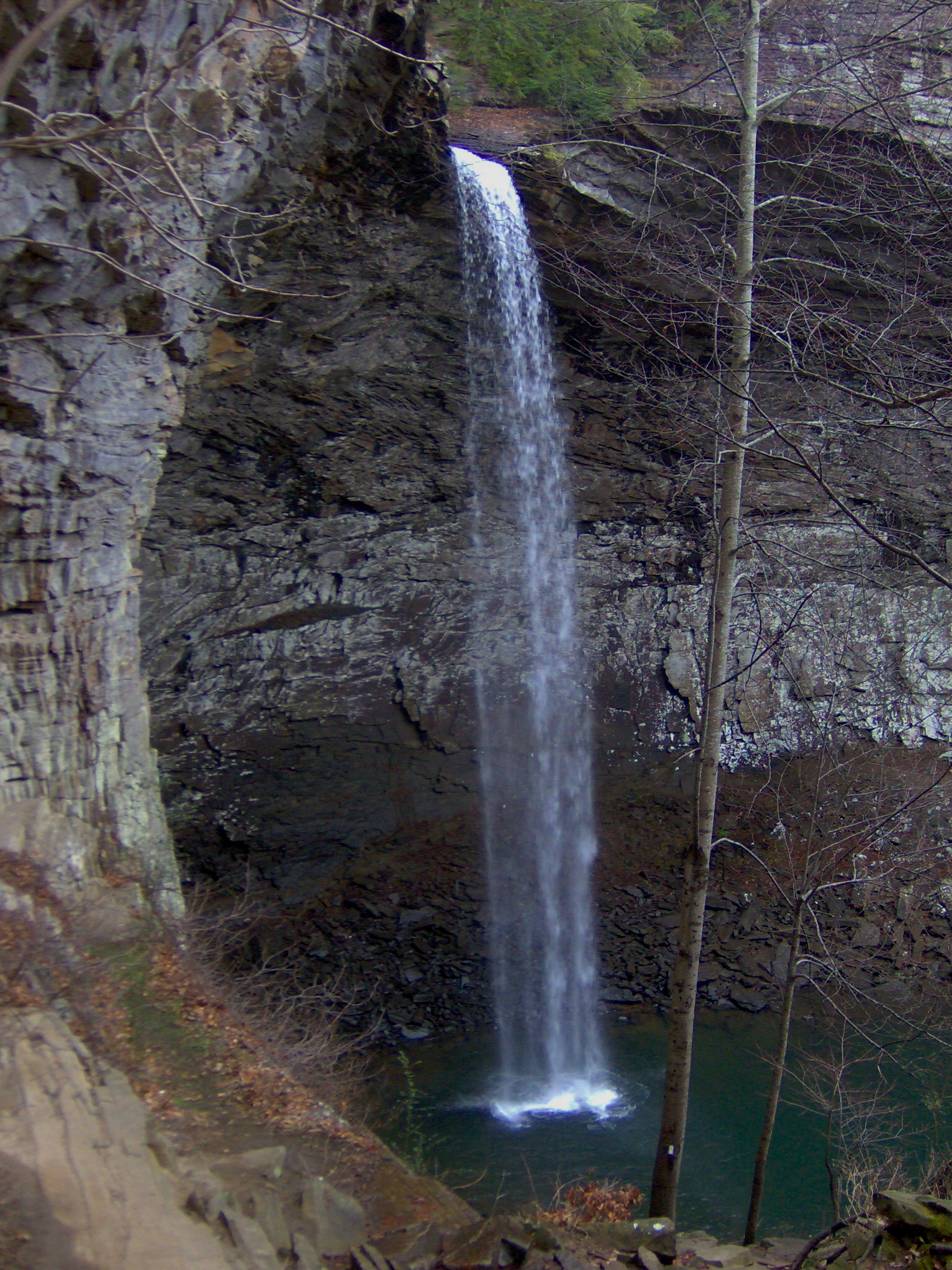
- Ozone Falls
- Interactive map of Ozone Falls
- Location: Cumberland County, Tennessee
- Coordinates: 35.88045°N 84.81001°W
- Type: Plunge
- Total height: 110 feet (34 m)
- Watercourse: Fall Creek

Ozone Falls is a waterfall located in Cumberland County, Tennessee in the Ozone Falls State Natural Area and Cumberland Trail State Park. Ozone Falls is situated along Fall Creek, which drains a short section of the Cumberland Plateau between the Crab Orchard Mountains to the west and Walden Ridge to the east. The creek flows down from its source high in the Crab Orchard Mountains for a mile or so before steadying briefly as it enters the community of Ozone. Fall Creek enters the state natural area just after it passes under U.S. Route 70, which runs perpendicular to it. The creek spills over Ozone Falls a few hundred meters south of US-70. The trailhead is located along US-70.

== See also ==
- List of waterfalls
