= USS Alloway =

Two ships of the United States Navy have been named Alloway. The word Alloway is a Delaware Indian term meaning "beautiful tail" and refers to the black fox.

- USS Alloway (ID-3139), a cargo ship in commission from 1918 to 1919 that later operated commercially as SS Alloway
- USS Alloway (YT-170), a tug in commission from 1940 to 1946
