= Aldine, New Jersey =

Populated place in Salem County, New Jersey, US

- Unincorporated community
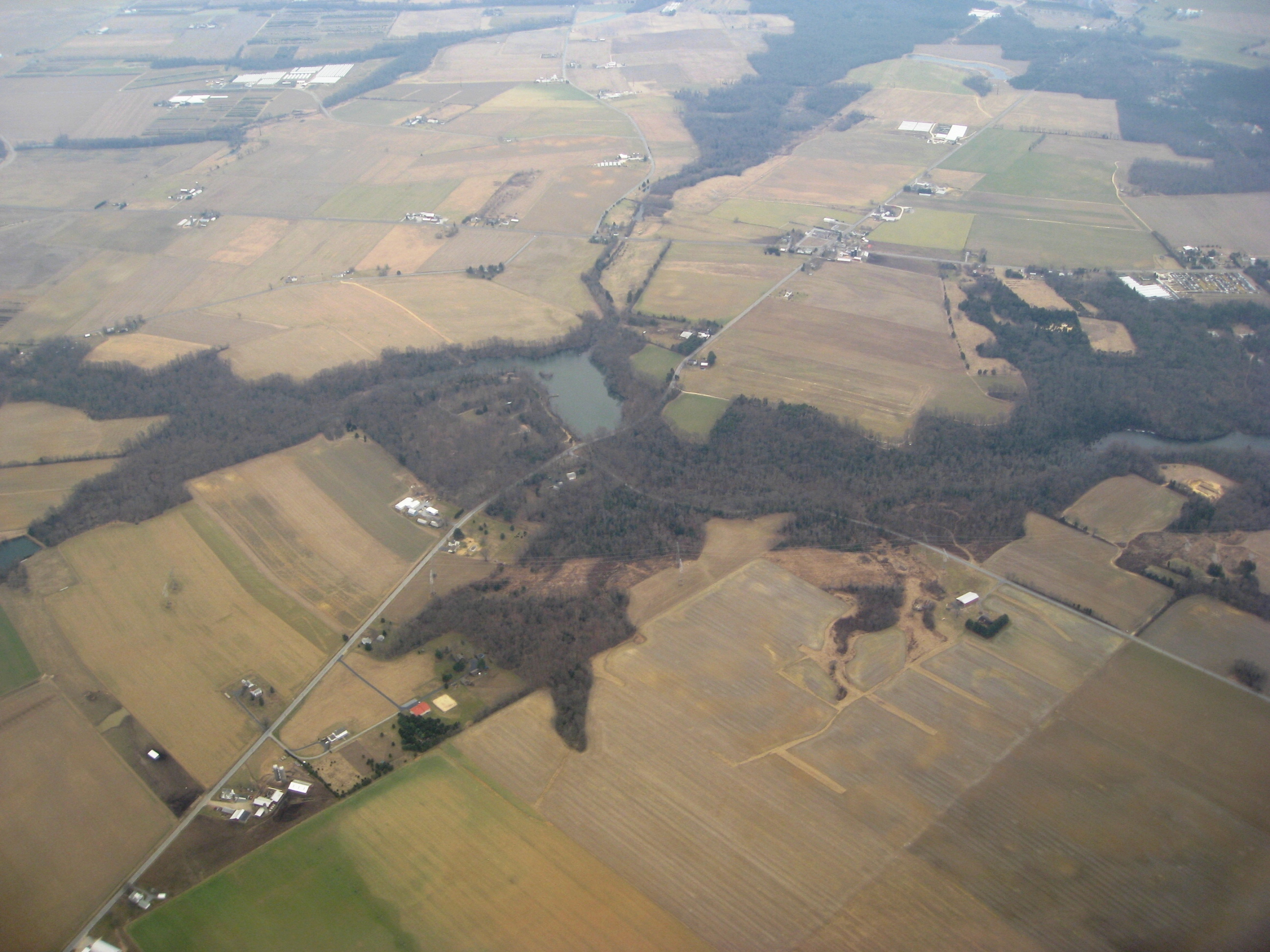
- Aerial view of Aldine (Aldine is located in the top middle/middle/right around the road crossing)

- Location in Salem County Location in New Jersey Location in the United States
- Coordinates: 39°34′08″N 75°16′30″W
- Country: United States
- State: New Jersey
- County: Salem
- Township: Alloway
- Elevation: 128 ft (39 m)
- Time zone: UTC−05:00 (Eastern (EST))
  - Summer (DST): UTC−04:00 (EDT)
- GNIS feature ID: 874278

Aldine is an unincorporated community located within Alloway Township in Salem County, in the U.S. state of New Jersey. It is located at the crossroads of Salem County routes 611 and 635. The village includes several houses, farms and the Aldine United Methodist Church, which was built in 1868, and underwent many renovations. The church has an Elmer mailing address, but is located in the Aldine section of Alloway Township.

Aldine was known as Nazareth until about 1869. It was also known as Watson's Corner. The name Aldine was given at the time the post office was established.
