= Stone Memorial High School =

Public high school in Tennessee, United States

Coordinates: 35.98412°N 85.00777°W

Location
- 2800 Cook Road; Crossville, (Cumberland County), Tennessee 38571; United States

Information
- Type: Public high school
- Principal: Kelly Smith
- Staff: 61.00 (FTE)
- Enrollment: 1,031 (2022-23)
- Student to teacher ratio: 16.90
- Colors: Black and gold
- Nickname: Panthers
- Website: https://stonehighcumberlandtn.schoolinsites.com/

Stone Memorial High School (SMHS) is one of two high schools in the Cumberland County School District and is in Crossville, Tennessee.

According to U.S. News & World Report, "The AP® participation rate at Stone Memorial High School is 27 percent. The student body makeup is 53 percent male and 47 percent female, and the total minority enrollment is 6 percent." They have 1,053 students and 66 teachers.
