= Dickinson House (Alloway, New Jersey) =

Historic house in New Jersey, United States

- U.S. National Register of Historic Places
- New Jersey Register of Historic Places
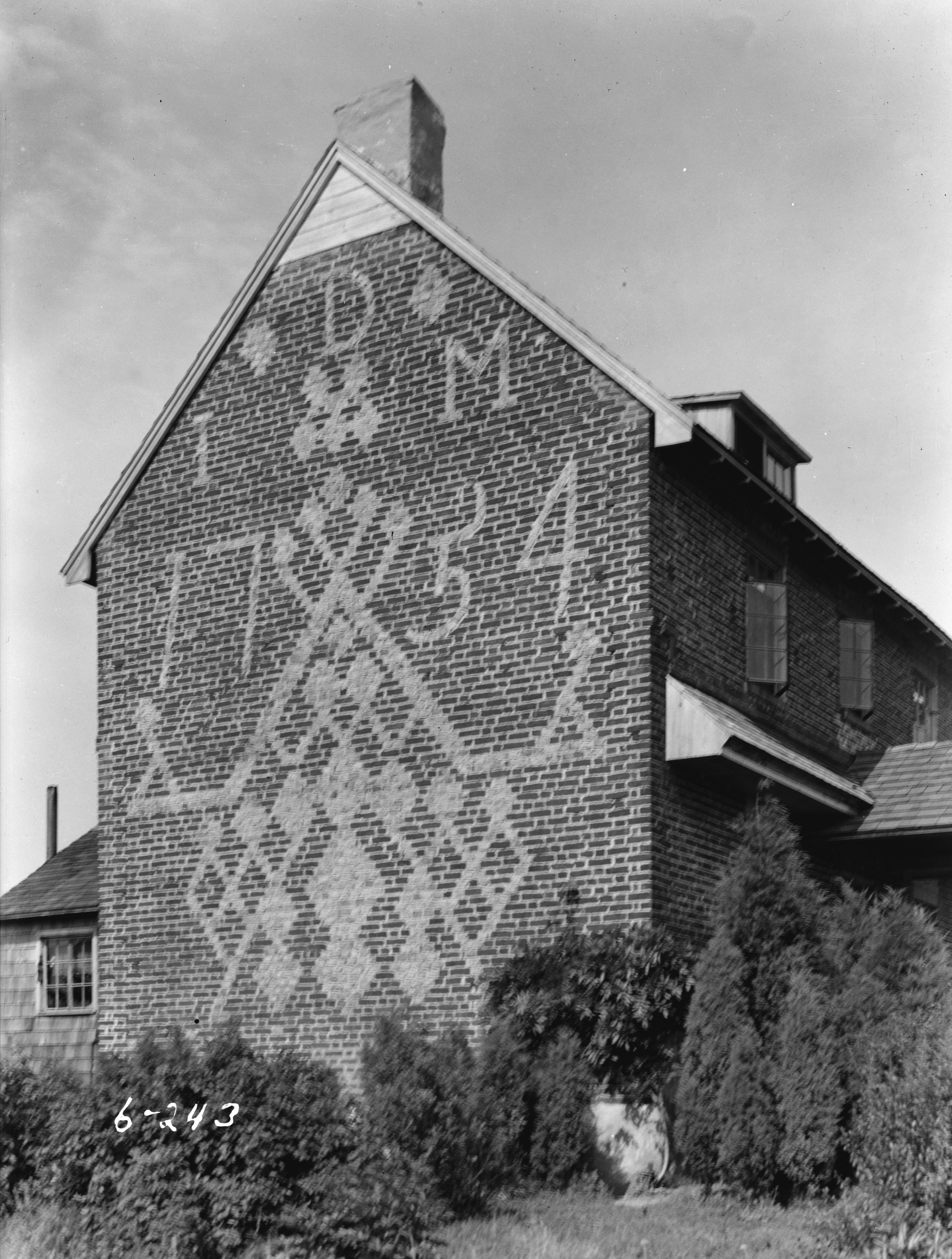
- HABS photo from 1936

- Location within Salem County, New Jersey Location within New Jersey Location within the United States
- Nearest city: Alloway Township, New Jersey
- Coordinates: 39°36′1″N 75°20′2″W
- Built: 1754
- NRHP reference No.: 75001156
- NJRHP No.: 2428

Significant dates
- Added to NRHP: February 20, 1975
- Designated NJRHP: August 10, 1973

Dickinson House is located on Brickyard Road in Alloway Township of Salem County, New Jersey, United States. The house was built in 1754 and was documented by the Historic American Buildings Survey (HABS) in 1939. The house was added to the National Register of Historic Places on February 20, 1975, for its significance in architecture.

== History and description ==
The two and one-half story brick house was built in 1754 by John Dickinson, who was a great, great, grandson of John Fenwick, a Quaker who settled here in 1675. John and Mary Dickinson's initials and house date are shown on the south gable. The patterned brickwork features ornate shapes in blue glazed brick and has been described as "almost baroque in design and absolutely unique" according to the nomination form.

== See also ==
- National Register of Historic Places listings in Salem County, New Jersey
- List of the oldest buildings in New Jersey

External image
- 1930s-1940s Post Card, courtesy of West Jersey History Project
