= Alloways Creek Township, New Jersey =

Coordinates: 39.506424°N 75.456848°W

Alloways Creek Township is a defunct municipality in Salem County, New Jersey, United States.

The Township was first mentioned in official records as of May 12, 1701, though the exact date of incorporation is unknown. The Township survived until June 17, 1767, when it was split into Lower Alloways Creek Township and Upper Alloways Creek Township (now known as Alloway Township).
