= Alloway Township, New Jersey =

Township in Salem County, New Jersey, US

- Township
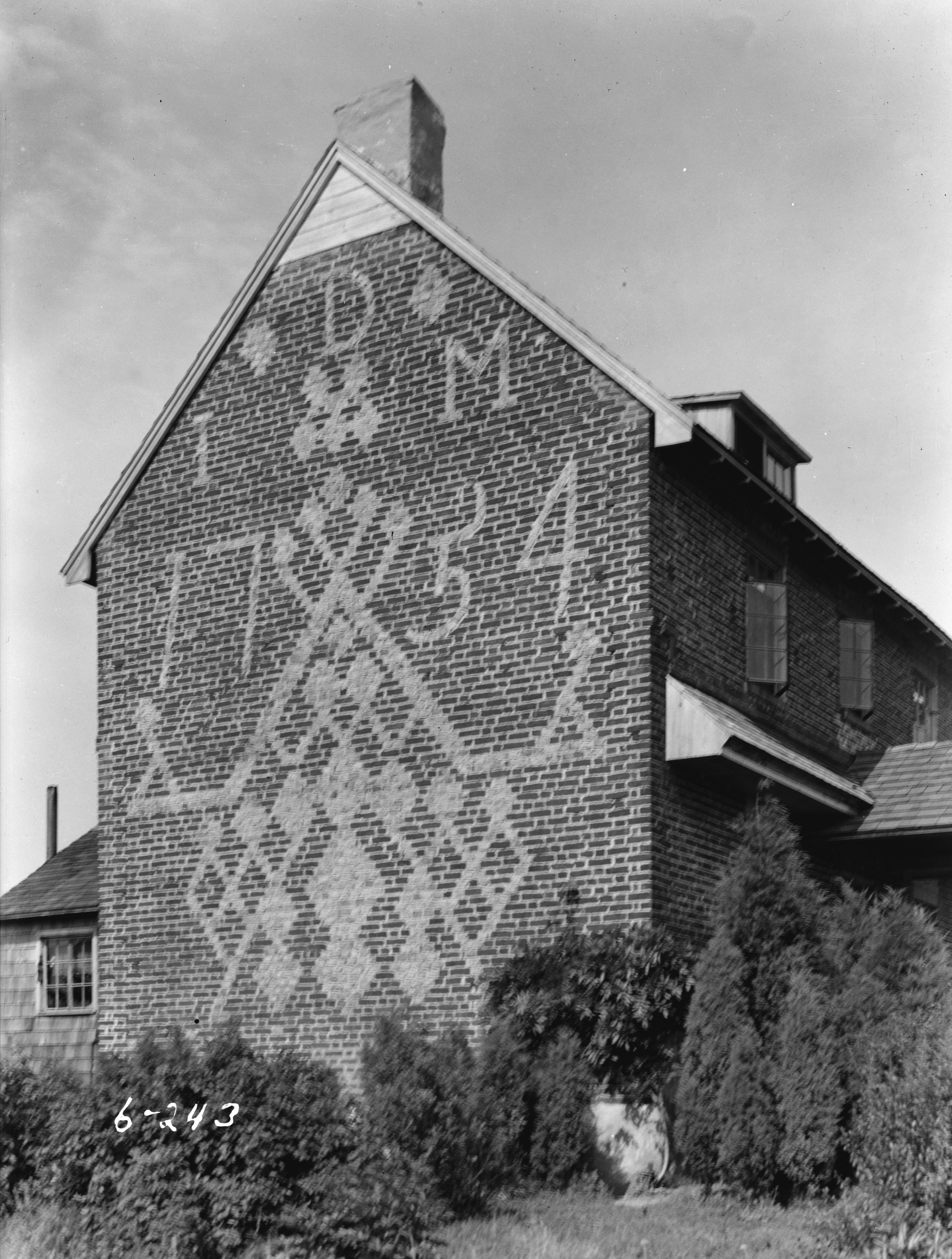
- Dickenson House

- Seal

- Alloway Township highlighted in Salem County. Inset map: Salem County highlighted in the State of New Jersey.

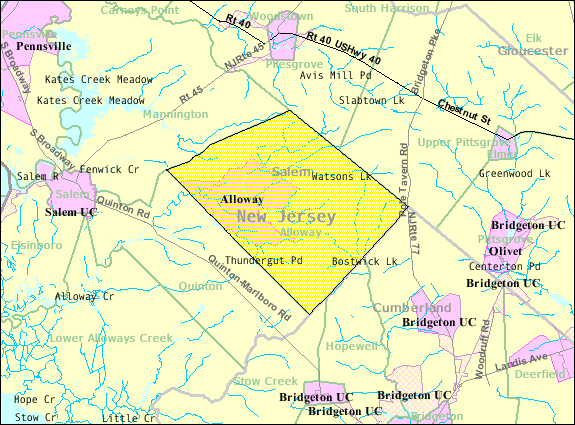
- Census Bureau map of Alloway Township, New Jersey

- Location in Salem County Location in New Jersey Location in the United States
- Coordinates: 39.562311°N 75.310603°W
- Country: United States
- State: New Jersey
- County: Salem
- Royal charter: June 17, 1767, as Upper Alloways Creek Township
- Incorporated: February 21, 1798
- Renamed: February 21, 1884, as Alloway Township
- Named after: Native American Chief Alloway

Government
  - Type: Township
  - Body: Township Committee
  - Mayor: P. Ed McKelvey (R, term ends December 31, 2026)
  - Administrator / Municipal clerk: Charlet Cheeseman

Area
  - Total: 33.92 sq mi (87.84 km^{2})
  - Land: 33.48 sq mi (86.70 km^{2})
  - Water: 0.44 sq mi (1.13 km^{2}) 1.29%
  - Rank: 71st of 565 in state 6th of 15 in county
- Elevation: 62 ft (19 m)

Population (2020)
  - Total: 3,283
  - Estimate (2023): 3,319
  - Rank: 435th of 565 in state 9th of 15 in county
  - Density: 98.1/sq mi (37.9/km^{2})
  - Rank: 542nd of 565 in state 10th of 15 in county
- Time zone: UTC−05:00 (Eastern (EST))
  - Summer (DST): UTC−04:00 (Eastern (EDT))
- ZIP Code: 08001
- Area codes: 856 exchanges: 339, 878, 935
- FIPS code: 3403300880
- GNIS feature ID: 00882131
- Website: www.allowaytownship.com

Alloway Township is a township in Salem County, in the U.S. state of New Jersey. As of the 2020 United States census, the township's population was 3,283, a decrease of 184 (−5.3%) from the 2010 census count of 3,467, which in turn reflected an increase of 693 (+25.0%) from the 2,774 counted in the 2000 census.

== History ==
What is now Alloway was formally incorporated as Upper Alloways Creek Township by a Royal charter granted on June 17, 1767, from portions of the now-defunct Alloways Creek Township. The township was formally incorporated by an act of the New Jersey Legislature on February 21, 1798. Quinton Township was formed from portions of the township on February 18, 1873. The name was officially changed to Alloway Township as of February 21, 1884.

The name Alloway is derivative of Allowas, a local Native American chief.

Ranch Hope, a nonprofit organization founded in 1962 by Reverend David L. Bailey Sr. and Eileen Bailey, provides behavioral health care, education, short-term shelter care, supportive housing and adventure-based services for thousands of children and families annually on a 100-acre (40 ha) campus in the township.

== Geography ==
According to the United States Census Bureau, the township had a total area of 33.91 square miles (87.84 km^{2}), including 33.48 square miles (86.70 km^{2}) of land and 0.44 square miles (1.13 km^{2}) of water (1.29%).

Alloway (with a 2010 Census population of 1,402) is an unincorporated community and census-designated place (CDP) located within Alloway Township. Other unincorporated communities, localities and place names located partially or completely within the township include Aldine, Alloway Junction, Dilkes Mile, Friesburg, Lake Sycamore, Mower, New Boston, Oakland, Penton, Remsterville, Riddleton and Watsons Mills.

The township borders Mannington Township, Pilesgrove Township, Quinton Township and Upper Pittsgrove Township in Salem County; and Hopewell Township, Stow Creek Township and Upper Deerfield Township in Cumberland County.

== Demographics ==
Historical population
Census	Pop.	Note	%±
1810	1,921		—
1820	2,194		14.2%
1830	2,136		−2.6%
1840	2,235		4.6%
1850	2,530		13.2%
1860	2,899		14.6%
1870	3,062		5.6%
1880	1,917	*	−37.4%
1890	1,675		−12.6%
1900	1,528		−8.8%
1910	1,533		0.3%
1920	1,431		−6.7%
1930	1,575		10.1%
1940	1,705		8.3%
1950	1,792		5.1%
1960	2,226		24.2%
1970	2,550		14.6%
1980	2,680		5.1%
1990	2,795		4.3%
2000	2,774		−0.8%
2010	3,467		25.0%
2020	3,283		−5.3%
2023 (est.)	3,319	▲	1.1%
Population sources: 1810–2000; 1810–1920 1840 1850–1870; 1850 1870 1880–1890; 1890–1910 1910–1930; 1940–2000 2000; 2010 2020 * = Lost territory in previous decade.

=== 2010 census ===
The 2010 United States census counted 3,467 people, 1,193 households, and 945 families in the township. The population density was 103.8 inhabitants per square mile (40.1/km^{2}). There were 1,268 housing units at an average density of 38.0 per square mile (14.7/km^{2}). The racial makeup was 91.49% (3,172) White, 5.08% (176) Black or African American, 0.43% (15) Native American, 0.89% (31) Asian, 0.00% (0) Pacific Islander, 0.61% (21) from other races, and 1.50% (52) from two or more races. Hispanic or Latino of any race were 1.96% (68) of the population.

Of the 1,193 households, 34.5% had children under the age of 18; 67.6% were married couples living together; 6.3% had a female householder with no husband present and 20.8% were non-families. Of all households, 17.4% were made up of individuals and 8.0% had someone living alone who was 65 years of age or older. The average household size was 2.84 and the average family size was 3.21.

26.2% of the population were under the age of 18, 7.8% from 18 to 24, 23.2% from 25 to 44, 30.8% from 45 to 64, and 11.9% who were 65 years of age or older. The median age was 40.1 years. For every 100 females, the population had 101.9 males. For every 100 females ages 18 and older there were 102.5 males.

The Census Bureau's 2006–2010 American Community Survey showed that (in 2010 inflation-adjusted dollars) median household income was $86,979 (with a margin of error of +/− $8,158) and the median family income was $91,979 (+/− $8,633). Males had a median income of $61,544 (+/− $11,567) versus $35,528 (+/− $2,497) for females. The per capita income for the borough was $27,649 (+/− $2,963). About 4.6% of families and 5.6% of the population were below the poverty line, including 3.9% of those under age 18 and 19.1% of those age 65 or over.

=== 2000 census ===
As of the 2000 United States census there were 2,774 people, 948 households, and 742 families residing in the township. The population density was 84.5 inhabitants per square mile (32.6/km^{2}). There were 995 housing units at an average density of 30.3 per square mile (11.7/km^{2}). The racial makeup of the township was 90.70% White, 6.89% African American, 0.54% Native American, 0.43% Asian, 0.40% from other races, and 1.05% from two or more races. Hispanic or Latino of any race were 2.38% of the population.

There were 948 households, out of which 36.0% had children under the age of 18 living with them, 66.8% were married couples living together, 7.0% had a female householder with no husband present, and 21.7% were non-families. 18.7% of all households were made up of individuals, and 8.2% had someone living alone who was 65 years of age or older. The average household size was 2.80 and the average family size was 3.19.

In the township the population was spread out, with 28.1% under the age of 18, 6.8% from 18 to 24, 29.0% from 25 to 44, 23.8% from 45 to 64, and 12.4% who were 65 years of age or older. The median age was 37 years. For every 100 females, there were 103.5 males. For every 100 females age 18 and over, there were 105.0 males.

The median income for a household in the township was $56,528, and the median income for a family was $65,132. Males had a median income of $43,839 versus $27,188 for females. The per capita income for the township was $22,935. About 4.5% of families and 8.2% of the population were below the poverty line, including 8.1% of those under age 18 and 4.6% of those age 65 or over.

== Government ==
=== Local government ===
Alloway is governed under the township form of New Jersey municipal government. The township is one of 141 municipalities (of the 564) statewide that use this form of government. The Township Committee is comprised of three members, who are elected directly by the voters at-large in partisan elections to serve three-year terms of office on a staggered basis, with one seat coming up for election each year as part of the November general election. At an annual reorganization meeting, the council selects one of its members to serves as mayor and another as deputy mayor.

As of 2022, the Alloway Township Committee consists of Mayor P. Ed McKelvey (R, term on committee ends December 31, 2024; term as mayor ends 2023), Deputy Mayor K. Myrle Patrick (R, term on committee ends 2022; term as deputy mayor ends 2020) and Warren Morgan III (D, 2023).

=== Federal, state and county representation ===
Alloway Township is located in the 2nd Congressional district and is part of New Jersey's 3rd state legislative district

For the 119th United States Congress, New Jersey's 2nd congressional district is represented by Jeff Van Drew (R, Dennis Township). New Jersey is represented in the United States Senate by Democrats Cory Booker (Newark, term ends 2027) and Andy Kim (Moorestown, term ends 2031).

For the 2026–2027 session, the 3rd legislative district of the New Jersey Legislature is represented in the State Senate by John Burzichelli (D, Paulsboro) and in the General Assembly by David Bailey (D, Woodstown) and Heather Simmons (D, Glassboro).

Salem County is governed by a five-member Board of County Commissioners who are elected at-large to serve three-year terms of office on a staggered basis, with either one or two seats coming up for election each year. At an annual reorganization meeting held in the beginning of January, the board selects a Director and a Deputy Director from among its members. As of 2025, Salem County's Commissioners (with party, residence, and term-end year listed in parentheses) are:

Director Benjamin H. Laury (R, Elmer, 2027), Deputy Director Cordy Taylor (R, Oldmans Township, 2028), Paul Collier (R, Lower Alloways Creek, 2027), Ed Ramsey (R, Pittsgrove Township, 2026), and Daniel Timmerman (R, Elmer, 2028).

Constitutional officers elected on a countywide basis are: Clerk Dale A. Cross (R, Pennsville Township, 2029), Sheriff Charles M. Miller (R, Salem, 2027) and Surrogate Gordon J. Ostrum Jr. (R, Pilesgrove Township, 2030).

=== Politics ===
As of March 2011, there were a total of 2,269 registered voters in Alloway Township, of which 509 (22.4% vs. 30.6% countywide) were registered as Democrats, 596 (26.3% vs. 21.0%) were registered as Republicans and 1,163 (51.3% vs. 48.4%) were registered as Unaffiliated. There was one voter registered to another party. Among the township's 2010 Census population, 65.4% (vs. 64.6% in Salem County) were registered to vote, including 88.7% of those ages 18 and over (vs. 84.4% countywide).

Gubernatorial election results for Alloway Township
Year	Republican		Democratic		Third party(ies)	
Year	No.	%	No.	%	No.	%
2025	1,028	66.93%	499	32.49%	9	0.59%
2021	998	75.49%	313	23.68%	11	0.83%
2017	642	55.87%	462	40.21%	45	3.92%
2013	770	68.14%	314	27.79%	46	4.07%
2009	660	55.84%	368	31.13%	154	13.03%
2005	676	56.76%	443	37.20%	72	6.05%

In the 2012 presidential election, Republican Mitt Romney received 58.5% of the vote (1,019 cast), ahead of Democrat Barack Obama with 39.7% (691 votes), and other candidates with 1.8% (31 votes), among the 1,754 ballots cast by the township's 2,412 registered voters (13 ballots were spoiled), for a turnout of 72.7%. In the 2008 presidential election, Republican John McCain received 1,011 votes (56.5% vs. 46.6% countywide), ahead of Democrat Barack Obama with 731 votes (40.8% vs. 50.4%) and other candidates with 32 votes (1.8% vs. 1.6%), among the 1,790 ballots cast by the township's 2,312 registered voters, for a turnout of 77.4% (vs. 71.8% in Salem County). In the 2004 presidential election, Republican George W. Bush received 1,060 votes (62.6% vs. 52.5% countywide), ahead of Democrat John Kerry with 609 votes (36.0% vs. 45.9%) and other candidates with 15 votes (0.9% vs. 1.0%), among the 1,693 ballots cast by the township's 2,172 registered voters, for a turnout of 77.9% (vs. 71.0% in the whole county).

United States presidential election results for Alloway Township 2024 2020 2016 2012 2008 2004
Year	Republican		Democratic		Third party(ies)	
Year	No.	%	No.	%	No.	%
2024	1,343	68.52%	586	29.90%	31	1.58%
2020	1,376	65.93%	684	32.77%	27	1.29%
2016	1,096	64.17%	521	30.50%	91	5.33%
2012	1,019	58.53%	691	39.69%	31	1.78%
2008	1,011	56.99%	731	41.21%	32	1.80%
2004	1,060	62.95%	609	36.16%	15	0.89%

In the 2013 gubernatorial election, Republican Chris Christie received 68.1% of the vote (770 cast), ahead of Democrat Barbara Buono with 27.8% (314 votes), and other candidates with 4.1% (46 votes), among the 1,138 ballots cast by the township's 2,397 registered voters (8 ballots were spoiled), for a turnout of 47.5%. In the 2009 gubernatorial election, Republican Chris Christie received 660 votes (55.4% vs. 46.1% countywide), ahead of Democrat Jon Corzine with 368 votes (30.9% vs. 39.9%), Independent Chris Daggett with 137 votes (11.5% vs. 9.7%) and other candidates with 17 votes (1.4% vs. 2.0%), among the 1,192 ballots cast by the township's 2,302 registered voters, yielding a 51.8% turnout (vs. 47.3% in the county).

United States Senate election results for Alloway Township1
Year	Republican		Democratic		Third party(ies)	
Year	No.	%	No.	%	No.	%
2024	1,282	66.18%	621	32.06%	34	1.76%
2018	998	65.14%	470	30.68%	64	4.18%
2012	912	53.46%	731	42.85%	63	3.69%
2006	714	59.06%	450	37.22%	45	3.72%

United States Senate election results for Alloway Township2
Year	Republican		Democratic		Third party(ies)	
Year	No.	%	No.	%	No.	%
2020	1,326	64.37%	676	32.82%	58	2.82%
2014	643	61.30%	372	35.46%	34	3.24%
2013	414	68.77%	182	30.23%	6	1.00%
2008	902	51.69%	763	43.72%	80	4.58%

== Education ==
The Alloway Township School District serves students in public school for pre-kindergarten through eighth grade at Alloway Township School. As of the 2021–22 school year, the district, comprised of one school, had an enrollment of 289 students and 25.2 classroom teachers (on an FTE basis), for a student–teacher ratio of 11.5:1.

Students in public school for ninth through twelfth grades attend Woodstown High School in Woodstown, which serves students from Pilesgrove Township and Woodstown, along with students from Alloway Township, Oldmans Township and Upper Pittsgrove Township who attend the high school as part of sending/receiving relationships with the Woodstown-Pilesgrove Regional School District. As of the 2021–22 school year, the high school had an enrollment of 559 students and 49.7 classroom teachers (on an FTE basis), for a student–teacher ratio of 11.2:1.

== Transportation ==
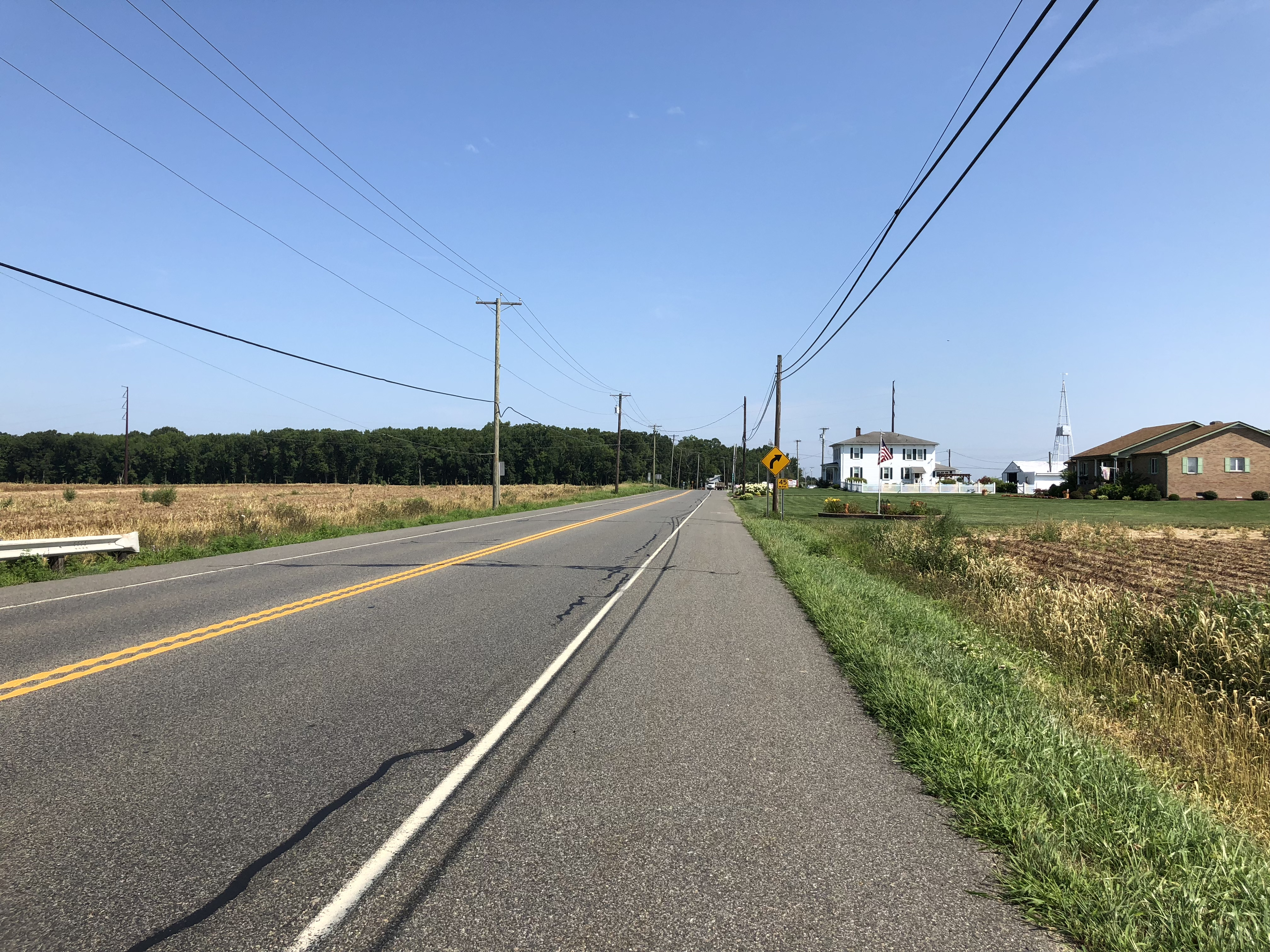
Route 77 (Pole Tavern-Bridgeton Road) northbound in Alloway Township

As of May 2010, the township had a total of 79.86 miles (128.52 km) of roadways, of which 36.66 miles (59.00 km) were maintained by the municipality and 43.20 miles (69.52 km) by Salem County.

New Jersey Route 77 (Pole Tavern-Bridgeton Road) passes through the far eastern corner of the township. County Route 540 and County Route 581 also traverse the township.

== Notable people ==
Notable current and former residents of Alloway Township include:

- David Bailey (born 1967), politician who has represented the 3rd legislative district in the New Jersey General Assembly since January 2024
- Irv Halter (born 1954), retired United States Air Force major general who ran for Congress in Colorado in the 2014 elections
- Henry J. F. Miller (1890–1949), general in the United States Army Air Forces during World War II
