= USS Alloway (ID-3139) =

Cargo ship of the United States Navy

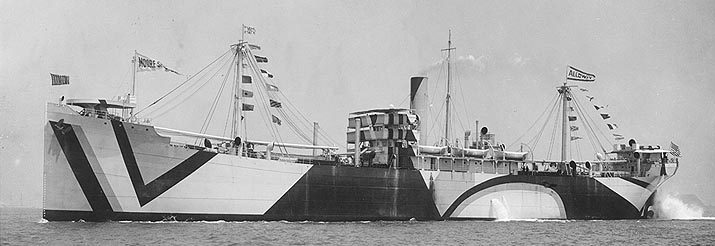
- USS Alloway undergoing builder's trials on 5 July 1918, probably in San Francisco Bay. She is flying the flag of her builder, the Moore Shipbuilding Company of Oakland, California, from a short flagmast on her forecastle. The United States Shipping Board flag is flying from her forward mast, and a flag bearing her name is at the top of her after mast. Note the ship's dazzle camouflage scheme.

History

United States
- Ordered: as Shintaka
- Builder: Moore & Scott, Oakland, California
- Laid down: 1918
- Launched: 14 March 1918
- Acquired: 11 July 1918
- Commissioned: 12 July 1918
- Decommissioned: 3 March 1919
- Stricken: 3 March 1919
- Fate: Transferred to U.S. Shipping Board 3 March 1919; Wrecked 12 February 1929

General characteristics
- Tonnage: 6,113 GRT 4,383 NRT
- Displacement: 12,600 long tons (12,800 t)
- Length: 416 ft 6 in (126.95 m)
- Beam: 53 ft 0 in (16.15 m)
- Draft: 27 ft 6 in (8.38 m) (aft)
- Speed: 12 1/2 knots (23.2 km/h; 14.4 mph)
- Complement: 70
- Armament: 1 × 4 in (102 mm) gun mount, 1 × 3 in (76 mm) gun mount

USS Alloway (Id. No. 3139) was a United States Navy Design 1015 ship cargo ship in commission from 1918 to 1919 that served during World War I and its immediate aftermath. After decommissioning, she served as the commercial cargo ship SS Alloway until she was wrecked in 1929.

== Construction and commissioning ==
SS Shintaka, a screw steamer built in 1918 at Oakland, California, for the United States Shipping Board by Moore & Scott, was acquired by the U.S. Navy on 11 July 1918 for World War I service. Renamed USS Alloway (ID No. 3139), she was commissioned at San Francisco, California, on 12 July 1918.

== Service history ==
=== U.S. Navy ===
Assigned to the Naval Overseas Transportation Service (NOTS), Alloway departed from San Francisco soon after commissioning and set a course for the west coast of South America. She arrived at Arica, Chile, on 17 August 1918 and began loading a cargo of nitrates. She left Arica near the end of August 1918 and arrived at Norfolk, Virginia, on 20 September 1918. She discharged the nitrates at Norfolk and moved on to New York City for repairs.

On 10 November 1918, the day before the armistice with Germany that ended World War I, Alloway departed New York City to begin her only voyage to Europe in U.S. Navy service. A little over a month later, on 11 December 1918, she entered port at Quiberon, France. After unloading over 5,000 tons of United States Army cargo, she continued on to Brest, France. She loaded new cargo there for the return voyage, then crossed the Atlantic and entered New York Harbor on 13 February 1919. After discharging her cargo, she entered Schewan's drydock for overhaul.

On 3 March 1919, Alloway was decommissioned and returned to the U.S. Shipping Board for disposition. Presumably, her name was struck from the Navy list that same day.

=== Commercial service ===
As SS Alloway, the ship entered commercial service, and the U.S. Shipping Board operated her commercially until 1928, when she was sold to the C. P. Box Corporation of Seattle, Washington.

Alloway began her final voyage on 29 January 1929, when she departed Seattle under the command of Captain H. S. Throckmorton carrying a crew of 35 and a cargo of 4,500 tons of lumber bound for Yokohama, Japan, where she was to be scrapped. Her steam engine broke down during the voyage on 10 February 1929, and on 11 February 1929 the American Mail Line steamer Montauk – which was on a voyage to Shanghai, China – took her under tow. The towline broke in Unimak Pass in the Aleutian Islands during a gale on 12 February, and Alloway collided with Montauk – which sustained US$10,000 in damage to her superstructure – immediately after the towline broke, then drifted quickly toward nearby Ugamak Island. Her crew attempted to anchor her, but she dragged the anchor, and all but one member of her crew abandoned ship when it became impossible to stop her from running aground on the coast of Ugamak Island.

One crewman, 20-year-old oiler James L. Posey, remained aboard Alloway after the rest of the crew abandoned ship and even after she ran aground, despite the danger to his life. Montauk radioed that Posey had become mentally deranged because of the stress of five days at sea in the gale and could not be forced to abandon ship, but merchant mariners in Seattle offered the opinion that Posey had remained aboard in order claim a possibly significant share of the salvage value of the US$200,000 ship and her US$80,000 cargo if any salvage attempt took place, and this motive eventually was confirmed. Posey finally abandoned ship on 14 February 1929 and was rescued by a United States Coast Guard cutter shortly before Alloway broke up in the surf. She and her cargo were a total loss.
