= Alloway (CDP), New Jersey =

Populated place in Salem County, New Jersey, US

Alloway, New Jersey
- Census-designated place
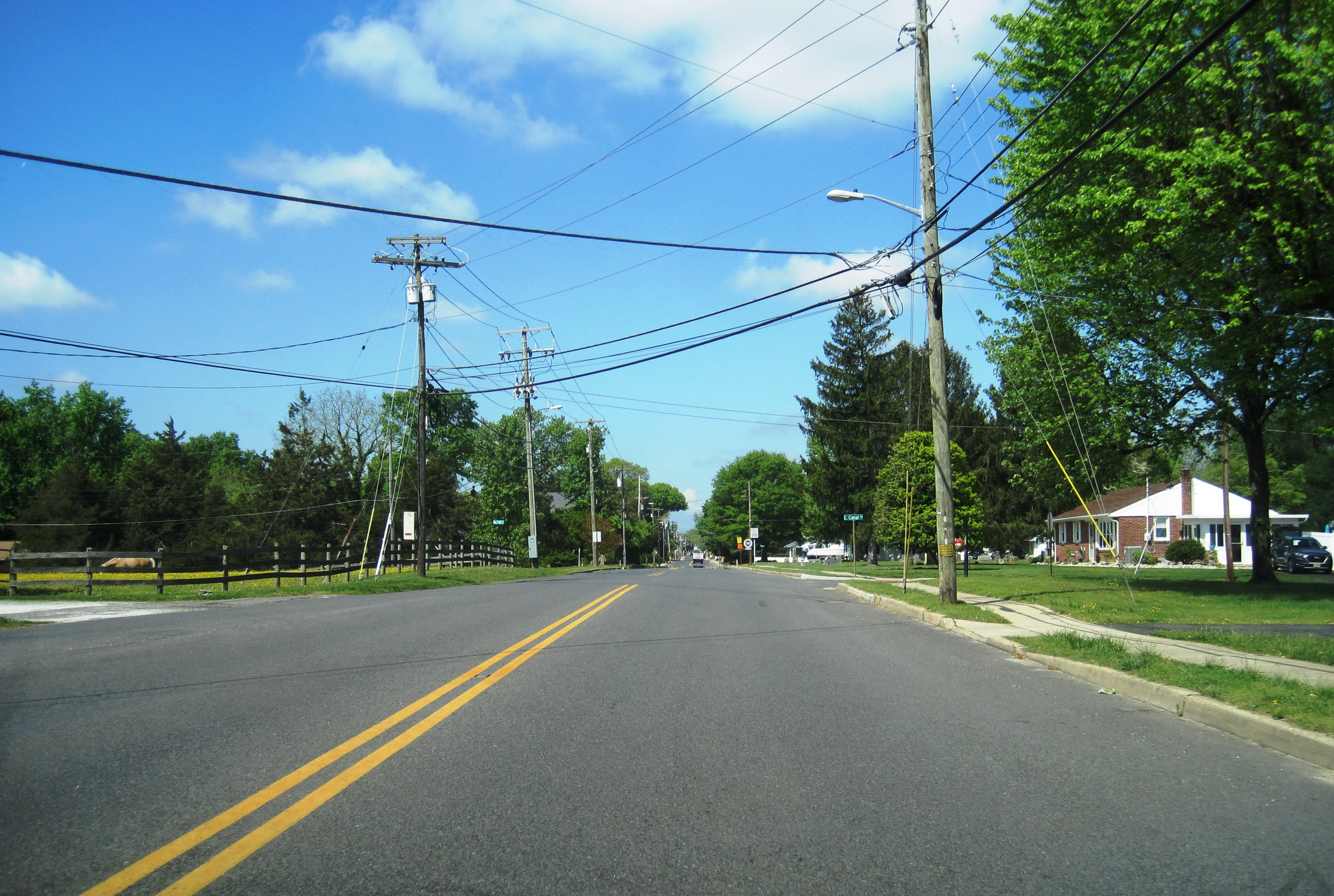
- Main Street (CR 581) at East Canal Street looking west

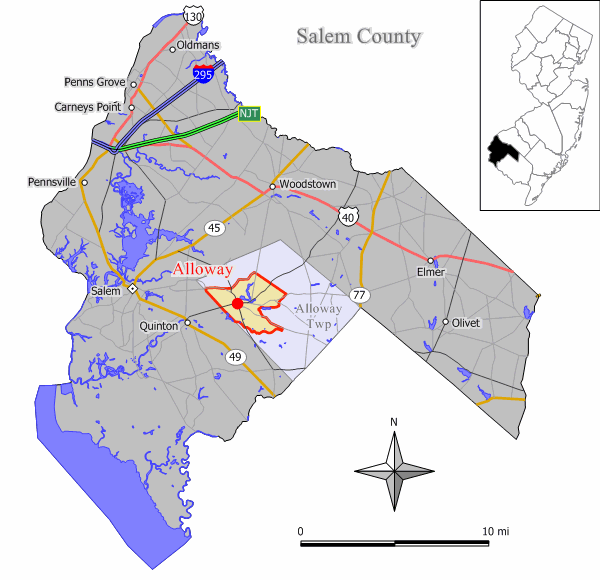
- Map of Alloway CDP in Salem County. Inset: Location of Salem County in New Jersey.

- Location in Salem County Location in New Jersey Location in the United States
- Coordinates: 39.561534°N 75.34928°W
- Country: United States
- State: New Jersey
- County: Salem
- Township: Alloway

Area
  - Total: 7.10 sq mi (18.39 km^{2})
  - Land: 6.85 sq mi (17.74 km^{2})
  - Water: 0.25 sq mi (0.65 km^{2}) 3.56%
- Elevation: 23 ft (7 m)

Population (2020)
  - Total: 1,296
  - Density: 189.2/sq mi (73.05/km^{2})
- Time zone: UTC−05:00 (Eastern (EST))
  - Summer (DST): UTC−04:00 (Eastern (EDT))
- ZIP Code: 08001
- Area code: 856
- FIPS code: 34-00850
- GNIS feature ID: 02389125

Alloway is an unincorporated community and census-designated place (CDP) located within Alloway Township, in Salem County, in the U.S. state of New Jersey. As of the 2010 United States census, the CDP's population was 1,402.

Alloway CDP and Alloway Township are not coextensive, with the CDP covering 21.0% of the 24.588 miles (39.571 km) of the township as a whole.

== Geography ==
Alloway CDP is located at 39°33′42″N 75°20′57″W (39.561534,-75.34928). According to the United States Census Bureau, Alloway had a total area of 7.122 square miles (18.45 km^{2}), including 6.868 square miles (17.79 km^{2}) of land and 0.254 square miles (0.66 km^{2}) of water (3.56%).

== Demographics ==
Historical population
Census	Pop.	Note	%±
1980	1,370		—
1990	1,371		0.1%
2000	1,128		−17.7%
2010	1,402		24.3%
2020	1,296		−7.6%
Population sources: 1950 1960 1970; 1980 1990 2000; 2010

Alloway first appeared as a census designated place in the 1980 U.S. census.

=== 2020 census ===
Alloway CDP, New Jersey – Racial and ethnic composition Note: the US Census treats Hispanic/Latino as an ethnic category. This table excludes Latinos from the racial categories and assigns them to a separate category. Hispanics/Latinos may be of any race.
Race / Ethnicity (NH = Non-Hispanic)	Pop 2000	Pop 2010	Pop 2020	% 2000	% 2010	% 2020
White alone (NH)	1,047	1,311	1,154	92.82%	93.51%	89.04%
Black or African American alone (NH)	47	37	25	4.17%	2.64%	1.93%
Native American or Alaska Native alone (NH)	8	6	10	0.71%	0.43%	0.77%
Asian alone (NH)	1	10	8	0.09%	0.71%	0.62%
Native Hawaiian or Pacific Islander alone (NH)	0	0	5	0.00%	0.00%	0.39%
Other race alone (NH)	0	5	11	0.00%	0.36%	0.85%
Mixed race or Multiracial (NH)	13	19	60	1.15%	1.36%	4.63%
Hispanic or Latino (any race)	12	14	23	1.06%	1.00%	1.77%
Total	1,128	1,402	1,296	100.00%	100.00%	100.00%

=== 2010 census ===
The 2010 United States census counted 1,402 people, 488 households, and 373 families in the CDP. The population density was 204.1 people per square mile (78.8 people/km^{2}). There were 533 housing units at an average density of 77.6 units per square mile (30.0 units/km^{2}). The racial makeup was 94.15% (1,320) White, 2.71% (38) Black or African American, 0.43% (6) Native American, 0.71% (10) Asian, 0.00% (0) Pacific Islander, 0.57% (8) from other races, and 1.43% (20) from two or more races. Hispanic or Latino of any race were 1.00% (14) of the population.

Of the 488 households, 30.5% had children under the age of 18; 63.7% were married couples living together; 7.4% had a female householder with no husband present and 23.6% were non-families. Of all households, 19.9% were made up of individuals and 9.2% had someone living alone who was 65 years of age or older. The average household size was 2.71 and the average family size was 3.12.

25.6% of the population were under the age of 18, 8.3% from 18 to 24, 21.9% from 25 to 44, 31.2% from 45 to 64, and 13.0% who were 65 years of age or older. The median age was 40.6 years. For every 100 females, the population had 102.9 males. For every 100 females ages 18 and older there were 98.3 males.

=== 2000 census ===
As of the 2000 United States census there were 1,128 people, 391 households, and 299 families living in the CDP. The population density was 62.5 people/km^{2} (162 people/mi^{2}). There were 406 housing units at an average density of 22.5 units/km^{2} (58 units/mi^{2}). The racial makeup of the CDP was 93.09% White, 4.34% African American, 0.71% Native American, 0.09% Asian, 0.00% Pacific Islander, 0.35% from other races, and 1.42% from two or more races. 1.06% of the population were Hispanic or Latino of any race.

There were 391 households, out of which 33.0% had children under the age of 18 living with them, 63.4% were married couples living together, 9.0% had a female householder with no husband present, and 23.5% were non-families. 20.5% of all households were made up of individuals, and 10.2% had someone living alone who was 65 years of age or older. The average household size was 2.68 and the average family size was 3.07.

In the CDP the population was spread out, with 28.5% under the age of 18, 6.9% from 18 to 24, 26.2% from 25 to 44, 24.3% from 45 to 64, and 14.1% who were 65 years of age or older. The median age was 38 years. For every 100 females, there were 104.7 males. For every 100 females age 18 and over, there were 99.3 males.

The median income for a household in the CDP was $56,477, and the median income for a family was $66,346. Males had a median income of $40,357 versus $32,083 for females. The per capita income for the town was $25,121. 11.2% of the population and 4.4% of families were below the poverty line. Out of the total people living in poverty, 10.5% are under the age of 18 and 11.8% are 65 or older.
