= Design 1015 ship =

World War I steel-hulled cargo ship design

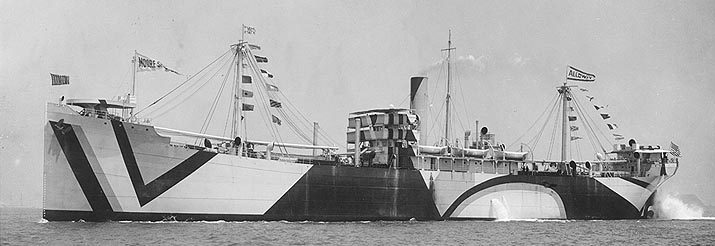
- SS Alloway (1918)

Class overview
- Name: EFT Design 1015
- Built: 1918–21 (USSB)
- Planned: 89
- Completed: 84 (1 delivered incomplete)
- Canceled: 5

General characteristics
- Type: Cargo ship
- Tonnage: 9,400 dwt
- Length: 402 ft 0 in (122.53 m)
- Beam: 53 ft 0 in (16.15 m)
- Draft: 32 ft 0 in (9.75 m)
- Propulsion: Triple expansion engine or turbine, oil fuel

The Design 1015 ship (full name Emergency Fleet Corporation Design 1015) was a steel-hulled cargo ship design approved for production by the United States Shipping Board's Emergency Fleet Corporation (EFT) during World War I. They were referred to as the "Moore & Scott"-type.

They were mostly built at West Coast yards:

- Groton Iron Works, Groton, Connecticut, 6 ships, 3 cancelled, 3 completed
- Moore Shipbuilding and Drydock Company, Oakland, California, 26 ships of which 8 were converted to reefers, no cancellations
- Pacific Coast Shipbuilding Company, Bay Point, California, 10 ships, no cancellations
- Seattle North Pacific Shipbuilding Company, Seattle, Washington, 10 ships, no cancellations
- G. M. Standifer Construction Company, Vancouver, Washington, 15 ships, no cancellations
- Union Construction Company, Oakland, California, 10 ships, no cancellations
- Virginia Shipbuilding Company, Alexandria, Virginia, 12 ships, 2 cancelled, 9 completed, 1 partially completed

== Bibliography ==
- McKellar, Norman L. "Steel Shipbuilding under the U. S. Shipping Board, 1917-1921, Part I, Contract Steel Ships" (PDF). Steel Shipbuilding under the U. S. Shipping Board, 1917-1921. ShipScribe.
