= Crab Orchard, Tennessee =

- City
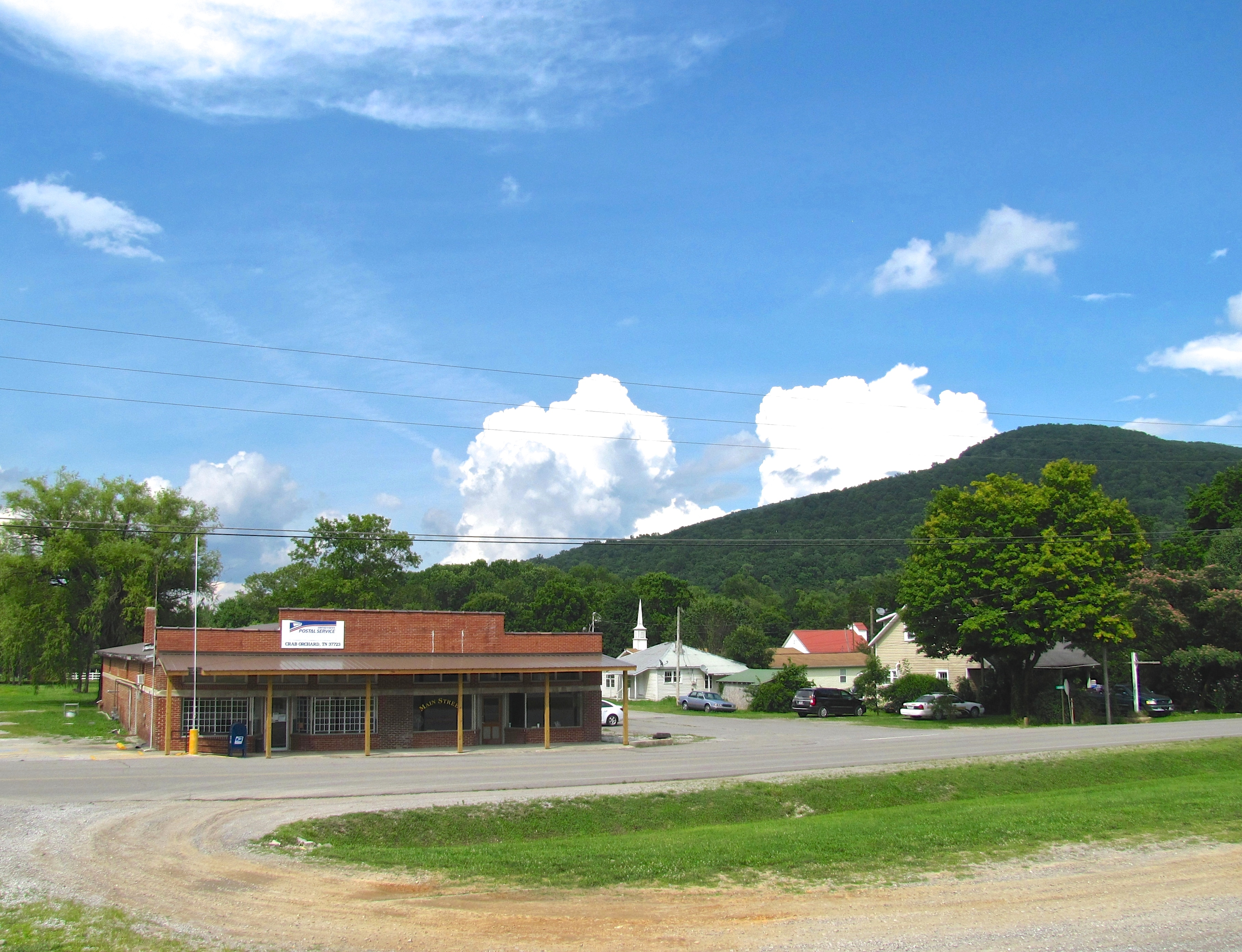
- Main Street in Crab Orchard
- Nickname: Stone Capital of Tennessee
- Location of Crab Orchard in Cumberland County, Tennessee.
- Coordinates: 35°54′21″N 84°52′38″W
- Country: United States
- State: Tennessee
- County: Cumberland
- Settled: 1780s
- Incorporated: 1921
- Named for: Crab apple trees

Government
  - Mayor: Emmett Sherrill

Area
  - Total: 10.93 sq mi (28.32 km^{2})
  - Land: 10.93 sq mi (28.32 km^{2})
  - Water: 0 sq mi (0.00 km^{2})
- Elevation: 1,677 ft (511 m)

Population (2020)
  - Total: 720
  - Density: 65.8/sq mi (25.42/km^{2})
- Time zone: UTC-6 (Central (CST))
  - Summer (DST): UTC-5 (CDT)
- ZIP code: 37723
- Area code: 931
- FIPS code: 47-17840
- GNIS feature ID: 1281520
- Website: https://www.craborchardtennessee.com/

Crab Orchard is a city in Cumberland County, Tennessee, United States. The population was 719 at the 2020 census.

== History ==
Crab Orchard's position in a gap in the Crab Orchard Mountains made it a gateway to the Cumberland area as early as the late 18th century. Pioneers passing through the area named it for its abundance of wild crab apple trees. In the 1780s, a road was built through the gap to help provide protection for travelers migrating from East Tennessee to the Nashville area.

The historian J. G. M. Ramsey reported several Cherokee, Creek, and Shawnee attacks at "the Crab-Orchard" during a period of heightened tensions between Native Americans and encroaching Euro-American settlers in the early 1790s. Around 1792, a small band of troops led by Captain Samuel Handley was attacked by a mixed group of Cherokee, Creek, and Shawnee at Crab Orchard, ending in Handley's capture. In April 1794, a group of travelers was ambushed by a band of Creeks, killing early Cumberland County settler Thomas 'Big Foot' Spencer. A few weeks later, a Lieutenant McClelland was attacked and routed by a band of Creeks at Crab Orchard.

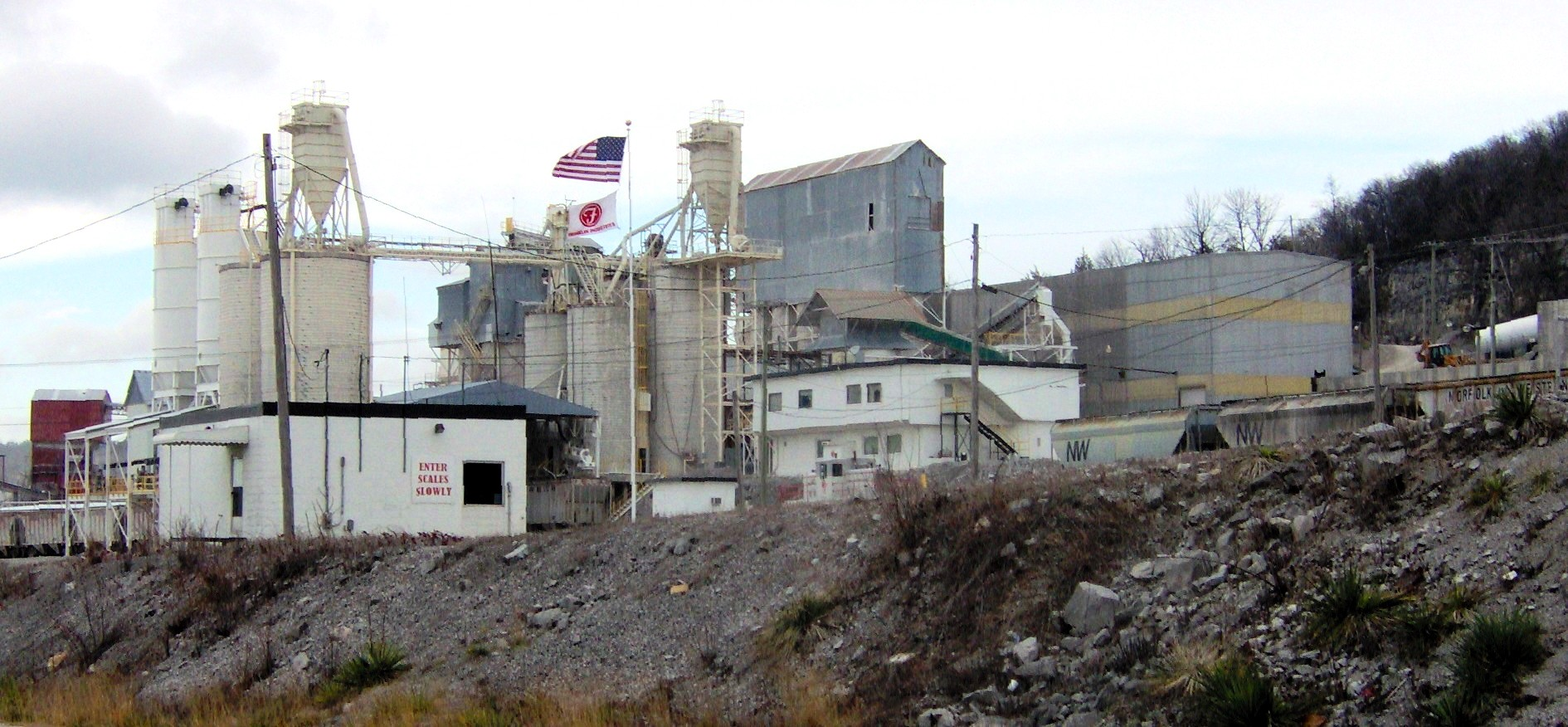
Lhoist North America mine and plant in Crab Orchard

In the late 18th century, as Cherokee attacks subsided, the Walton Road was built as part of the stage road system connecting the Knoxville and Nashville areas. The road passed through Crab Orchard, bringing a steady stream of travelers and migrants to the area. Around 1800, Sidnor's Inn opened at Crab Orchard, with Bishop Francis Asbury being among its earliest guests. In 1827, Robert Burke, whose wife operated a tavern at what is now Ozone established the Crab Orchard Inn, which remained open until the early 20th century.

Crab Orchard received its fame from a rare type of durable sandstone found in its vicinity. First used in local structures and sidewalks in the late 19th century, the Crab Orchard stone gained popularity in the 1920s when it was used in the construction of Scarritt College in Nashville. Numerous buildings in Crossville have been constructed with Crab Orchard stone.

Crab Orchard is home to a large limestone mine operated by Lhoist North America. The mine and its accompanying plant dominate the south side of the Crab Orchard gap along Interstate 40 and US-70.

== Geography ==
Crab Orchard is located at 35°54′21″N 84°52′38″W (35.905965, -84.877239). The town is situated atop the Cumberland Plateau in a gap amidst the Crab Orchard Mountains, a sub-range of the Cumberland Mountains. This gap has long been frequented by travelers between East and Middle Tennessee. Today, both Interstate 40 and U.S. Route 70 pass through Crab Orchard.

Big Rock Mountain (el. 2,703 ft; 824 m) rises prominently to the north of Crab Orchard. Haley Mountain (el. 2,660 ft; 810 m) and Black Mountain (2,827 ft; 2.1 m) dominate the view to the south. A section of the Cumberland Trail will, when completed, traverse Crab Orchard from north to south.

According to the United States Census Bureau, the city has a total area of 11.1 square miles (29 km^{2}), all land.

=== Climate ===
The climate in this area is characterized by hot, humid summers and generally mild to cool winters. According to the Köppen Climate Classification system, Crab Orchard has a humid subtropical climate, abbreviated "Cfa" on climate maps.

== Demographics ==
Historical population
Census	Pop.	Note	%±
1980	1,065		—
1990	876		−17.7%
2000	838		−4.3%
2010	752		−10.3%
2020	720		−4.3%

=== 2020 census ===
As of the 2020 census, there was a population of 720, with 290 households and 189 families residing in the city.

The median age was 42.2 years; 25.3% of residents were under the age of 18 and 18.9% were 65 years of age or older. For every 100 females there were 96.2 males, and for every 100 females age 18 and over there were 97.1 males.

0.0% of residents lived in urban areas, while 100.0% lived in rural areas.

There were 290 households in Crab Orchard, of which 33.1% had children under the age of 18 living in them. Of all households, 41.7% were married-couple households, 21.4% were households with a male householder and no spouse or partner present, and 29.3% were households with a female householder and no spouse or partner present. About 29.3% of all households were made up of individuals and 14.2% had someone living alone who was 65 years of age or older.

There were 325 housing units, of which 10.8% were vacant. The homeowner vacancy rate was 1.7% and the rental vacancy rate was 9.4%.

Racial composition as of the 2020 census
Race	Number	Percent
White	671	93.2%
Black or African American	1	0.1%
American Indian and Alaska Native	1	0.1%
Asian	2	0.3%
Native Hawaiian and Other Pacific Islander	0	0.0%
Some other race	8	1.1%
Two or more races	37	5.1%
Hispanic or Latino (of any race)	21	2.9%

=== 2000 census ===
As of the census of 2000, there was a population of 838, with 345 households and 245 families residing in the city. The population density was 75.5 inhabitants per square mile (29.2/km^{2}). There were 448 housing units at an average density of 40.4 units per square mile (15.6 units/km^{2}). The racial makeup of the city was 99.40% White, 0.12% Native American, and 0.48% from two or more races. Hispanic or Latino of any race were 0.36% of the population.

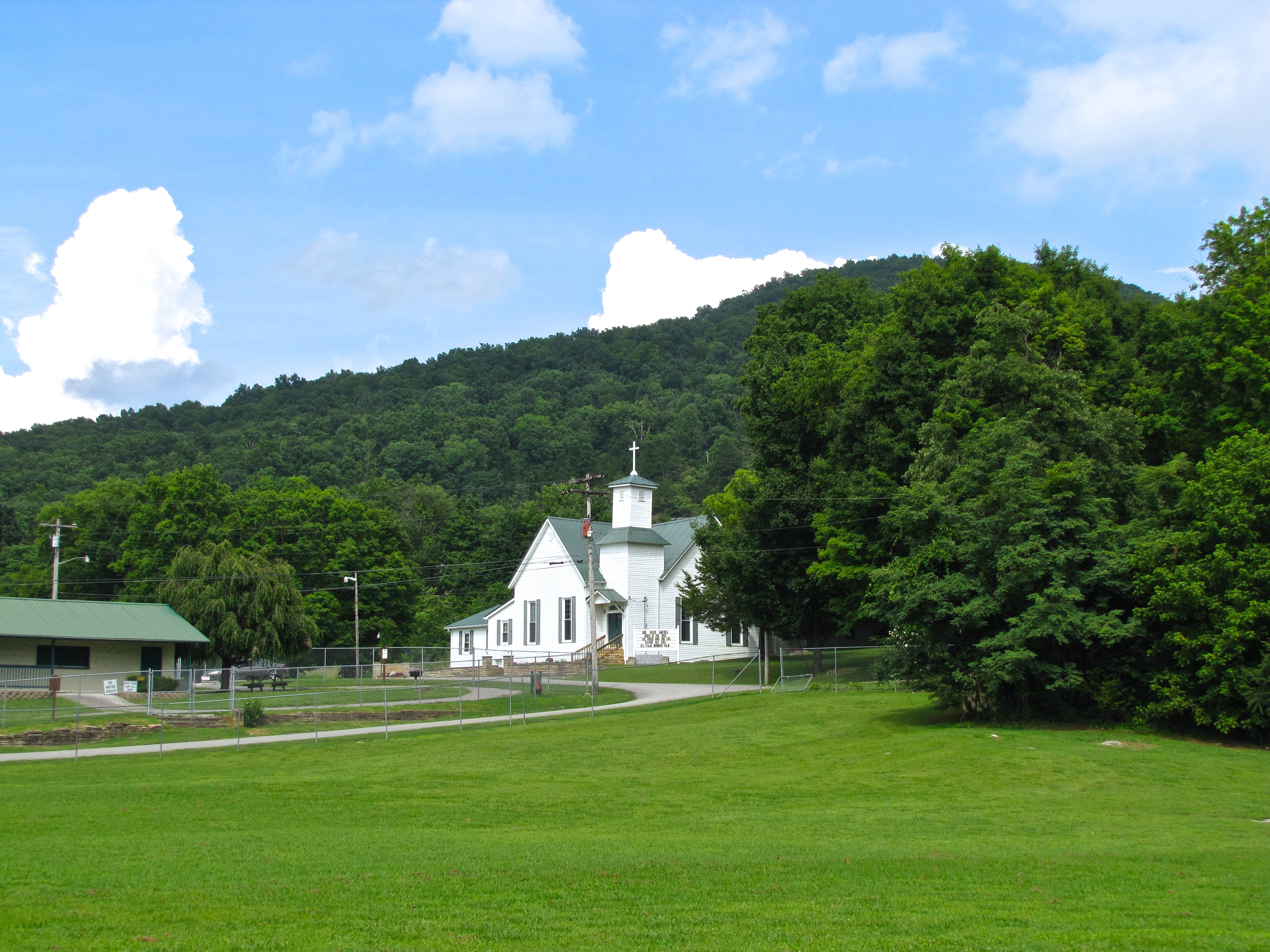
Haley's Grove Baptist Church in Crab Orchard

There were 345 households, out of which 31.0% had children under the age of 18 living with them, 59.4% were married couples living together, 8.1% had a female householder with no husband present, and 28.7% were non-families. 26.4% of all households were made up of individuals, and 9.3% had someone living alone who was 65 years of age or older. The average household size was 2.43 and the average family size was 2.93.

In the city, the population was spread out, with 23.3% under the age of 18, 7.5% from 18 to 24, 31.0% from 25 to 44, 25.1% from 45 to 64, and 13.1% who were 65 years of age or older. The median age was 38 years. For every 100 females, there were 98.1 males. For every 100 females age 18 and over, there were 102.2 males.

The median income for a household in the city was $22,986, and the median income for a family was $29,833. Males had a median income of $24,135 versus $15,809 for females. The per capita income for the city was $11,161. About 12.7% of families and 14.3% of the population were below the poverty line, including 18.1% of those under age 18 and 4.5% of those age 65 or over.
