= Mayland, Tennessee =

- Census-designated place
- Location within Tennessee Location within the United States
- Coordinates: 36°2′53″N 85°11′57″W
- Country: United States
- State: Tennessee
- County: Cumberland

Area
  - Total: 1.62 sq mi (4.19 km^{2})
  - Land: 1.62 sq mi (4.19 km^{2})
  - Water: 0 sq mi (0.00 km^{2})
- Elevation: 1,992 ft (607 m)

Population (2020)
  - Total: 472
  - Density: 291.8/sq mi (112.67/km^{2})
- Time zone: UTC-6 (Central (CST))
  - Summer (DST): UTC-5 (CDT)
- ZIP Codes: 38571 (Crossville); 38574 (Monterey)
- Area code: 931
- FIPS code: 47-46680
- GNIS feature ID: 2586069

Mayland is an unincorporated community and census-designated place (CDP) in Cumberland County, Tennessee, United States. It was first listed as a CDP prior to the 2020 census. It has a population of 472

It is in the northwest part of the county, along U.S. Route 70N, which leads southeast 13 miles (21 km) to Crossville, the county seat, and northwest 9 miles (14 km) to Monterey. The community sits atop the Cumberland Plateau. The southeast part drains to the headwaters of the Caney Fork River, the west part drains via Bridge Creek to the Calfkiller River, a tributary of the Caney Fork, and the north part drains via Meadow Creek to the East Fork of the Obey River. The entire community is part of the Cumberland River watershed.

== Demographics ==
Historical population
| Census | Pop. | Note | %± |
|---|---|---|---|
| 2020 | 472 | | — |
U.S. Decennial Census
