= Ozone, Idaho =

Town in Idaho

Coordinates: 43°24′42″N 111°50′06″W

Ozone is a locale in Bonneville County, Idaho, United States. It is located on Bone Road in eastern Idaho.

In 1946, 26 people were registered to vote in the Ozone precinct.
