= Cumberland County, Tennessee =

County in Tennessee, United States

- County
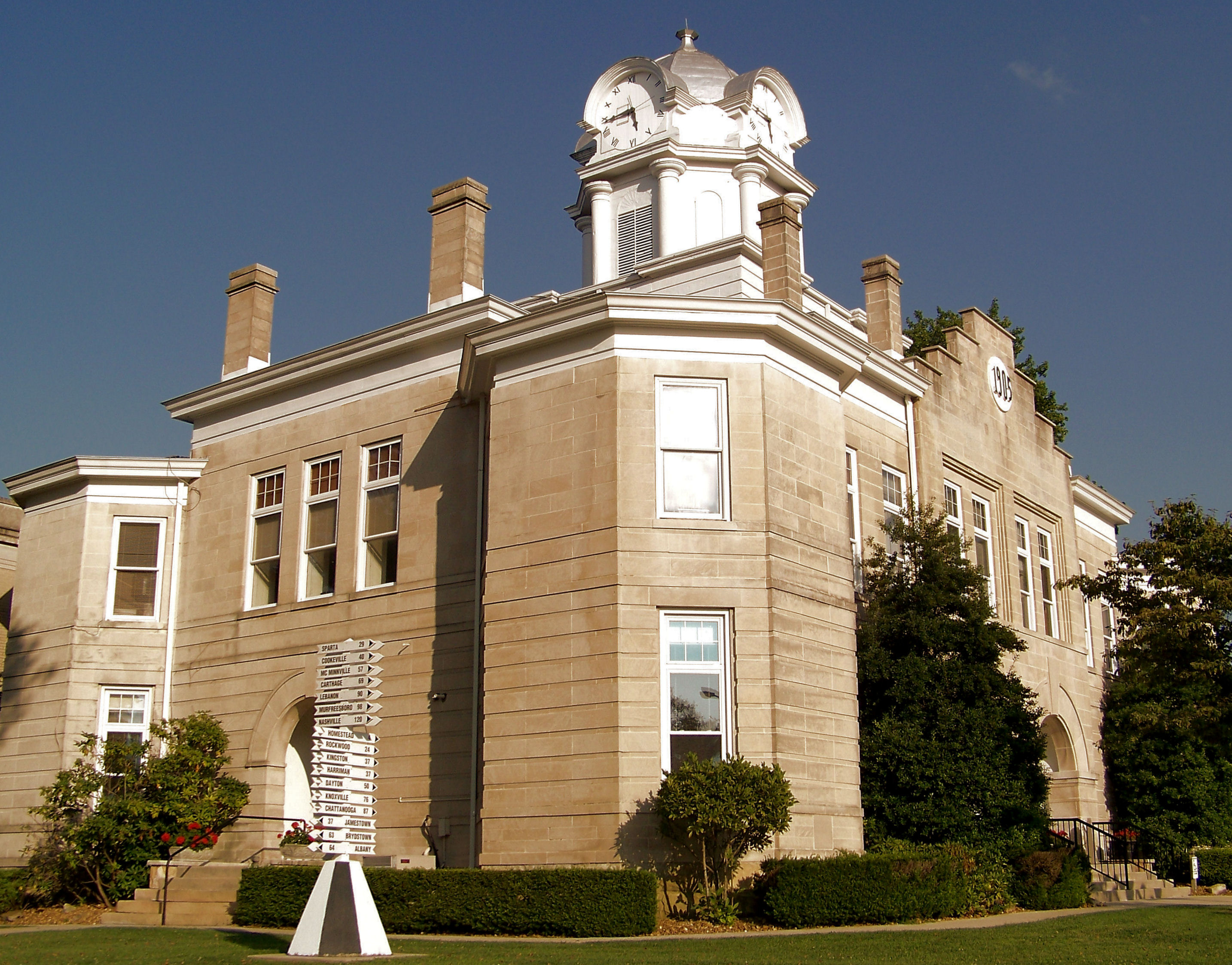
- Cumberland County Courthouse in Crossville

- Flag Seal

- Location within the U.S. state of Tennessee
- Coordinates: 35°57′N 85°00′W
- Country: United States
- State: Tennessee
- Founded: November 16, 1855
- Named for: Cumberland Mountains
- Seat: Crossville
- Largest city: Crossville

Area
  - Total: 685 sq mi (1,770 km^{2})
  - Land: 681 sq mi (1,760 km^{2})
  - Water: 3.8 sq mi (9.8 km^{2}) 0.6%

Population (2020)
  - Total: 61,145
  - Estimate (2025): 66,300 ▲
  - Density: 82/sq mi (32/km^{2})
- Time zone: UTC−6 (Central)
  - Summer (DST): UTC−5 (CDT)
- Congressional district: 6th
- Website: cumberlandcountytn.gov

Cumberland County is a county located in the U.S. state of Tennessee. As of the 2020 census, the population was 61,145. Its county seat is Crossville. Cumberland County comprises the Crossville, TN micropolitan statistical area.

== History ==
Cumberland County was formed in 1856 from parts of Bledsoe, Roane, Morgan, Fentress, Rhea, Putnam, Overton, and White. During the Civil War, the county was nearly evenly split between those supporting the Union and those supporting the Confederacy.

In 1787, the North Carolina legislature ordered widening and improvements to Avery's Trace, the trail that ran from North Carolina through Knoxville and what is now Cumberland County to Nashville. They raised funds by a lottery and completed a project that built a wagon road. This slightly improved travel, but still required a bone jarring trip. The road was often muddy and crossed stone slabs so that it was only passable in some places on foot. Reportedly wagons could not get down the steep grade at Spencer's Mountain without locking brakes on all wheels and dragging a tree behind to slow the descent. The mountain top was described as "quite denuded of trees."

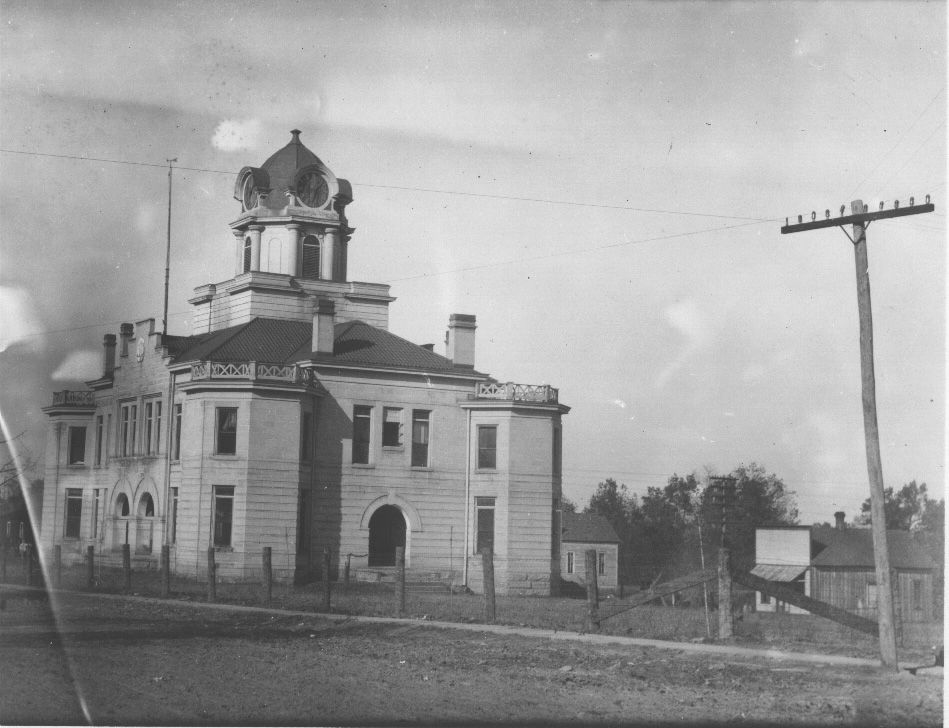
Cumberland County Courthouse, photographed in 1910

Cumberland County was the site of an important saltpeter mine. Saltpeter is the main ingredient of gunpowder and was obtained by leaching the earth from Grassy Cove Saltpeter Cave. Richard Green Waterhouse settled in this area in 1800. In his "Diary, Journal, and Memoirs" he states that he went with William Kelly into Grassy cove and explored his (Kelly's) saltpeter cave on October 7, 1812.

According to Barr (1961), Dicky Mathews began the manufacture of gunpowder at the cave in 1859. His son was killed by an explosion at Powder House Spring below the cave. This is an exceptionally large cave and evidence of mining extends far from the entrance. The leaching vats were located in a large room near the entrance, but this room is damp and the wooden vats have deteriorated to the point that they are difficult to recognize.

During the 1930s, as part of the New Deal, the federal government's Subsistence Homesteads Division established the Cumberland Homesteads outside of Crossville. The program provided land and houses for 250 impoverished families. Cumberland Mountain State Park was built as part of this project.

== Geography ==
According to the U.S. Census Bureau, the county has a total area of 685 square miles (1,770 km^{2}), of which 681 square miles (1,760 km^{2}) is land and 3.8 square miles (9.8 km^{2}) (0.6%) is water. It is the fourth-largest county in Tennessee by area. The county is located atop the Cumberland Plateau. The southernmost of the Cumberland Mountains, known locally as the Crab Orchard Mountains, rise in the northeastern part of the county.

The county is home to a number of karst formations, most notably at Grassy Cove, a large, closed depression located southeast of Crossville. It is 3 miles wide, 5 miles long, and over 1,000 feet deep. All of the water draining into Grassy Cove flows underground through a large cave system and emerges 4 miles southwest at the head of the Sequatchie Valley to form the Sequatchie River.

The Tennessee Divide, where the watersheds of the Cumberland River and the Tennessee River meet, passes through the county. The source of the Caney Fork is located west of the divide, while the source of the Obed River is located east of the divide.

=== Adjacent counties ===
- Fentress County (north)
- Morgan County (northeast/EST Border)
- Roane County (east/EST Border)
- Rhea County (southeast/EST Border)
- Bledsoe County (south)
- Van Buren County (southwest)
- White County (west)
- Putnam County (northwest)

=== National protected area ===
- Obed Wild and Scenic River (part)

=== State protected areas ===
- Bledsoe State Forest (part)
- Catoosa Wildlife Management Area (part)
- Cumberland Mountain State Park
- Cumberland Trail (part)
- Keyes-Harrison Wildlife Management Area
- Luper Mountain Wildlife Management Area
- Mount Roosevelt Wildlife Management Area (part)
- Ozone Falls State Natural Area

== Demographics ==
Historical population
Census	Pop.	Note	%±
1860	3,460		—
1870	3,461		0.0%
1880	4,538		31.1%
1890	5,376		18.5%
1900	8,311		54.6%
1910	9,327		12.2%
1920	10,094		8.2%
1930	11,440		13.3%
1940	15,592		36.3%
1950	18,877		21.1%
1960	19,135		1.4%
1970	20,733		8.4%
1980	28,676		38.3%
1990	34,736		21.1%
2000	46,802		34.7%
2010	56,053		19.8%
2020	61,145		9.1%
2025 (est.)	66,300	▲	8.4%
U.S. Decennial Census; 1790-1960 1900-1990; 1990-2000 2010-2014

=== Racial and ethnic composition ===
Cumberland County, Tennessee – Racial and ethnic composition Note: the US Census treats Hispanic/Latino as an ethnic category. This table excludes Latinos from the racial categories and assigns them to a separate category. Hispanics/Latinos may be of any race.
Race / ethnicity (NH = Non-Hispanic)	Pop 1980	Pop 1990	Pop 2000	Pop 2010	Pop 2020	% 1980	% 1990	% 2000	% 2010	% 2020
White alone (NH)	28,435	34,384	45,603	53,712	56,313	99.16%	98.99%	97.44%	95.82%	92.10%
Black or African American alone (NH)	6	42	58	146	299	0.02%	0.12%	0.12%	0.26%	0.49%
Native American or Alaska Native alone (NH)	22	136	110	145	130	0.08%	0.39%	0.24%	0.26%	0.21%
Asian alone (NH)	26	46	110	237	366	0.09%	0.13%	0.24%	0.42%	0.60%
Native Hawaiian or Pacific Islander alone (NH)	x	x	10	24	12	x	x	0.02%	0.04%	0.02%
Other race alone (NH)	18	4	9	21	102	0.06%	0.01%	0.02%	0.04%	0.17%
Mixed race or Multiracial (NH)	x	x	324	461	1,987	x	x	0.69%	0.82%	3.25%
Hispanic or Latino (any race)	169	124	578	1,307	1,936	0.59%	0.36%	1.23%	2.33%	3.17%
Total	28,676	34,736	46,802	56,053	61,145	100.00%	100.00%	100.00%	100.00%	100.00%

=== 2020 census ===
As of the 2020 census, there were 61,145 people, 25,801 households, and 17,692 families residing in the county. The median age was 53.6 years, 17.3% of residents were under the age of 18, and 32.9% were 65 years of age or older. For every 100 females there were 94.7 males, and for every 100 females age 18 and over there were 92.5 males.

The racial makeup of the county was 93.0% White, 0.5% Black or African American, 0.3% American Indian and Alaska Native, 0.6% Asian, <0.1% Native Hawaiian and Pacific Islander, 1.3% from some other race, and 4.3% from two or more races. Hispanic or Latino residents of any race comprised 3.2% of the population.

46.1% of residents lived in urban areas, while 53.9% lived in rural areas.

There were 26,933 households in the county, of which 20.6% had children under the age of 18 living in them. Of all households, 53.5% were married-couple households, 16.2% were households with a male householder and no spouse or partner present, and 24.9% were households with a female householder and no spouse or partner present. About 28.1% of all households were made up of individuals and 15.9% had someone living alone who was 65 years of age or older.

There were 30,479 housing units, of which 11.6% were vacant. Among occupied housing units, 77.6% were owner-occupied and 22.4% were renter-occupied. The homeowner vacancy rate was 1.8% and the rental vacancy rate was 8.8%.

=== 2010 census ===
As of the census of 2010, there were 56,053 people, 23,791 households, and 16,954 families residing in the county. The population density was 82.3 people per square mile (31.8 people/km^{2}).

There were 28,151 housing units at an average density of 41.3 units per square mile (15.9/km^{2}). The racial makeup of the county was 96.08% White, 0.3% Black or African American, 0.3% Native American, 0.4% Asian, 0.1% Pacific Islander, 1.1% from other races, and 1% from two or more races. 2.3% of the population were Hispanic or Latino of any race.

According to the 2014 American Community Survey the largest ancestry groups in Cumberland County were German (15%), American (14.8%), Irish (12.9%), and English (11.8%).

There were 23,791 households, out of which 24.7% had children under the age of 18 living with them, 57.4% were married couples living together, 9.7% had a female householder with no husband present, 4.2% had a male householder with no wife present, and 28.7% were non-families. 24.4% of all households were one-person, and 11.9% had someone living alone who was 65 years of age or older. The average household size was 2.33 and the average family size was 2.72.

The population was distributed by age as follows, with 19.1% under the age of 18, 6.6% from 18 to 24, 20% from 25 to 44, 28.4% from 45 to 64, and 26% who were 65 years of age or older. The median age was 48.3 years. For every 100 females there were 95.5 males. For every 100 females age 18 and over, there were 92.9 males.

=== 2000 census ===
According to the 2000 census, the median income for a household in the county was $30,901, and the median income for a family was $35,928. Males had a median income of $26,559 versus $20,644 for females. The per capita income for the county was $16,808. About 11.10% of families and 14.70% of the population were below the poverty line, including 21.80% of those under age 18 and 9.30% of those age 65 or over.

== Education ==
The Cumberland County School District oversees two high schools, nine elementary schools, and one charter school. Schools include Cumberland County High School and Stone Memorial High School.

== Communities ==
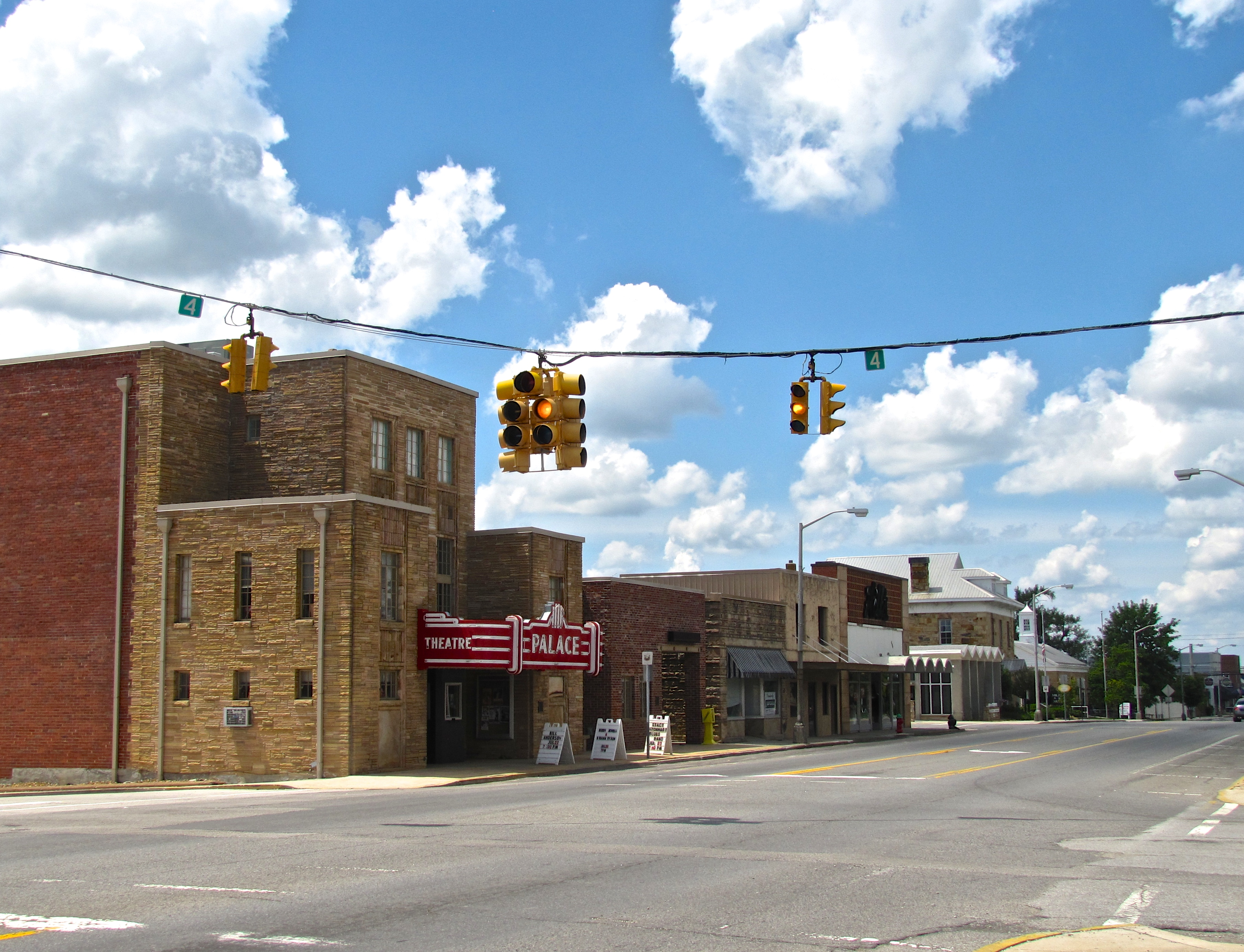
Crossville

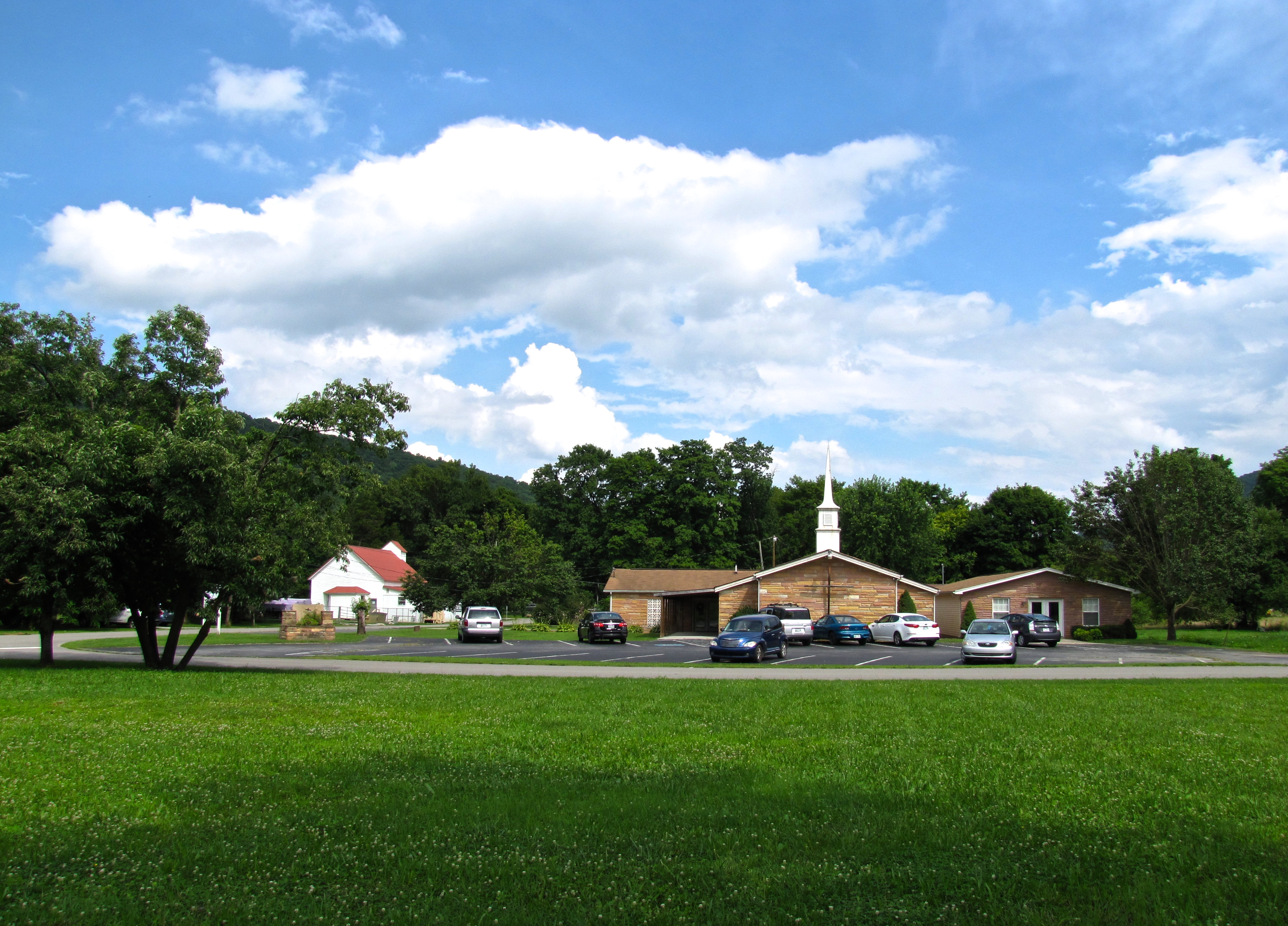
Crab Orchard

=== Cities ===
- Crab Orchard
- Crossville (county seat)

=== Town ===
- Pleasant Hill

=== Census-designated places ===
- Bowman
- Fairfield Glade
- Lake Tansi
- Mayland

=== Unincorporated communities ===
- Alloway
- Bowling
- Cumberland Cove
- Grassy Cove
- Midway
- Ozone
- Renegade Mountain
- Lantana
- Westel, Tennessee

== Politics ==
Like all of East Tennessee, Cumberland County is powerfully Republican, and has generally been favorable to the party since the Civil War. Five Democratic presidential candidates have won the county since then, but none have reached 52 percent of the county's vote. For example, Franklin Roosevelt and Lyndon Johnson only won the county by fewer than 100 votes even as they won over 40 states and 400 electoral votes. The Democrats have only managed 40 percent of the county's vote five other times.

United States presidential election results for Cumberland County, Tennessee
Year	Republican		Democratic		Third party(ies)	
Year	No.	%	No.	%	No.	%
1912	372	28.48%	489	37.44%	445	34.07%
1916	924	68.19%	428	31.59%	3	0.22%
1920	1,485	72.69%	557	27.26%	1	0.05%
1924	885	58.61%	538	35.63%	87	5.76%
1928	1,186	70.14%	505	29.86%	0	0.00%
1932	957	48.73%	996	50.71%	11	0.56%
1936	1,409	49.46%	1,426	50.05%	14	0.49%
1940	1,492	50.32%	1,443	48.67%	30	1.01%
1944	1,786	59.93%	1,174	39.40%	20	0.67%
1948	1,988	53.43%	1,607	43.19%	126	3.39%
1952	3,282	61.45%	2,059	38.55%	0	0.00%
1956	3,200	62.00%	1,925	37.30%	36	0.70%
1960	3,523	60.70%	2,189	37.72%	92	1.59%
1964	2,975	49.19%	3,073	50.81%	0	0.00%
1968	3,115	51.81%	1,428	23.75%	1,469	24.43%
1972	4,593	73.78%	1,482	23.81%	150	2.41%
1976	4,119	47.00%	4,543	51.84%	101	1.15%
1980	6,354	60.89%	3,775	36.17%	307	2.94%
1984	7,083	65.85%	3,605	33.52%	68	0.63%
1988	7,557	65.18%	3,964	34.19%	73	0.63%
1992	7,116	45.06%	6,393	40.48%	2,283	14.46%
1996	8,096	49.53%	6,676	40.84%	1,575	9.63%
2000	10,994	57.81%	7,644	40.20%	379	1.99%
2004	15,144	64.07%	8,327	35.23%	166	0.70%
2008	17,436	67.81%	7,889	30.68%	387	1.51%
2012	18,653	73.73%	6,261	24.75%	384	1.52%
2016	20,413	77.44%	5,202	19.73%	745	2.83%
2020	25,168	77.97%	6,728	20.84%	383	1.19%
2024	27,399	79.09%	6,996	20.20%	247	0.71%

== See also ==
- National Register of Historic Places listings in Cumberland County, Tennessee
