= Tracy Packiam Alloway =

American psychologist and academic

- Education: University of Edinburgh
- Awards: Joseph Lister Award, British Science Association University of Florida Outstanding Faculty Scholarship Award (2019) University of North Florida Outstanding Undergraduate Teaching Award (2015)
- Scientific career
- Fields: Child psychology Cognitive psychology Educational psychology
- Workplaces: University of Stirling; University of North Florida

Tracy Packiam Alloway is a psychologist known for her research on working memory. She is a professor of psychology at the University of North Florida, where she was also the director of the graduate program in psychology. She is the developer of the world's first working memory test designed for use by educators. She authored children's books highlighting the superpowers of children with learning disabilities. Previously, she was the director of the Center for Memory and Learning in the Lifespan at the University of Stirling in the United Kingdom.

Her recent book, Think Like a Girl, explores the way the brain works under stress, in decision-making, in leadership, mental health, and more. She was a guest on the Doctors Talk Show
