= Alloway, Tennessee =

Unincorporated community in Tennessee, US

Coordinates: 35°48′00″N 84°52′32″W

Alloway is an unincorporated community in Cumberland County, Tennessee, in the United States.

The community was likely named for Archelus Alloway, an early settler.
