= Ozone, Tennessee =

- Unincorporated community
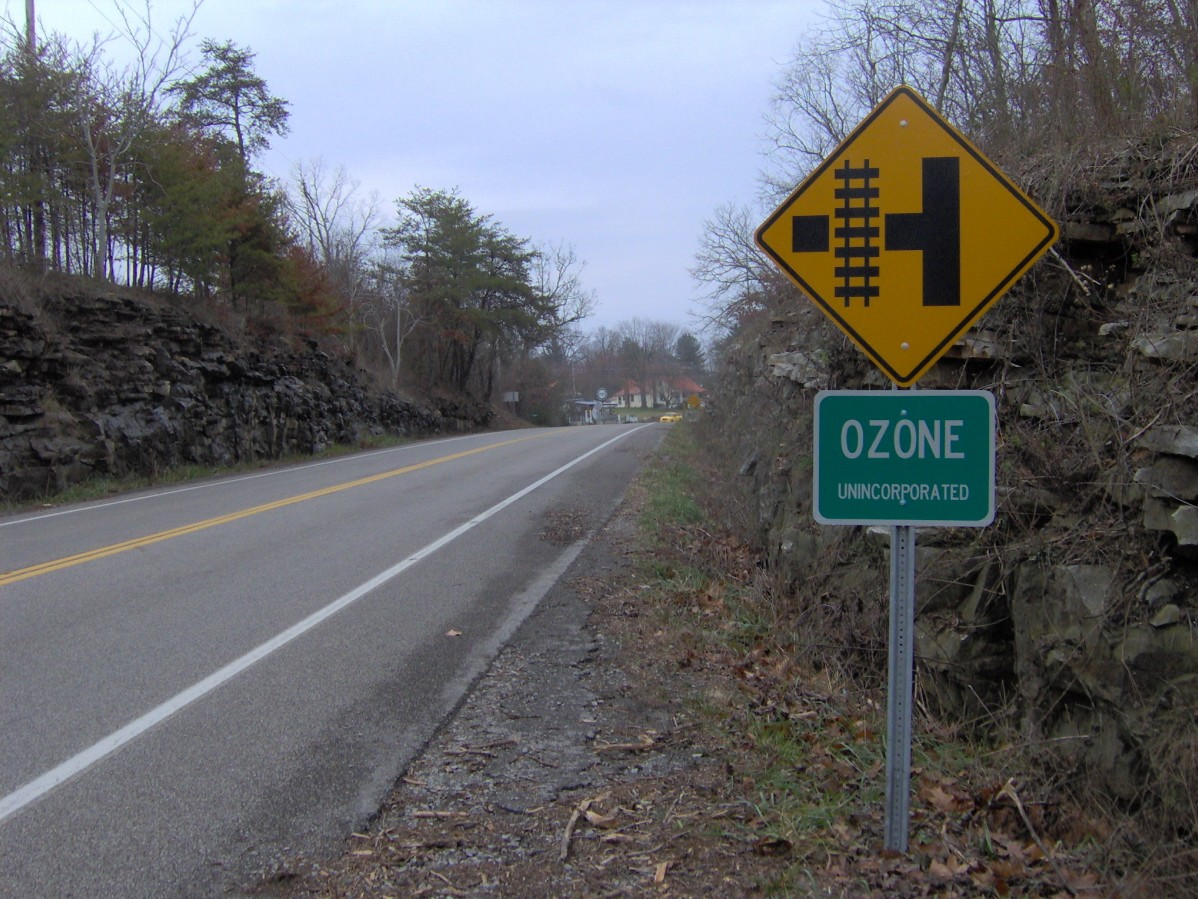
- US-70 entering Ozone

- Location within the state of Tennessee Ozone (the United States)
- Coordinates: 35°52′55″N 84°48′33″W
- Country: United States
- State: Tennessee
- County: Cumberland
- Elevation: 1,631 ft (497 m)
- Time zone: UTC-6 (Central (CST))
  - Summer (DST): UTC-5 (CDT)
- ZIP codes: 37854
- GNIS feature ID: 1296628

Ozone is an unincorporated community in Cumberland County, Tennessee, United States.

Ozone is the location of Ozone Falls State Natural Area, which was established in 1973 to protect Ozone Falls, a 110-foot (33 m) plunge waterfall, and its surrounding gorge.

== Geography ==
Ozone is located at 35°52′55″N 84°48′33″W (35.88194, -84.80917). The community is situated atop the Cumberland Plateau, roughly five miles west of the plateau's eastern escarpment at Walden Ridge and five miles east of the Crab Orchard Mountains. Fall Creek passes through the western part of Ozone before spilling over Ozone Falls and cutting a gorge that forms the community's southern boundary.

Both Interstate 40 and U.S. Route 70 traverse Ozone, connecting the area with Knoxville to the east and Nashville to the west.

== History ==
What is now Ozone was once situated along the stage route built in the late 18th century between Knoxville and Nashville. Around 1806, the widow of Elijah Haley, an early Cumberland settler, established a tavern in the Ozone area, and would later be instrumental in the establishment of Crab Orchard Inn a few miles to the west. A small community grew up in the tavern's vicinity, although it consisted of only a few families. In 1880, when a post office was established, the community adopted the name "Mammy" after a nearby creek. In 1896, the community of Mammy changed its name to "Ozone," which referred to the area's excellent air quality.

Ozone is where Myles Horton began his practice as a popular educator in 1927, helping poor people in Ozone talk out their problems and find solutions together. This deeply informed his organizing practice and helped lead to his founding the Highlander School.
