= Rivers of America Series =

Book series published from 1937 to 1974

The Rivers of America Series is a landmark series of books on American rivers, for the most part written by literary figures rather than historians. The series spanned three publishers and thirty-seven years.

== History ==
The Rivers of America Series started in 1937 with the publication of Kennebec: Cradle of Americans by Robert P. Tristram Coffin, and ended in 1974 with the publication of The American: River of El Dorado by Margaret Sanborn.

Constance Lindsay Skinner initially conceived the series. She was also the first series editor. Skinner wrote an essay that was included in early volumes of the series in which she describes it as follows:

"This is to be a literary and not a historical series. The authors of these books will be novelists and poets. On them, now in America, as in all lands and times, rests the real responsibility of interpretation. If the average American is less informed about his country than any other national, knows and cares less about its past and about its present in all sections but the one where he resides, it is because books prepared for his instruction were not written by artists."

Skinner's unique vision extended to twenty-four volumes, but the series proved so popular that sixty-five volumes were eventually published over a 37-year period.

The publisher, Farrar & Rinehart, shepherded the project through four editors, and the publisher's evolution to Rinehart & Company and later Holt, Rinehart and Winston. The editors of the series were Constance Lindsay Skinner, who died at her desk editing the sixth volume in the series, Carl Carmer, who wrote the sixth volume in the series, Stephen Vincent Benét, and Hervey Allen. Associate editors were Elizabeth L. Gilman and Jean Crawford. The art editors were Ruth E. Anderson, Faith Ball, Benjamin Feder, Philip Fiorello and Lawrence S. Kamp.

The sixty-five books included in the series represent a wide cross section of writers and illustrators. The series' editors sought out poets, novelists, historians, and illustrators to produce a product that would be a literary sketch rather than a historical tome. For the most part, the editors were successful in bringing the folk life of America alive through the lens of the flowing of America's rivers.

The series includes the first book illustrated by Andrew Wyeth, The Brandywine; Marjory Stoneman Douglas' The Everglades: River of Grass which successfully focused public attention on the plight of the Everglades; Paul Horgan's Great River: The Rio Grande in America History, considered the definitive study of the early Southwest; and poet Edgar Lee Masters' The Sangamon.

The series represents one of the finest long-term efforts by a publisher to blend the talents of both writers and artists to present a tribute to the rivers that played such a vital role in the development of America. A testament to the editors' outstanding work is the fact that many of these volumes continue to be reprinted and the original editions are now considered highly collectible.

On April 9 and 10, 1997, a group of Rivers of America authors and illustrators were brought together by the Library of Congress to celebrate the 60th anniversary of the series. The Library of Congress published an Information Bulletin highlighting the celebration on June 7, 1997.

== Editions ==
The first edition, first printings of the series were denoted by a colophon on the copyright page until 1960. The colophon consisted of either FR (1937–1946) or R (1946–1959) in a circle or diamond. After 1960, "First Edition" was printed on the copyright page.

Special signed and numbered limited editions were also produced, though not for every volume in the series, and sometimes in very limited print runs. The signed and numbered editions of the series generally included only the author's signature, though sometimes the illustrator's signature was included as well. Where known, these limited editions are included in the list below.

A set of War Editions was published between 1942 and 1945. These editions used a lesser quality of paper and a smaller font size to meet wartime restrictions.

There were also a series of Armed Services editions, denoted: "Overseas edition for the Armed Forces. Distributed by the Special Services Division, A.S.F., for the Army, and by the Bureau of Naval Personnel for the Navy. U.S. Government property. Not for sale. Published by Editions for the Armed Services, Inc., a non-profit organization established by the Council on Books in Wartime" (Note: This example is from the cover of the St Lawrence)

Several books in the series were revised and/or expanded either in the work itself, or in the illustrations. Where known, these revised editions are included in the list below.

== Books in the series ==
=== Published by Farrar & Rinehart (1937–1946) ===
1. The Kennebec: Cradle of the Americans, Robert P. Tristram Coffin, 1937; illustrated by Maitland de Gogorza

2. The Upper Mississippi, Walter Havighurst, 1937 (revised 1944); illustrated by David Granahan and Lolita Granahan

3. The Suwannee: Strange Green Land, Cecile Hulse Matschat, 1938; illustrated by Alexander Key

4. The Powder: Let 'er Buck, Maxwell Struthers Burt, 1938; illustrated by Ross Santee

5. The James, Blair Niles, 1939; illustrated by Edward Shenton

6. The Hudson, Carl Carmer, 1939; illustrated by Stow Wengenroth

7. The Sacramento: River of Gold, Julian Dana, 1939; illustrated by J. O'Hara Cosgrave, II

8. The Wabash, William E. Wilson, 1940; illustrated by John de Martelly

- The Wabash, William E. Wilson, 1940; illustrated by John de Martelly (signed, limited)

9. The Arkansas, Clyde Brion Davis, 1940; illustrated by Donald McKay

10. The Delaware, Harry Emerson Wildes, 1940; illustrated by Irwin D. Hoffman

11. The Illinois, James Gray, 1940; illustrated by Aaron Bohrod

12. The Kaw: Heart of a Nation, Floyd Benjamin Streeter, 1941; illustrated by Isabel Bate and Harold Black

13. The Brandywine, Henry Seidel Canby, 1941; illustrated by Andrew Wyeth

- The Brandywine, Henry Seidel Canby, 1941; illustrated by Andrew Wyeth (Delaware Edition: signed, limited)

14. The Charles, Arthur Benson Tourtellot, 1941; illustrated by Ernest J. Donnelly

- The Charles, Arthur Benson Tourtellot, 1941; (Boston Edition: signed, limited)

15. The Kentucky, Thomas D. Clark, 1941; illustrated by John A. Spelman, III

16. The Sangamon, Edgar Lee Masters, 1942; illustrated by Lynd Ward

17. The Allegheny, Frederick Way, Jr., 1942; illustrated by Henry Pitz

- The Allegheny, Frederick Way, Jr., 1942; (Pittsburgh Edition: signed, limited)

18. The Wisconsin, August Derleth, 1942; illustrated by John Steuart Curry

19. The Lower Mississippi, Hodding Carter, 1942; illustrated by John McCrady

20. The St. Lawrence, Henry Beston, 1942; illustrated by A.Y. Jackson

21. The Chicago, Harry Hansen, 1942; illustrated by Harry Timmins

---. Songs of the Rivers of America, Carl Carmer, 1942 (not given a series number)

22. The Twin Rivers: Raritan & Passaic, Harry Emerson Wildes, 1943

23. The Humboldt, Dale L. Morgan, 1943; illustrated by Arnold Blanch

24. The St. Johns, Branch Cabell, 1943; illustrated by Doris Lee

25. Rivers of the Eastern Shore: Seventeen Maryland Rivers, Hulbert Footner, 1944; illustrated by Aaron Sopher

26. The Missouri, Stanley Vestal, 1945; illustrated by Getlar Smith

27. The Salinas, Anne B. Fisher, 1945

28. The Shenandoah, Julia Davis, 1945; illustrated by Frederic Taubes

---. The James: from Iron Gate to Sea, Blair Niles, 1945; (Expansion of the 1939 edition, which focused on the Tidewater area of the James River basin only.)

=== Published by Rinehart & Co. (1946–1960) ===
29. The Housatonic: Puritan River, Chard Powers Smith, 1946

30. The Colorado, Frank Waters, 1946

31. The Tennessee: The Old River, Donald Davidson, 1946; illustrated by Theresa Sherrer Davidson

32. The Connecticut, Walter Hard, 1946

33. The Everglades: River of Grass, Marjory Stoneman Douglas, 1947

- The Everglades: River of Grass, Marjory Stoneman Douglas, 1947. (Florida Edition; signed, limited)

34. The Tennessee: The New River, Donald Davidson, 1948; illustrated by Theresa Sherrer Davidson

35. The Chagres: River of Westward Passage, John Easter Minter, 1948

36. The Mohawk, Codman Hislop, 1948; illustrated by Letterio Calapai

37. The MacKenzie, Leslie Roberts, 1949

38. The Winooski: Heartway of Vermont, Ralph Nading Hill, 1949; illustrated by George Daly

39. The Ohio, R. E. Banta, 1949; illustrated by Edward Shenton

- The Ohio, R. E. Banta, 1949; (Valley Edition; signed, limited)

40. The Potomac, Frederick Gutheim, 1949; illustrated by Mitchel Jamieson

41. The Saskatchewan, Marjorie Wilkins Campbell, 1950

42. The Fraser, Bruce Hutchison, 1950

43. The Savannah, Thomas L. Stokes, 1951; illustrated by Lamar Dodd

44. The Gila, Edwin Corle, 1951

45. Salt Rivers of the Massachusetts Shore, Henry Howe, 1951

46. The Monongahela, Richard Bissell, 1952

47. The Yazoo, Frank E. Smith, 1954

48. Great River: the Rio Grande, Paul Horgan, 1954

49. The Susquehanna, Carl Carmer, 1955

50. The French Broad, Wilma Dykeman, 1955; illustrated by Douglas Gorsline

51. The Columbia, Stewart H. Holbrook, 1956

- The Columbia, Stewart H. Holbrook, 1956; (Lewis & Clark Edition: limited, signed)

52. River of the Carolinas: The Santee, Henry Savage, Jr., 1956; illustrated by Lamar Dodd

53. The Merrimack, Raymond P. Holden, 1958; illustrated by Aaron Kessler

=== Published by Holt, Rinehart & Winston (1960–1974) ===
54. The Minnesota, Evan Jones, 1962

55. The Genesee, Henry W. Clune, 1963

56. The Cape Fear, Malcolm H. Ross, 1965

57. The St. Croix, James Taylor Dunn, 1965; illustrated by Gerald Hazzard

58. The Cuyahoga, William Donohue Ellis, 1966; illustrated by Kinley T. Shogren

59. The Yukon, Richard Matthews, 1968; illustrated by Bryan Forsyth

60. The Allagash, Lew Dietz, 1968

61. The Niagara, Donald Braider, 1972; illustrations credited to Buffalo History Museum and the New York Power Authority

62. The Cumberland, James McCague, 1973; illustrated by Charles Walker

63. The Hillsborough: River of the Golden Ibis, Gloria Jahoda, 1973; illustrated by Ben F. Stahl, Jr.

64. The American: River of El Dorado, Margaret Sanborn, 1974; illustrated by Jerry Helmrich

=== Published by William Hodge & Company; London, UK ===
---. The St. Lawrence, Henry Beston, 1951; illustrated by A. Y. Jackson

== See also ==
- Rafael Palacios (artist), provided maps for the last 13 volumes
- List of rivers of the United States
- Rivers of America -- A Southern Illinois University Edwardsville digital exhibition that explores the history and impact of the series and showcases some of the authors and illustrators.
- Fitzgerald, Carol. The Rivers of America: A Descriptive Bibliography, 2001.
- The Rivers of America: A Selected Exhibition of Books from the Collection of Carol Fitzgerald, Bienes Center For the Literary Arts, Broward County Library, 100 S Andrews Avenue, Ft. Lauderdale, Florida 33301 (pamphlet) 1997.
- An America Rivers Saga by Nicholas Basbanes
- Library of Congress Information Bulletin: June 9, 1997 Four-Year 'Rivers of America' Project Announced (June 9, 1997) - Library of Congress Information Bulletin and 'Rivers of America' (June 9, 1997) - Library of Congress Information Bulletin
- Skinner, Constance Lindsay. The Rivers of America: An Essay
