= Barber Badger =

American editor and publisher

- Born: June 24, 1793; Coventry, Connecticut, U.S.
- Died: Unknown; New York City, New York, U.S.
- Occupations: Publisher; Editor

Barber Badger was an American editor and publisher.

== Early life ==
Barber Badger was born in Coventry, Connecticut on June 24, 1793.

== Career ==
Badger worked as a printer before becoming an editor.

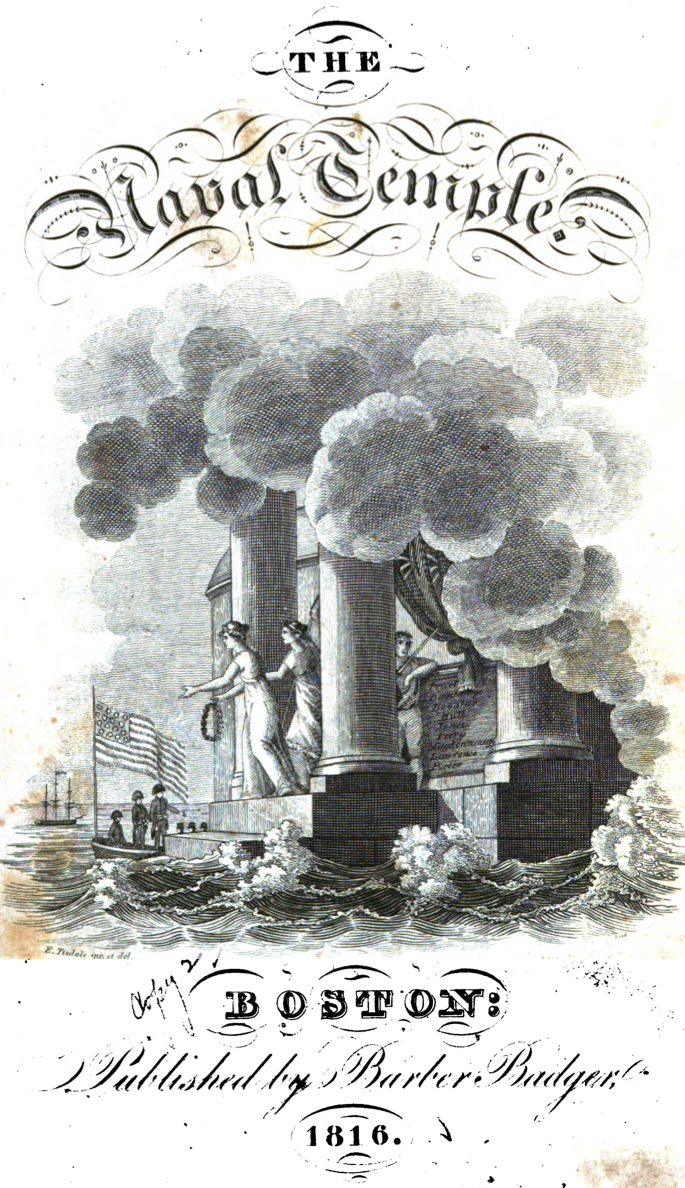
The Naval Temple, Published by Barber Badger, Boston, MA, 1816

Initially released in 1816 under the title The Naval Temple, he published his first book in Boston, Massachusetts. The authorship of "American Naval Battles: Being a Complete History of the Battles Fought by the Navy of the United States, from its Establishment in 1794 to the Present Time" was later attributed to both Horace Kimball and Barber Badger in the 1830s. Covering the period from 1794 to 1816, the book was an extensive historical account of the United States Navy's engagements. It featured engravings by Michele Felice Cornè.

Residing in Boston, he was among the Methodists in New England. On May 26, 1821, he revived The Religious Intelligencer, a quarto-format weekly publication originally launched by James D. Knowles, pastor of Second Baptist Church in Boston. In 1823, it was enlarged to a folio, and was titled The Religious Intelligencer and Evening Gazette until 1824.

In 1823, he took on the role of editor for Zion's Herald, America's first weekly Methodist publication, which was based in Boston. After the paper obtained wide circulation and the publication committee granted him a liberal salary, he devoted himself to editing on a full-time basis.

In 1826, he accepted a job in New York City at the Methodist Episcopal Church's weekly newspaper, The Christian Advocate and worked as its first editor. The first volume was issued on September 9, 1826. He held the position until 1828.

He launched Badger's Weekly Messenger on July 4, 1831. The publication was renamed to the New York Weekly Messenger in 1836, with Badger and William Burnett as the first publishers.
