= Hulbert Footner =

Canadian-born American writer

- Born: April 2, 1879
- Died: November 17, 1944 (aged 65)
- Occupation: Writer (novelist)
- Writing career
- Period: 20th century
- Genres: Fiction, travelogues

Hulbert Footner (April 2, 1879 – November 17, 1944) was a Canadian born American writer of primarily detective fiction. He also wrote some non-fiction.

== Early career ==
He was born William Hulbert Footner in Hamilton, Ontario on April 2, 1879. His mother lived in New York City and was visiting with her parents in Hamilton, Ontario. Frances Christina Mills and Harold John Footner were his parents. Her family were loyalists who fled the United States between 1775 and 1815 and considered themselves British loyalists rather than either citizens of the United States or Canada throughout the 19th Century. His grandfather, William Footner, was born in England and emigrated to Canada, and settled in Montreal and had a career in architecture; one of his surviving structures is Bonsecours Market, built in 1845.

Footner attended grade school in Manhattan and beyond that was self-educated. His complete reading program of classics of literature is laid out in his journal. His first known published item is a poem titled Roundelay For March published in 1902. His first article was published in 1903. Its subject was a canoe trip with a companion on the Hudson River, which began on the Fourth of July from the outskirts of New York City and ended at Montreal, Quebec, Canada.

Footner wrote a four-act play, titled, The Saving of Zavia in 1904 that he later retitled, "The Younger Mrs. Favor," He accepted a part in a play, Sherlock Holmes, which opened in Baltimore, when the lead actor made a commitment to produce his play. His acting role took him to forty-one states and four Canadian provinces. His play was never produced. While traveling he wrote a vaudeville sketch for two characters, his Long-lost Child, which he and a comedian from the closed show performed in, until his partner asked that he replace himself. Two decades later a Baltimore Sun columnist wrote extensively about his early experiences in the theater world. He returned to New York and nearly starved there, living on thirty cents a day, but fully occupied by a long list of classic literary books and plays, which substituted for a formal education.

He accepted a reporter job on the Calgary "Morning Albertan" in 1906, which was the year after Alberta became a province. His job was dangerous in the lawless town. He was saved by an assignment that sent him to Edmonton to report on the first meeting of the new province's legislature. He was appointed historian to a legislative expedition formed to explore the unexplored northern part of the province. His job was canceled when the expedition was abandoned and in his words, "I undertook to make the journey of 3000 miles or so on my own." He travelled by canoe alone to Lesser Slave Lake, then to Peace River Crossing and on to Spirit River and Pouce Coupe Prairie. He paid his expenses by syndicating the story to several Canadian newspapers.

He returned to New York City and took and lost an office job; almost starved again but sold two western adventure stories to Century magazine, after which he departed New York in his canoe for Chesapeake Bay in 1910. He experienced bad weather at Baltimore that forced him to take the steamboat Westmoreland with a ticket to Solomons, Maryland, a stop, according to the boat's purser, that had not been made for seventeen years. He wrote Two on the Trail, his first novel at Solomons, which was published by Doubleday, Page & Co., in 1911. His story is a fictionalized version of his 1906, 3,000-mile canoe trip made through Northern Alberta alone. His story in this romantic and exciting, adventurous novel, retraces his voyage by means of a "scene by scene reproduction of the author’s single-handed experiences" in his canoe; "that are, his visual experiences, not his emotional ones, for he went alone!"

He made a second journey to the Northwest Territory, and this time with a partner, Auville Eager who he trained in canoe handling during a journey to Florida and return. His trip to the far-north, unexplored regions of Canada began in the early summer of 1911. His explorations opened with a series of rickety, railroad rides west through the Rockies, north by wagons into British Columbia to Yellowhead Lake where they launched a ribbed, folding canvas boat and headed north down the Fraser River, and as he admits, "thoroughly scared of the rapids ahead". He and his partner continued on a northerly course to the upper regions of Alberta on the great Hay River that flowed due north to the Great Slave Lake located in the Territory of MacKenzie. His explorations ended at the Alexandra Falls.

He and his partner took its rapids, portaged around the worst and hitched rides around others, and paddled on its swift lakes. As a result, they were able to handle the dangerous rapids of Fraser River, and survived the predictions of everybody passed en route. They continued north to the Crooked River, then on to the Parsnip, the Finlay and their dangerous rapids; east again through a mountain gap, down the mighty rapids of Peace River to Hudson Hope; that was followed by a six hundred mile paddle on Peace River to Fort Vermilion. There was a portage by horses to the Hay River and another paddle of several hundred miles that ended at the Alexandra Falls, a 100-foot wall of water on August 29, 1911.

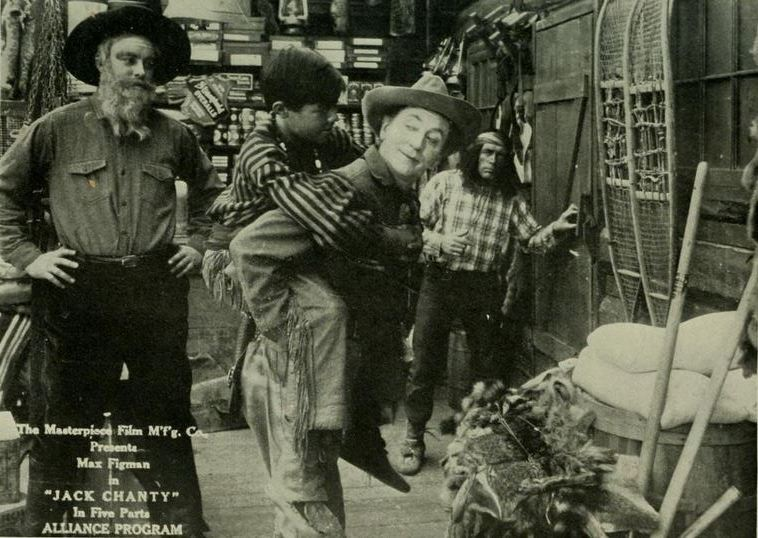
Still from the film Jack Chanty (1915).

He wrote many short stories and novels based on his early adventurous canoe voyages, which were serialized in Cavalier, Western Story Magazine, Argosy, Munsey's and Mystery and then published as novels. His book, New Rivers of the North was utilized by subsequent surveyors and mapmakers to guide them as they moved north into the unmapped North West Territory to Slave Lake. His explorations of upper Canada are recognized by these officials, who were the original surveyors, and used this book as a guide, then gave his name in appreciation to beautiful Lake Footner near the town of High Level and to a large tree preserve in northwestern Alberta, which has the name Footner Forest.

His novel Jack Chanty, which is based on his canoe adventures in the great northwest, and published by Doubleday, Page & Co., where Christopher Morley was a fledgling editor assigned to the similarly inexperienced novelist, and a friendship was created that remained close until Footner's death. His second novel had many editions and reprints in New York, Canada and London, anchoring Footner's lifelong career as a novelist. Grosset & Dunlap reissued the novel Jack Chanty, as a Photoplay edition illustrated with scenes from the film that "was produced by Masterpiece Film Manufacturing Co."

He wrote several other adventure books set in the Canadian northwest after he had relocated to Maryland in 1913: The Sealed Valley, Toronto, 1914; The Fur Bringers, London, 1916; The Huntress, 1917, London; On Swan River, London, 1919 & published in the US as The Woman From Outside, New York, 1921; The Wild Bird, London & New York, 1923; A Backwoods Princess, New York & London, 1926; The Shanty Sled, 1926; Roger Manion’s Girl, London, 1928, and Tortuous Trails, London, 1937, a book of several crime cases set in Canada.

== Career as a dramatist ==
Smitten by New York's Broadway and his initial experiences as an actor, when a big moneyed-producer beckoned, he had a play ready, Shirley Kaye, which was produced at the Hudson Theater, and had a decent run during the season of 1916-17, despite unenthusiastic reviews. It was later made into a film of the same name in 1917 starring Clara Kimball Young. His rewards from Shirley Kaye were used to buy and rebuild an ancient house seven miles upriver from the birthplace of his bride, Gladys March, two life-changing events for the enthusiastic canoeist who caught the eye of many beautiful women. He wrote several more plays; one that starred Margaret Anglin, The Open Fire got close to Broadway, but died on its road tour due to a weak second act. He turned an article into a sketch for vaudeville titled Love in a Lunch Wagon. His play Publicity - A Comedy of Crime was produced by the Vagabond Players as was Who Sups With The Devil, which was later under option to Howard Lindsay for a decade but never produced by him.

== Career as author of detective-adventure stories ==
His travels by canoe ended but were replaced by constant shifts of his growing family to New York, Charleston, New Orleans, London, then to Japan and China alone, and several year-long visits to Britain, France and Italy with the growing family after Europe emerged from its Great War in 1918. He collected book royalties in London through the years as his popularity as a writer of detective-adventure stories seemed secure. He acquired a circle of writer-friends abroad, most of whom visited his home, "Charles' Gift," and included authors Frank Swinnerton and H. M. Tomlinson, James Bone, London editor of the Manchester Guardian, David Bone, writer of sea tales and master of White Star liners, Max Beerbohm, who he met at Rapallo, Aldous Huxley, Frank Morley, an editor at Faber & Faber, and Arthur Wesley Wheen, a World War I mentally scarred British spy, who was a close friend, and lived a tottering existence on the rim of life with the stress of deep guilt, and was translator of Erich Maria Remarque's All Quiet on the Western Front and The Road Back, which was published in 1929.

His friend Christopher Morley was also a writer of books and poetry of a lighter vein. He credits Morley for having steered him past an overdose of northwestern stories into crime stories, adventure and romance. His most successful creation was the beautiful and brilliant Madame Rosika Storey and her assistant Bella Brickley, who explains the evolving solutions to her employer’s cases. His Madame Storey mysteries fit the flapping 1920s and did well supporting his traveling family's lifestyle. These cases appeared in Argosy All-Story Weekly from 1922 through 1935 for a total of 30 stories. Those that were reissued as books were:

1. The Under Dogs, New York, London, 1925,
2. Madame Storey, New York, London, 1926,
3. The Velvet Hand, New York London, 1928, which includes "The Viper"
4. The Doctor Who Held Hands, 1929,
5. Easy to Kill, 1931,
6. The Casual Murderer, London, 1932, Philadelphia, 1937,
7. The Almost Perfect Murder, 1933,
8. Dangerous Cargo, 1934, which was also a film, and;
9. The Kidnapping of Madame Storey, London, Toronto, and New York, 1936.
- The Scrap of Lace: The Complete Cases of Madame Storey, Volume 1, 2019, Steeger Books
- The Viper: The Complete Cases of Madame Storey, Volume 2, 2020, Steeger Books

He also two-finger typed on his Corona typewriter during these productive years the following books of mystery, adventure and romance: The Fugitive Sleuth, 1918, Thieves Wit, 1918, The Substitute Millionaire, 1919, The Owl Taxi, 1921, Country Love, London, 1921, The Deaves Affair, 1922, Ramshackle House, 1922, Officer!, 1924, The Chase of the "Linda Belle," 1925, Cap’n Sue, 1928, Queen of Clubs, 1928, A Self-Made Thief, 1929, Anybody’s Pearls?, 1930, Trial By Water, 1931, Dead Man’s Hat, 1932 and The Ring of Eyes, 1933.

His romantic novel Country Love has a unique history including the fact that it was never published in the United States as a book after it was serialized by Munsey’s Magazine, July to December 1920. It was published in Great Britain by Hodder & Stoughton in 1921. Country Love was adapted by Metro Pictures Corp. and the film renamed Youth to Youth in 1922, which included two actors that were later famous, Zasu Pitts and Noah Beery. Country Love is credited as the original story upon which it is based. His original romantic tale is set on board Adams Floating Theater, which brought plays and vaudeville acts to the isolated villages of Chesapeake Bay including Solomons, Maryland during the decades following World War I. A book reviewer for the Baltimore Sun several decades later notes that two later authors established their careers with subsequent books about this famous floating theater: Edna Ferber, who visited it in 1924 but shifted its location to the Mississippi River when she wrote, Show Boat and in John Barth's first novel's plot, The Floating Opera, was based on the long gone Adams Floating Theater when it was published in 1956.

His earnings fell victim to the Great Depression, which eventually had a grim effect on the family's yearlong stay in Europe, which was made possible by his royalties there and Europe's lower costs. His family of six lived in Kensington in the autumn of 1932 when the stock market was up. Footner had a heart attack during the family's winter of 1933 on the Côte d’Azur and the New York stock market crisis occurred during the summer of 1933 at Venice, and so the winter and summer events clouded his future. His subsequent production of novels, non-fiction books and even a play were prolific although he never again traveled further than New York. His conversational stimulation centered at the Players Club in New York and the West Hamilton Street Club in Baltimore where Henry Mencken and "Woolly" Woollcott led the discourse.

His production of adventure-mystery continued upon the family's return from Europe in September 1933 but book sales fell as the depression deepened: Murder Runs in the Family, New York, London, 1934 Paris, 1938, Scarred Jungle, New York, London, 1935, The Whip-Poor-Will Mystery, New York, London (as The New Made Grave), 1935, Murder of a Bad Man, London, 1935, New York, 1936, The Island of Fear, New York, London, 1936, The Dark Ships, New York, London, 1937, Paris, 1938, Berlin, 1951, The Obeah Murders, New York, London (Murder in the Sun), 1937, and Sinfully Rich, New York, London, 1940.

He introduced a new detective, Amos Lee Mappin, whose crimes tend to occur in New York's cafe society. His Mappin's "Watson" is another young woman, his secretary Fanny Parran, an example of how unusually female-oriented Footner's fiction is. His books in the Mappin series opened with The Mystery of the Folded Paper, New York and London (as The Folded Paper Mystery), 1930, but only for this single novel as he did not abandon Madame Storey for Mappin until the publication of Death of a Celebrity, New York, London, 1938, The Nation’s Missing Guest, New York, London, 1939, The Murder that had Everything, New York, London, 1939, and for the armed services, 1942, Murderer’s Vanity, New York, London, 1940, Who Killed the Husband, New York, London, 1941, The House with the Blue Door, New York, London, 1942, The Death of a Saboteur, London, 1941, New York, 1943, Unneutral Murder, New York, London, 1944 and Orchids to Murder, New York, London, Barcelona, 1945.

Footner through the years strived for kinder and more humanistic story-plots as he had done so successfully with his early romances of the north country and Country Love. Morley praised these later novels, Antennae, New York, 1926, published in London as Rich Man, Poor Man, 1928 and More Than Bread, Philadelphia, London, 1938, the latter when published caused great excitement in the Calvert County where it was set and had the locals guessing who the lovers were in this tight isolated region of Maryland. Morley concluded if he had assumed a pseudonym they would have found a greater audience.

Obituary from the New York Times, 1944:

"Hulbert Footner, Novelist, was 65. Prolific Author of Detective and Adventure Stories--Wrote Broadway Play. Baltimore, Nov. 25 (AP)
Hulbert Footner, novelist, playwright and historian, died unexpectedly tonight at his home of a heart attack. His age was 65. A Canadian by birth, he came to Maryland almost thirty-five years ago. He began writing professionally as a young man and most of his early books were adventure and detective novels. In recent years, however, he turned more and more to writing of Maryland and its countryside. His last book Rivers of the Eastern Shore, was published early this month and he was preparing a somewhat similar work on Tidewater Virginia. One of his plays, Shirley Kaye, was produced on Broadway almost thirty years ago with Elsie Ferguson in the starring role. Mr. Footner had been a prolific writer since 1911 and turned out many novels of adventure and mystery, but found time for other works, such as New York: City of Cities in 1937, praised by critics as amusing and instructive. He also wrote widely about Maryland, his adopted state. In 1916 he married Gladys Marsh. Four children were born of the union. They were Mary Ann, Phoebe, Jane and Geoffrey. Mr. Footner's home was "Charles' Gift," Lusby, Md. For several years he was a member of The Players in New York."

== Non-fiction ==
His only non-fiction book prior to those written late in life was New Rivers of the North - Outing Publishing Company; New York; 1912. Footner summed up a life of writing with a loving and well received testimonial to the city where he grew up, and returned to all his life, titled, New York, Cities of Cities with photographs by John J. Floherty, Philadelphia, 1937. His next nonfiction book is a semi autobiographical homage to the house he restored and of his neighbors in Calvert County, Maryland titled, Charles’ Gift with photographs by Paul Braun, New York, London, 1939. He wrote a well-received biography of Joshua Barney after having become fascinated by an oral history of his battles in nearby St. Leonard's Creek in Calvert County during the War of 1812, as recited by his neighbor, Edward Sollers. He titled it: Sailor of Fortune: The Life and Adventures of Commodore Barney, U.S.N., New York, 1940.

He, having found a footing in nonfiction as his health failed, then wrote Maryland Main and the Eastern Shore, illustrated by Louis Ruyl, New York, 1942, a chapter by chapter study of all of Maryland through his eyes and impressions as an outsider, including one chapter about the "Sage of Baltimore".

Footner died with only a taste of the joy of Rivers of the Eastern Shore, illustrated by Aaron Sopher, Farrar & Rinehart, the Rivers of America Series, New York and Centerville, MD, 1944-2011.

Marylanders agreed through many printings that the considerate, alert, thoughtful, and self-effacing observer from outside, William (Bill) Hulbert Footner, caught the essence of Maryland in this book and the preceding books so exactly right.)

Hulbert Footner died while proofreading Orchids for Murder on November 25, 1944. This last detective story, which was published posthumously, and includes Christopher Morley's homage to "Bill" Footner with whom he had remained a friend since 1911. Footner is buried at Middleham Chapel, Lusby, MD. His friend H. L. Mencken wrote upon his death to his widow: "You were married for thirty years to one of the most charming men who was ever on earth. I needn’t tell you that I will miss him tremendously."

A book about Footner was released in 2021 - Hulbert Footner: Author of Adventure Novels, Detective Novels and Historical Nonfiction: A Bibliographic Account of His Life and Work, by Jerry Mulcahy.

== Bibliography ==
=== Non-fiction ===
- New Rivers of the North (1912)
- Rivers of the Eastern Shore (1944) (Part of the Rivers of America Series)

=== Fiction ===
- Two on the Trail (1911)
- Jack Chanty: A Story of Athabasca (1913)
- The Sealed Valley (1914)
- The Fur Bringers (1917)
- The Fugitive Sleuth (1918)
- Thieves' Wit (1918)
- The Substitute Millionaire (1919)
- The Owl Taxi (1921)
- The Woman From Outside (1921) (Published in the UK as On Swan River)
- Country Love (1921)
- A Self-Made Thief (1921) (serialised in Argosy All-Story Weekly, 25 Jun-30 Jul 1921, published in the UK as The Murderer's Challenge)
- The Huntress (1922)
- The Deaves Affair (1922)
- Ramshackle House (1922) (made into a 1924 silent film Ramshackle House starring Betty Compson)
- The Wild Bird (1923)
- Officer! (1924)
- The Chase of the "Linda Belle" (1925)
- The Shanty Sled (1926)
- Antennae (1926) (published in the UK as Rich Man, Poor Man)
- A Backwoods Princess (1926)
- Cap'n Sue (1928)
- Queen of Clubs (1928)
- Anybody's Pearls (1930)
- Trial By Water (1931)
- Dead Man's Hat (1932)
- The Ring of Eyes (1933)
- Murder Runs in the Family (1934)
- The Whip-Poor-Will Mystery (1935) (published in the UK as The New Made Grave)
- Murder of a Bad Man (1935)
- Scarred Jungle (1935)
- The Island of Fear (1936)
- The Dark Ships (1937)
- Tortuous Trails (1937)
- The Obeah Murders (1937) (published in the UK as Murder in the Sun)
- More Than Bread (1938)
- Sinfully Rich (1940)
- Murderer's Vanity (1940)

=== Madame Storey ===
- The Under Dogs (1925, novel)
- Madame Storey (1926)
- The Velvet Hand (1928)
- The Doctor Who Held Hands (1929, novel)
- Easy to Kill (1931, novel)
- The Casual Murderer (1932)
- The Viper (1933)
- The Almost Perfect Murder (1933)
- Dangerous Cargo (1934, novel)
- The Kidnapping of Madame Storey (1936)
- The Scrap of Lace: The Complete Cases of Madame Storey, Volume 1 (2019)
- The Viper: The Complete Cases of Madame Storey, Volume 2 (2020)

=== Amos Lee Mappin ===
- The Mystery of the Folded Paper (1930) (published in the UK as The Folded Paper Mystery)
- The Death of a Celebrity (1938)
- The Murder That Had Everything (1939)
- The Nation's Missing Guest (1939)
- Who Killed the Husband (1941)
- The House with the Blue Door (1942)
- Death of a Saboteur (1943)
- Unneutral Murder (1944)
- Orchids to Murder (1944)
