= Wildes =

Wildes is a surname. Notable people with the surname include:

- Harry Emerson Wildes (1890-1982), American sociologist, historian, and writer
- Hayley Wildes (born 1996), Australian rules footballer
- Kevin Wildes (born 1954), American university president
- Leon Wildes, American lawyer
- Michael Wildes (born 1964), American lawyer and politician
- Sarah Wildes (1627–1692), American woman wrongly convicted of witchcraft
