= Isabel Bate =

American artist (1909–1995)

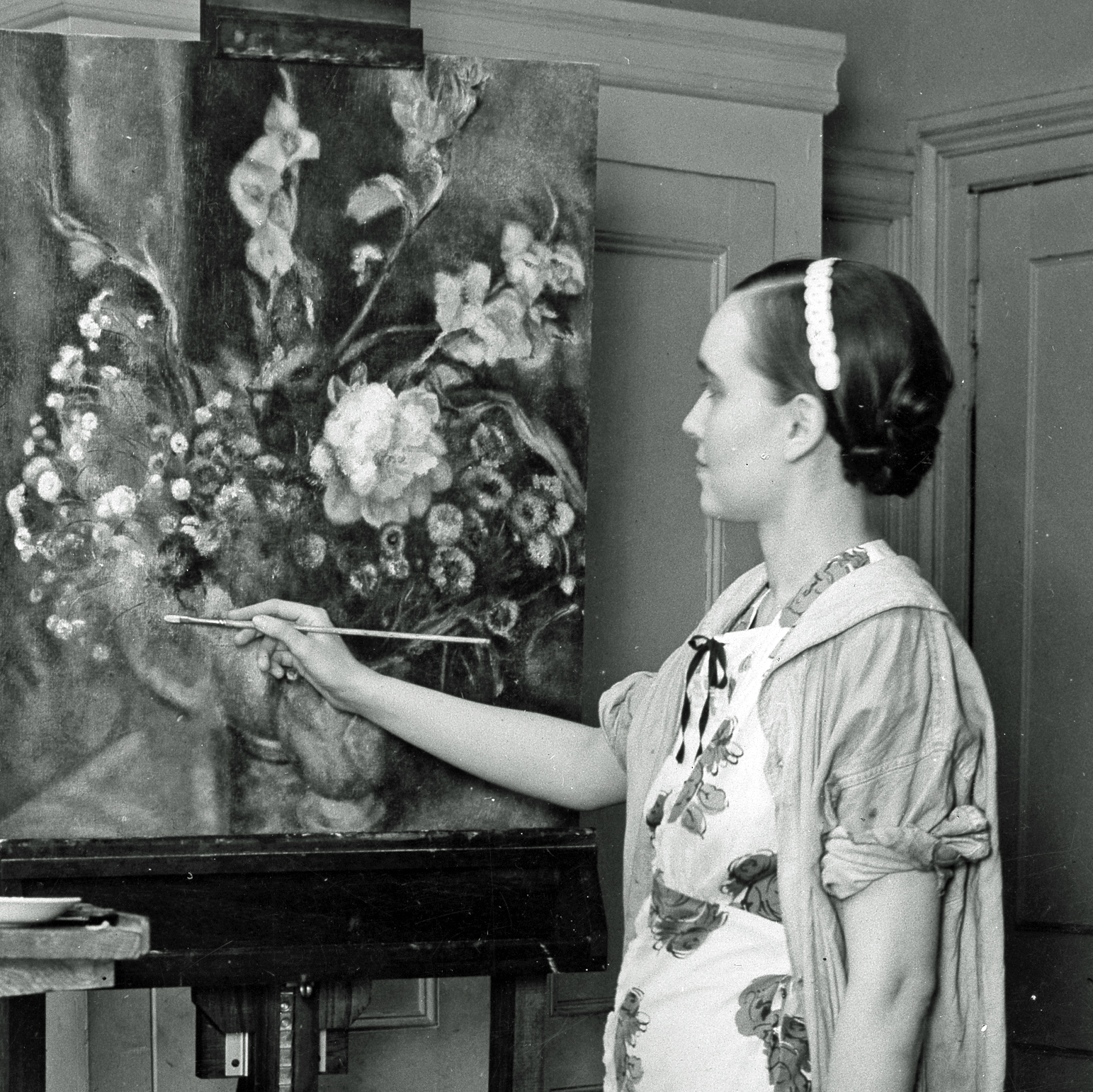
- Born: 1909
- Died: 1995 (aged 85–86)
- Known for: Muralist
- Spouse: Harold Black

Isabel Bate (1909–1995) was an American artist known for her work with the Works Progress Administration (WPA). She was married to fellow artist Harold Black (1913–1993). The couple lived in New York City. They were commissioned by the WPA to complete eight murals for the U.S. Post Office in Salina, Kansas. The couple completed the murals and sent them to Salina, but they were never installed. The couple also illustrated the 1941 book The Kaw: The Heart of a Nation by Floyd Benjamin Streeter. Bate's work was included in the 1940 Museum of Modern Art exhibition and competition The Artist as Reporter.

== Salina post office murals ==
Eight murals completed by Bate and Black were shipped from New York in 1942. A 2019 article How Murals In 26 Kansas Post Offices Tried To Cheer People Up During The Great Depression by Rylie Koester states that the murals were never received in Salina. In the Biographical Dictionary of Kansas Artists (active before 1945) Susan Craig states that the murals were never installed. An article in Time magazine stated that the murals were received in Salina, but that the Postmaster, Robert Pafford disliked the panels and consigned the crates to storage claiming that the post office did not have time to install them during the beginning years of World War II. Seven years later, at the request of the now divorced couple Bate and Black, the Post Office Department asked that the murals be installed. As of the writing of the article in 1949, Pafford still hadn't installed the murals claiming that "Salina had the most beautiful post office in the state; he was not going to have it ruined with pictures of 'privies and funny-looking women.' "
