= Robert Gibbon Johnson =

American lawyer (1771-1850)

Colonel Robert Gibbon Johnson
- His customary style was a ruffled shirt with his silvery hair in a queue.
- Born: July 23, 1771; Salem, New Jersey, British America
- Died: October 2, 1850 (aged 79); New Haven, Connecticut, United States
- Resting place: St John's Episcopal Church, Salem, NJ
- Education: Princeton
- Occupation: gentleman farmer
- Organizations: New Jersey Brigade; New Jersey Historical Society; New Jersey Horticultural Society; New Jersey State Legislature
- Known for: introduction of the tomato
- Notable work: An Historical Account of the First Settlement of Salem, in West Jersey
- Spouse(s): Hannah Carney, Juliana Zantzinger
- Children: Jane, Mary, Anna, Robert
- Parent(s): Robert Johnson, Jane Gibbon

Robert Gibbon Johnson (July 23, 1771 – October 2, 1850), also known as Colonel Johnson, was an American gentleman farmer, historian, horticulturalist, judge, soldier, and statesman who lived in Salem, New Jersey. He is especially renowned for the apocryphal story that he publicly ate a basket of tomatoes at the Old Salem County Courthouse in 1820 to demonstrate that they were not poisonous like many other nightshades, as was supposedy commonly thought at the time (tomatoes being primarily decorative plants to Westerners up to then). He was a keen antiquarian and wrote a history of Salem – An Historical Account of the First Settlement of Salem, in West Jersey – published by Orrin Rogers in 1839.

== Early life and education ==
Johnson was the only child of his parents, Robert Johnson and Jane Gibbon. He was born on July 23, 1771, at the home of his great-uncle, John Pledger – a large plantation in Mannington Township, New Jersey called the New Netherland Farm. He was visiting the farm in March 1778 when the British raided Salem during the American Revolutionary War and killed several of the inhabitants. The British commandeered Pledger's house, and Johnson was imprisoned with the family for several days. Still a young boy, he later led his mother away to safety.

His early education was in Pittsgrove where Reverend William Schenck taught him Presbyterianism. Johnson was subsequently educated at Newark Academy in Delaware and College of New Jersey from where he graduated in 1790. He had planned to practice law but instead concentrated on agriculture for most of his life, managing the large family estate.

== Domestic life ==
He married Hannah Carney on June 19, 1798. They had four children, but the first two daughters died in infancy. Their third daughter, Anne Gibbon Johnson, survived and married a Philadelphia lawyer, Ferdinand Hubbell. Their fourth and last child, Robert Carney Johnson, married Julia Harrison and went on to inherit the family estate in Salem.

Johnson and his mother moved into Salem town when his father died. They stayed in the house of his great-grandfather, Alexander Grant, which still stands today in Market Street. After marrying, he built a new house for the family in 1806–7 – Johnson Hall, also in Market Street. This was the first house built in Salem in the Federal style but has some idiosyncratic asymmetries, apparently for functional reasons. It is brick-built with two stories, five bays, a high roof with a balustrade, and fine interior woodwork. Johnson wanted this house to remain in the family, but it was sold to the county in 1922 and relocated when a new courthouse was built on the plot. But it still stands today nearby and houses the Chamber of Commerce, Visitors' Center, and similar offices.

Johnson's first wife, Hannah, died at about the age of thirty while her son Robert was still a child. In 1813, Johnson married Juliana Zantzinger, who was about 32 years old. Juliana lived until 1854 but had no further children.

Around 1826, Hetty Reckless, a Black woman whom Johnson enslaved, escaped to Philadelphia and sought the protection of abolitionists, claiming that Johnson's mother had promised her freedom and that Juliana mistreated her by pulling out her hair and knocking out two teeth with a broomstick. Johnson petitioned to reenslave her, but the suit was unsuccessful, and Reckless did not return to Salem until he had died.

== Military service and public offices ==
In 1794, Johnson served in the New Jersey brigade under Joseph Bloomfield as paymaster of its second regiment and saw action in the Whiskey Rebellion. In 1796, he was commissioned as a cavalry captain by Richard Howell and, in 1798, he was promoted to major. Subsequent governors promoted him to lieutenant-colonel in 1809 and full colonel in 1817. He was a keen equestrian and rode in a bold, erect style into his seventies.

In 1796, he was appointed a commissioner of the loan office for the county – a New Jersey institution founded to provide mortgages to local farmers to help their cash flow. In 1825, he was a member of the New Jersey Legislature and he served more than one term. In 1833, he was appointed as a county court judge and served for several terms. He also served as the trustee for Delaware College and Princeton Theological Seminary. He attended the Episcopal Church in Salem, but in 1820–21, he established the First Presbyterian Church in Salem and became its first elder in 1823.

He was a keen local historian, and in 1839, his An Historical Account of the First Settlement of Salem, in West Jersey was published. He maintained a collection of important local historical documents and was instrumental in establishing a public library in Salem. He was a founding member of the New Jersey Historical Society and was its first vice president since its founding in 1845. In 1846, he presented a paper on John Fenwick, Chief Proprietor of Salem Tenth to the society in Elizabethtown.

== Farming ==
Johnson was an active horticulturist and was a president of the New Jersey Horticultural Society, and wrote about draining marshland in The American Farmer in 1826. Johnson's later reputation credited him with introducing the tomato into the area around 1820. Tomatoes became a significant crop in southern New Jersey, which was able to ship its fresh, ripe produce to the local large markets of New York and Philadelphia.

=== Tomato story ===
Although much contemporary material relating to Johnson survives, the first written claim associating him with the introduction of the tomato to Salem dates only to the early 20th century. The apocryphal story accompanying this posthumous reputation was popularized by Joseph Sickler, the Salem postmaster, who told Harry Emerson Wildes an anecdote about Johnson publicly eating tomatoes to prove their safety on account of the plant being in the nightshade family. Wildes published the story in his book The Delaware in 1940 and Stewart Holbrook then dramatized the event in his 1946 book, Lost Men of American History, adding dialogue to the tale. With Sickler as a consultant, the CBS radio show You Are There then broadcast a re-enactment of the event in 1949. The legend of Johnson's daring deed then became well-established in numerous works and retold in further dramatic accounts:

Col. Johnson announced that he would eat a tomato, also called the wolf peach, Jerusalem apple or love apple, on the steps of the county courthouse at noon. ... That morning, in 1820, about 2000 people were jammed into the town square. ... The spectators began to hoot and jeer. Then, 15 minutes later, Col. Johnson emerged from his mansion and headed up Market Street towards the Courthouse. The crowd cheered. The fireman's band struck up a lively tune. He was a very impressive-looking man as he walked along the street. He was dressed in his usual black suit with white ruffles, black shoes and gloves, tricorn hat, and cane. At the Court House steps he spoke to the crowd about the history of the tomato. ... He picked a choice one from a basket on the steps and held it up so that it glistened in the sun. ... "To help dispel the tall tales, the fantastic fables that you have been hearing ... And to prove to you that it is not poisonous I am going to eat one right now"... There was not a sound as the Col. dramatically brought the tomato to his lips and took a bite. A woman in the crowd screamed and fainted but no one paid her any attention; they were all watching Col. Johnson as he took one bite after another. ... He raised both his arms, and again bit into one and then the other. The crowd cheered and the firemen's band blared a song. ... "He's done it", they shouted. "He's still alive"

— The Story of Robert Gibbon Johnson and the Tomato, Salem County Historical Society

For a period in the 1980s, Salem celebrated "Robert Gibbon Johnson Day" by re-enacting the dramatic event with live actors in costume. In 1988, Good Morning America reported that Johnson was the first to eat a tomato in the United States, but there are hundreds such stories about other individuals – Thomas Jefferson, a Shaker bride, immigrant Italians (e.g., Michele Felice Cornè), and many others – even though the tomato was long recognized as edible throughout Europe and Central and South America.
