= Harold Black =

Harold Black may refer to:

- Harold Stephen Black (1898–1983), American electrical engineer
- Harold Black (artist) (1913–1993), American artist
- Sir Harold Black (civil servant) (1914–1981), British civil servant
