= Mr. and Mrs. Elliot =

Short story by Ernest Hemingway

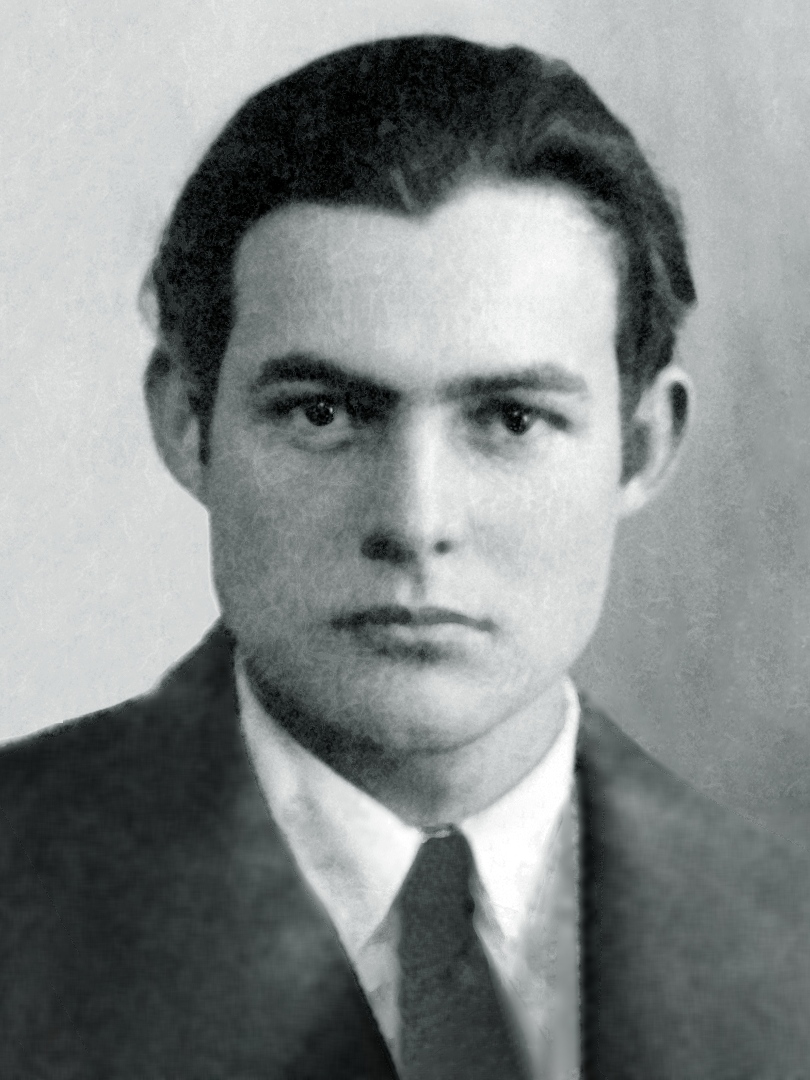
Ernest Hemingway in 1923

"Mr. and Mrs. Elliot" is a short story written by Ernest Hemingway. The story was first published in The Little Review in 1924 and republished by Boni & Liveright in Hemingway's first American volume of short stories, In Our Time, in 1925.

The story is about a 25-year-old Harvard student who follows a "clean" life. He marries a 40-year-old clean Southern woman in Boston and the next day they set off to Europe and they 'try very hard to have a baby'. They travel to Paris, then Dijon and finally at a chateau in Touraine. Eventually both become disenchanted with each other, and the wife's girlfriend moves in to live with her.

The story was initially titled "Mr. and Mrs. Smith" when it first appeared in The Little Review; it was reputedly based on the 1921-4 marriage of writer Chard Powers Smith and his wife Olive Macdonald. Smith resented Hemingway's story for the rest of his life.

== Sources ==
- Baker, Carlos. American Literature, vol. 40, no. 4, 1969, pp. 572–74. JSTOR, https://doi.org/10.2307/2923238. Accessed 14 Mar. 2023.
- Hemingway, Ernest. (1925/1930) In Our Time. (1996 ed.) New York: Scribner. ISBN 0-684-82276-8
- Oliver, Charles (1999). Ernest Hemingway A to Z: The Essential Reference to the Life and Work. New York: Checkmark Publishing. ISBN 978-0-8160-3467-3
- Tetlow, Wendolyn E. (1992). Hemingway's "In Our Time": Lyrical Dimensions. Cranbury NJ: Associated University Presses. ISBN 978-0-8387-5219-7
