= Hubert Klyne Headley =

American composer, pianist and organist

Hubert Klyne Headley (1906–1996) was an American composer, musician, and educator.

== Early life and education ==
Headley was born at Parkersburg, West Virginia on June 19, 1906. When he was six, his family moved to Fresno, California. His father, Lewis Lee Headley, was Superintendent of Schools, and his mother, Belle Cook Headley, was an organist. At the age of ten he was introduced to Maurice Ravel, whose music had a strong effect on him. He studied music at the University of the Pacific in Stockton, California, graduating in 1928. While there, he met Flora Denius of Vallejo, also a student at the college's music conservatory, whom he married in 1929.

For eight years, Headley served as director of instrumental music for California high schools, and earned a master's degree from the Eastman School of Music in Rochester, New York, where he later worked toward a Doctorate of Philosophy. He studied composition with Nadia Boulanger and Howard Hanson.

== Career ==
In the fall of 1935, Headley joined the music department of Fresno State College, replacing Assistant Professor Arthur C. Berdahl. Although he had produced and performed various short compositions on violin, piano, and organ since the 1920s, his first work to receive national attention was The Jester's Dream, a symphonic composition completed in the summer of 1935, and subsequently performed by the Chicago Symphony Orchestra.

Headley's most famous work is the California Suite, an orchestral work commissioned by Standard Oil of California for the Golden Gate International Exposition in 1939. The work was premiered by the San Francisco Symphony, conducted by Pierre Monteux. Monteux later conducted part of the work in a radio concert for The Standard Symphony Hour. Headley's works would be performed regularly on this program for the next several years. Howard Hanson conducted the Rochester Civic Orchestra (Note: The Rochester Civic Orchestra, with its auxiliaries, became the Rochester Philharmonic Orchestra.) performing the California Suite for the NBC Radio Network in January of 1941.

Also in 1939, Headley joined the faculty at Santa Barbara State College, and succeeded Maurice Faulkner as conductor of the University of California Symphony Orchestra in Santa Barbara. Here he began to hone his reputation as a composer and pianist, giving various concerts at which he conducted his own works.

In 1942, José Iturbi conducted the premiere of Headley's Argentango, a concerto for piano and orchestra, with the Rochester Philharmonic Orchestra. Later that year, Headley performed a "piano sketch" of what would eventually become his Symphony No. 2, Prelude to Man, based on the poem by Chard Powers Smith, about the stages of the development of life on earth prior to the advent of mankind. The work would not be completed until 1951, at which time Headley took it to New York to present to Howard Hanson, Leonard Bernstein, and other leading figures in the musical world.

Headley enlisted in the United States Army Air Forces in January, 1943, training to become a transport pilot during World War II, and receiving military leave from Santa Barbara State College. After his wartime service concluded, the U.S. State Department asked him to report on the familiarity of Europeans with American cultural life during a visit to France and England. Based on his experiences, Headley concluded that Europeans were most familiar with American culture through Hollywood films and Swing music, and recommended that funds be expended to acquaint them with the nation's other cultural developments. Headley subsequently gave performances in Paris, London, Budapest, and Prague.

In 1948, Headley was invited to serve as guest conductor of the Standard Symphony Hour, which had regularly performed his compositions. He continued to premiere new works into the 1950s. He was named conductor of the Fresno Municipal Symphony Orchestra, and was also a guest conductor of the Duluth Symphony Orchestra.

In 1953, Headley married Joan Stechman of Los Angeles, a ballet dancer and musician. After Headley left Santa Barbara College in 1954, he and his wife moved to Seattle, Washington, where Headley taught at the Cornish School of Applied Arts. In 1960, they moved to Langley, British Columbia, where Headley taught music in area elementary schools, and was band instructor at Aldergrove High School, while Jean taught ballet at York House School in Vancouver. In the late 1960s, Headley moved to Greater Sudbury, Ontario, where he helped to develop the music program at Cambrian College. He then returned to Vancouver, where he lived until his death in 1996.

== Legacy ==
By the late twentieth century, Headley's music was largely forgotten, and many of his works are lost. In 2006, his music resurfaced by accident. For the one hundredth anniversary of his birth, Russian State TV performed several of Headley's compositions, including the California Suite, conducted by Dmitry Yablonsky, a conductor who has focussed on reviving forgotten or hitherto unknown music. In 2007, Robert Buckley, one of Headley's former students, and Stan MacDaniel took joint responsibility for the recordings of his music. Subsequently, the Naxos record label published a CD of Headley's music in an "American Classics" series.

== Compositions (selection) ==
Orchestral

- 1935 The Jester's Dream
  1. Dance
  2. Love Song
  3. Processional
- 1939 California Suite, for orchestra (composed for the inauguration of the 1939 Golden Gate Exposition in San Francisco)
  1. Golden Gate
  2. Yosemite
  3. Fiesta
- 1941 Concerto No. 1 (Argentango), for piano and orchestra
- 1945 Concerto No. 2, for piano and orchestra
- 1946 Symphony No. 1 (for Radio), for orchestra
- 1951 Symphony No. 2 (Prelude to Man), for soprano, alto, tenor, bass solo, mixed chorus, speaking chorus, orchestra and ballet (also known as: Prelude to Man, a symphonic cycle in four parts) (text: Chard Powers Smith)
  1. Fountain of Being
  2. Pan, the Body
  3. Jehovah, the Mind
  4. Brahma, the Spirit
  5. The Fountain of Being

Operas

- 1946 Noche Serena
- 1961-1962 The darkened city, opera in 3 acts (libretto: Robert Glynn Kelly)

Piano

- 1942 Prelude to Man, piano sketch that would later become his Symphony No. 2
- 1945 Caprice Espagnole
- 1945 Reminiscences
  1. Sculpture
  2. Old Music
  3. Turbulence
  4. The Poet
  5. Mirage
- 1950 Variations on a Theme from the Hebrides

Choral

- 1945 Pastorale Sililoquy
  1. Like Cathedral Trees
  2. Like Lakes and Streams
  3. Like a Boy Whistling
  4. Like a Boy and his God
- 1968 Peace, for orchestra and children's choir

Chamber

- 1954 Sonate, for cello and piano
- 1954 Sonata Ibérica, for cello and piano
- 1957 Quintet in two parts, for piano, strings and clarinet
- Septet, for winds and strings

Ballet

- 1945 Vignettes for Ballet
  1. Flute at Evening
  2. Cups of Jade
  3. Bell at Evening
  4. Puppets
  5. The Pool
  6. Song of Songs

Other

- 1927 "The Fairies Have Never A Penny To Spend"
- 1927 "Lullaby"
- 1927 "A Mood"
- 1927 "Ballet Burlesque"
- 1928 "Sweetheart Why Don't You Answer Me?" (waltz ballad)
