= Harold Black (artist) =

American artist

- Born: December 13, 1913; New York City, US
- Died: January 23, 1993 (aged 79); Mexico City, Mexico
- Known for: Muralist, painter

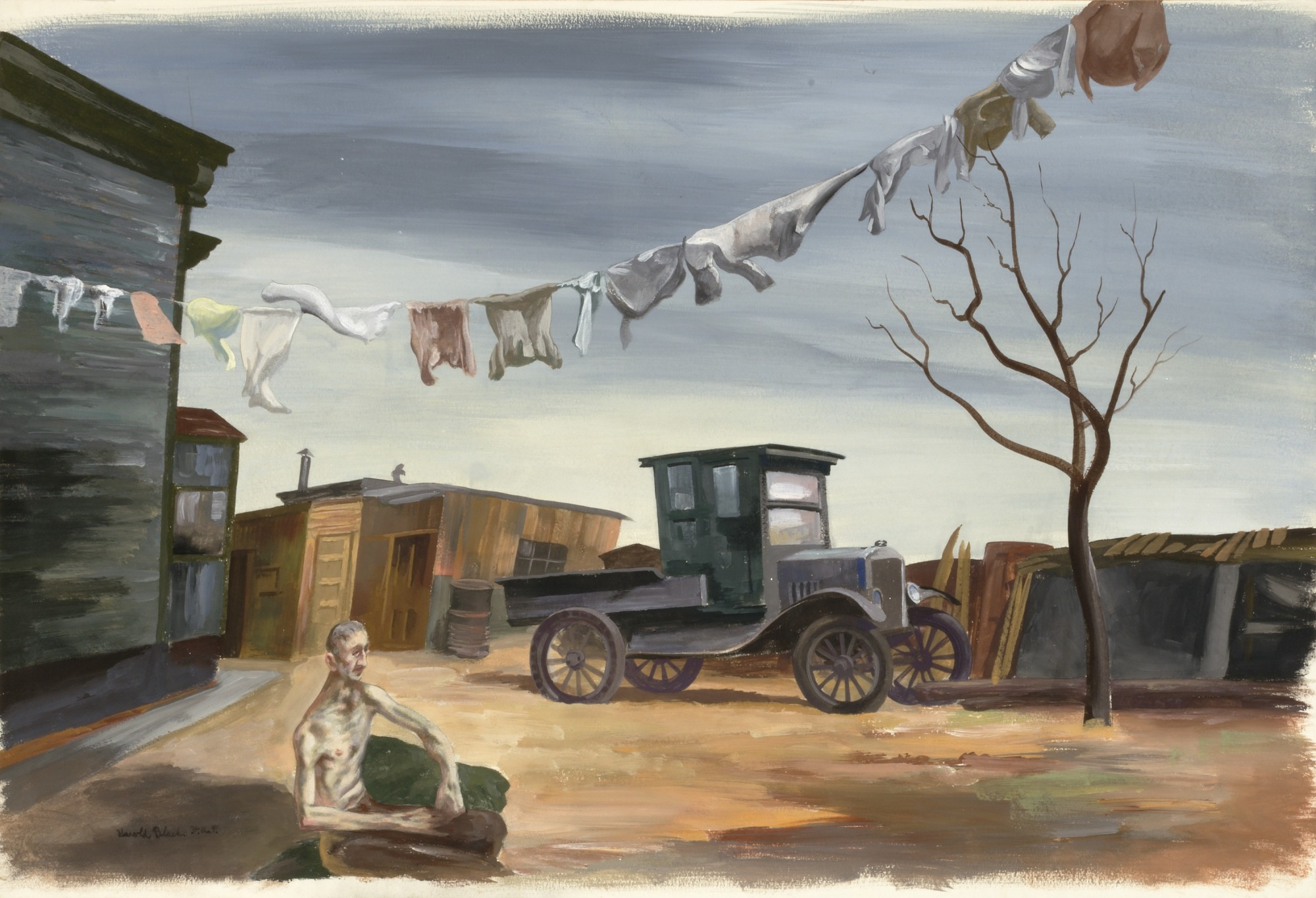
Sunbath ca. 1940, gouache on paperboard

Harold Black (1913–1993) was an American artist known for his work with the Works Progress Administration (WPA). Born on December 13, 1913, in New York City he attended National Academy of Design. He was married to fellow artist Isabel Bate (1909–1995). The couple lived in New York City. They were commissioned by the WPA to complete eight murals for the U.S. Post Office in Salina, Kansas. The couple completed the murals and sent them to Salina, but they were never installed. The couple also illustrated the 1941 book The Kaw: The Heart of a Nation by Floyd Benjamin Streeter. Black's work was included in the 1940 Museum of Modern Art exhibition and competition The Artist as Reporter.

Black died on January 23, 1993, in Mexico City, Mexico. His work is in the collection of the Smithsonian American Art Museum.
