= New York Weekly Messenger =

American newspaper

- Categories: Newspaper
- Frequency: Weekly
- Founder: Barber Badger
- Founded: 1831
- First issue: 1831
- Country: United States
- Based in: New York City
- Language: English

New York Weekly Messenger was a weekly periodical that was established in the 1830s in New York City.

== Early history ==
Badger's Weekly Messenger was established by Barber Badger on July 4, 1831, in New York City, New York until July 11, 1832. It was soon continued as the New York Weekly Messenger from 1832 to 1833. From 1833 to 1836, the publication underwent a name change, becoming the New York Weekly Messenger, and Young Men's Advocate. In 1836, the publication shortened its name back to New York Weekly Messenger.

The publication was committed to covering topics in religion, literature, science, agriculture, commerce, and public affairs.

The editor, Barber Badger, launched the project after having been the editor of the Methodist Episcopal Church's weekly newspaper, The Christian Advocate starting in 1826.

The New York Weekly Messenger was first published by Barber Badger and William Burnett. In 1832, the publishers Burnett & Smith published the newspaper at 17 Ann Street in Manhattan. It was later published by Abijah Abbot from 1836 to 1837.
