= Anne B. Fisher =

American novelist

Anne Benson Fisher (February 1, 1898 – March 5, 1967) was an American writer of fiction and non-fiction whose primary emphasis was California. Her two most significant works were her novel Cathedral in the Sun (1940) and her contribution to the Rivers of America Series, The Salinas: Upside Down River (1945).

In 1922 Fisher married Walter Kenrick Fisher. They resided in Pacific Grove, California, and also had a house in Carmel Valley. Fisher moved to Medford, Oregon after her husband's death. Her novel Cathedral in the Sun was based on the lives of the early settlers of the Carmel Valley, James Meadows and Loretta Onesimo de Peralta, who were married in 1842.

Cathedral in the Sun led to an invitation by Stephen Vincent Benét to write about the Salinas River for the Rivers of America Series

== Non-fiction ==
- Wide Road ahead: the story of a woman bacteriologist E. P. Dutton, [New York], 1939
- Bears, Pirates and Silver Lace - Stories of Old California, Binfords & Mort, Portland, Oregon, 1944, 134 pp. Illustrated by Phil Nesbitt
- The Salinas: Upside Down River, Farrar and Rinehart, New York City, 1945
- No More a Stranger: A Tale of Robert Louis Stevenson, Stanford University Press, Stanford University, California, 1946, 265 pp.
- Stories California Indians Told, Parnassus Press, Berkeley, California, 1957, 110 pp, Illustrated By Ruth Robbins

== Fiction ==
- Cathedral in the Sun, Carlyle House, New York, 1940, 408pp.
- It's a Wise Child: A Disorderly Comedy of Fatherhood, Bobbs-Merrill, Indianapolis, 1949, 281 pp.
- Oh Glittering Promise! A Novel of the California Gold Rush, Bobbs-Merrill, Indianapolis, 1949, 294 pp
