= Frederick Gutheim =

American historian

Frederick Albert Gutheim (March 3, 1908 – October 2, 1993) was an urban planner and historian, architect, and author. He is noted for writing The Potomac, a history of the Potomac River and the 40th volume in the Rivers of America Series, and Worthy of the Nation a history of the development of Washington, D.C.

== Career ==
Gutheim was born in Cambridge, Massachusetts, and earned a Bachelor of Arts degree from the University of Wisconsin in 1931, and did graduate work at the University of Chicago. He served in the Army during World War II.

In addition to writing many books, Gutheim served as the staff director of the joint congressional committee on Washington Metropolitan Problems and was the president of the Washington Center for Metropolitan Studies. He was also on the JFK's Advisory Council on Pennsylvania Avenue and the National Capital Regional Planning Council.

While serving on these committees, he wrote articles for the New York Herald Tribune, Progressive Architecture, Inland Architect and the Washington Post. Gutheim taught or held administrator positions as the University of Michigan, Williams College, George Washington University, and the Harvard Graduate School of Design.

The pinnacle of his career may have been the photographic exhibition at the National Gallery of Art in Washington, D.C. that he created of American architecture to celebrate 100th anniversary of the American Institute of Architects. The exhibition was heralded as an important landmark in American architecture, journalism, and academia.

Later in his career, in 1972, Gutheim was the national chairman of the Frederick Law Olmsted Sesquicentennial Committee.
