= Old Salem County Courthouse =

Coordinates: 39°34′20″N 75°28′00″W

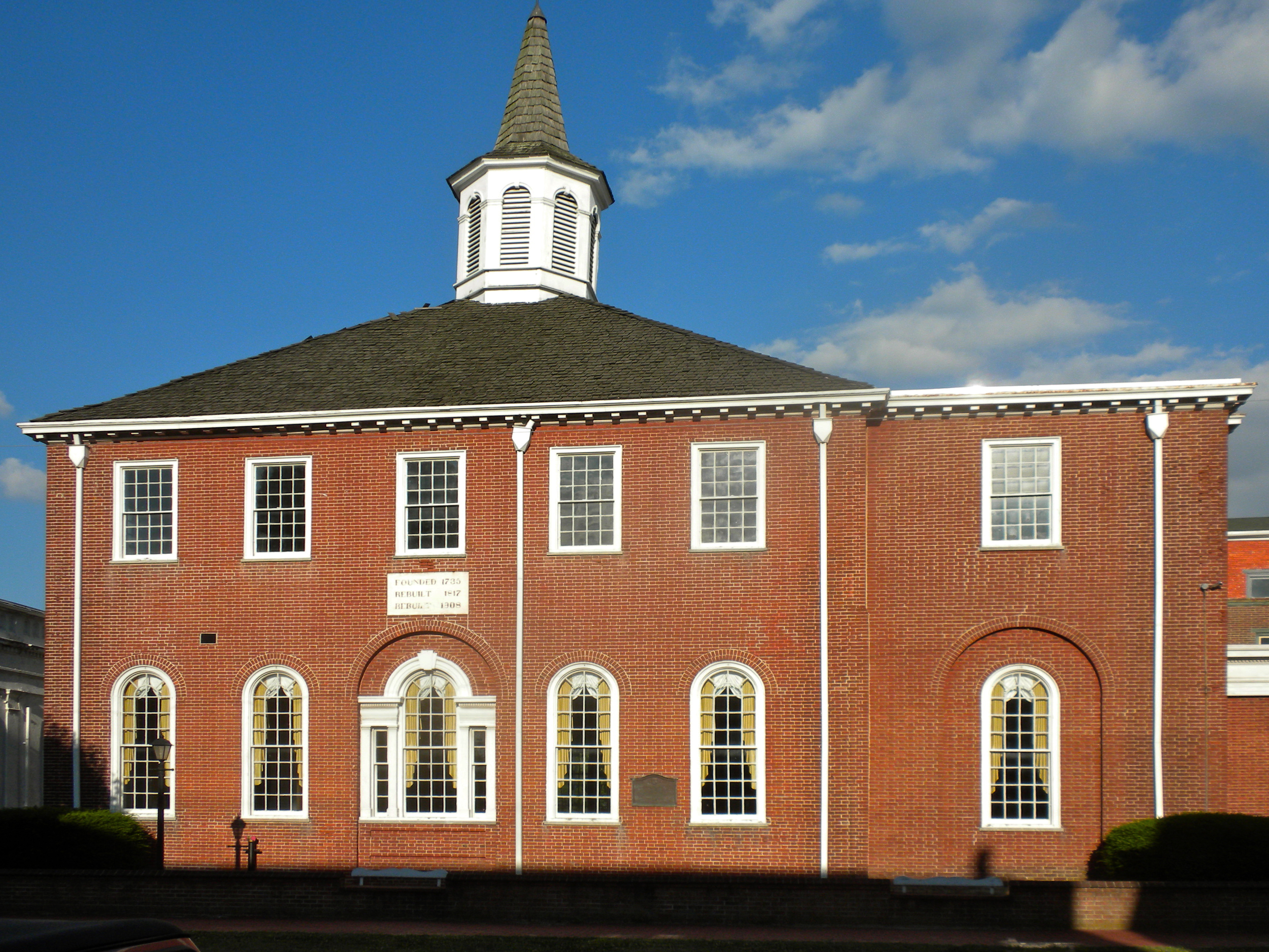

The Old Salem County Courthouse is a courthouse located in Salem, Salem County, New Jersey.

Built in 1735, this building is the oldest active courthouse in New Jersey and is the second oldest courthouse still in continuous use in the United States. It was expanded in 1818 and 1908.

It is a contributing property of the Market Street Historic District.

== History ==
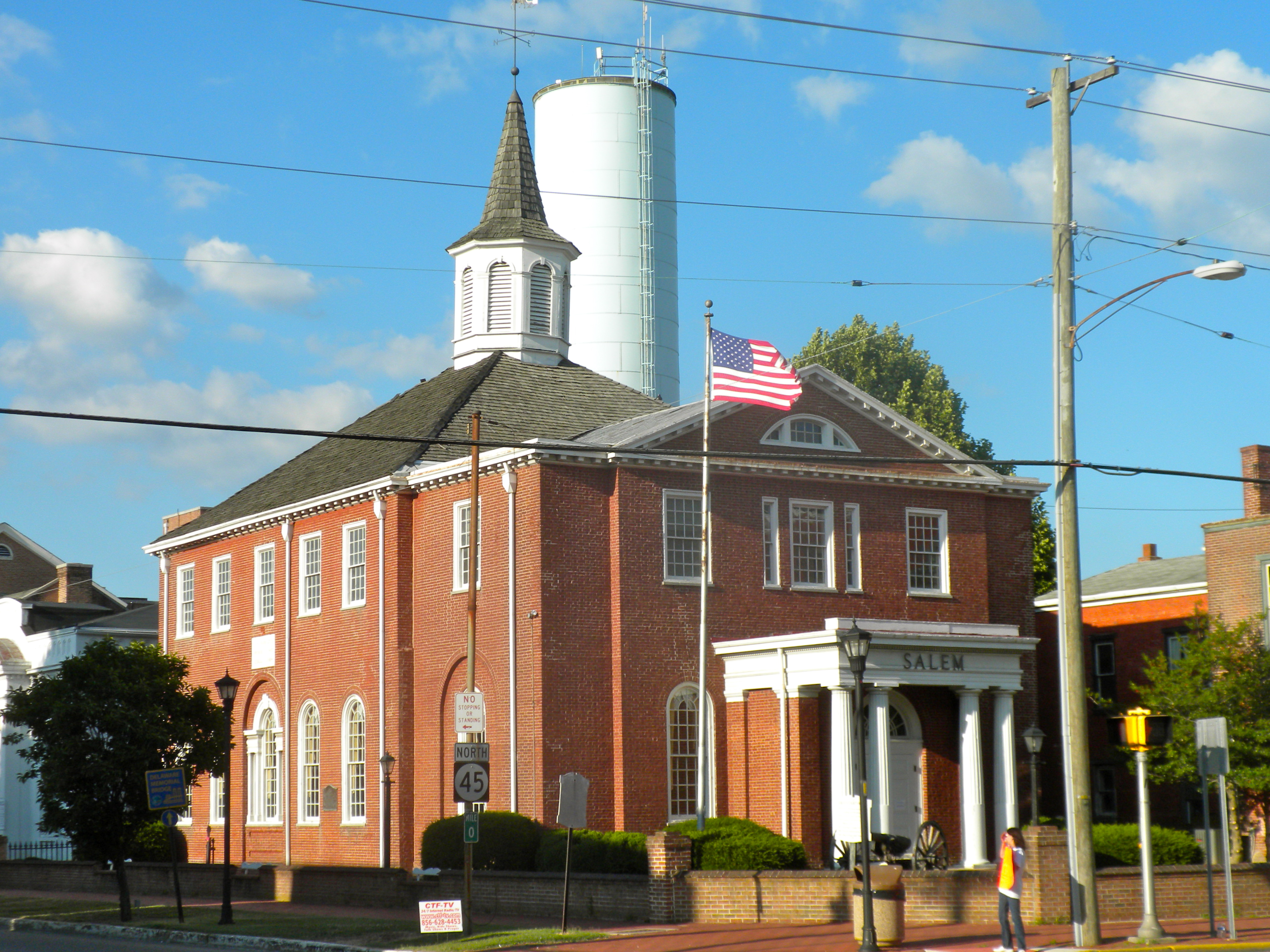

It was built in 1735 using locally manufactured bricks and was enlarged in 1817 and 1908. It served as the courthouse for Salem County until 1969 when a larger and more modern facility was built for the county. Today it serves as the courthouse for the Salem City Municipal Court.

In 1774, the courthouse was the site of a county petition to King George III to address various colonial grievances and for authorizing county relief to the citizens of Boston to assist them from the King's sanctions from the Boston Tea Party incident. Judge William Hancock of the King's Court of Common Pleas presided at the courthouse. He was later unintentionally killed by British soldiers in the American Revolution during the massacre of Hancock House (New Jersey) committed by the British against local Revolutionary militia during the Salem Raid in 1778. The courthouse was afterwards the scene of the "treason trials" of 1778, wherein suspected Loyalists were put on trial for having allegedly aided the British during the Salem Raid. Four men were convicted and sentenced to death for treason; however, they were pardoned by Governor William Livingston and exiled from New Jersey.

The courthouse is also the site of the legend of Colonel Robert Gibbon Johnson proving the edibility of the tomato. Before 1820, Americans often assumed tomatoes were poisonous. In 1820, Colonel Johnson, according to legend, stood upon the courthouse steps and ate tomatoes in front of a large amazed crowd assembled to watch him do so.

== New Salem County Court House ==
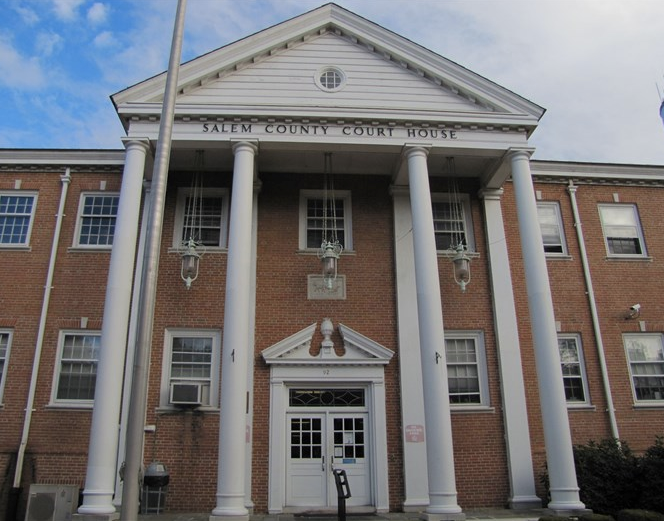

A new courthouse designed by Edwards & Green was built in 1967–1968 in the modern Colonial style. It is part of the 15th vicinage.

The building is considered inadequate to handle the needs of the court, with court officials citing security concerns, inadequate accessibility for persons with disabilities, and insufficient space. The court also makes use of Fenwick Building (built in 1891 and renovated 1989) across the street. In September 2017, the court appointed an arbitrator to address the courthouse issue after the court ordered it to do so. However, the board of commissioners of the county are against any major courthouse project; on the November 2017 ballot, the commissioners voted 6-1 to place a non-binding referendum: "Are you in favor of construction of a new Salem County Courthouse at county taxpayer expense?" A majority of voters said no to the proposal.

== See also ==
- List of the oldest courthouses in the United States
- County courthouses in New Jersey
- Richard J. Hughes Justice Complex
- Federal courthouses in New Jersey
- Courts of New Jersey
