= Johnson Hall (Salem, New Jersey) =

Coordinates: 39°34′28″N 75°28′0″W

Johnson Hall is the house built by Colonel Robert Johnson in the Federal style for his new wife in 1806–7. It is in the historic Market Street of Salem, New Jersey.

The house was left to Col. Johnson's daughter, Anna Hubbell. It subsequently became the property of the county and was moved when a new courthouse was built on the site. It is now used as the offices of local organizations including the Chamber of Commerce and Visitor Center.
