= Cecile Hulse Matschat =

American botanist and geographer (1895–1976)

Cecile Hulse Matschat (1895–March 4, 1976) was an American geographer and botanist, known best as the author of books on gardens, gardening and the Okefenokee Swamp.

== Biography ==
Cecile Hulse Matschat was born in 1895 and grew up in upstate New York, later studying art at the Pratt Institute.

Growing up, she began studying orchids in nearby swamps and in New Jersey, eventually expanding her explorations to the Everglades, West Indies, Central America and Mexico. She collected the orchids for paintings.

Throughout Matschat's career, she wrote 16 books including her Rivers of America book on the Suwannee River —Suwanee River: Strange Green Land (Farrar & Rinehart, 1938)— provided rare insight into the society and history of the people of the Okefenokee Swamp. She won a Literary Guild award and membership in the Explorer's Club for the work. Matschat was a member of the Society of Woman Geographers from 1937 to 1966.

Matschat died on March 4, 1976, in New York City.

== Works ==
- Mexican Plants for American Gardens (Houghton Mifflin Co., Boston, 1935)
- The Garden Calendar (Houghton Mifflin, 1936)
- The Garden Primers (Houghton Mifflin, 1937), illustrated by Jean Martin
  - How to Make a Garden
  - Planning the Home Grounds
  - Annuals and Perennials
  - Shrubs and Trees
  - Bulbs and House Plants
- Suwanee River: Strange Green Land (Farrar & Rinehart, New York, 1938), illus. Alexander Key – Volume 3 of the Rivers of America Series
- Seven Grass Huts: An Engineer's Wife in Central And South America (Farrar & Rinehart, 1939), illus. Matschat
- American Wild Flowers (Random House, New York, 1940)
- Preacher on Horseback (Farrar & Rinehart, 1940; Cassell, London, 1941)
- Murder in Okefenokee (Farrar & Rinehart, 1941)
- American Butterflies and Moths (Random House, 1942), illus. Rudolf Freund
- Tavern in the Town (Farrar & Rinehart, 1942; Cassell, 1944)
- Highway to Heaven (Farrar & Rinehart, 1942)
- Murder at the Black Crook' (Farrar & Rinehart, 1943; Cassell, 1945)
- Land of the Big Swamp: A Story of the Okefenokee Settlement (John C. Winston, Philadelphia, 1954), illus. Alexander Key
- Animals Of The Valley Of The Amazon (Abelard-Schuman, New York, 1965), illus. Edward Osmond
