= Richard Elwell Banta =

Indiana writer and publisher

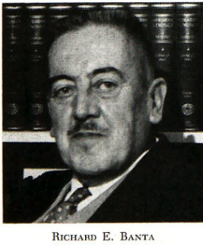
Banta photographed in 1961

Richard Elwell Banta (1904–1977) was an Indiana writer, rare book dealer, publisher and humorist. Born in Martinsville, he attended school in Crawfordsville and college at Wabash College. While there, he was involved with several humor publications. He went on to work in various capacities at the college. Banta began selling rare books in 1930, and published his first book in 1932. He wrote The Ohio for the Rivers of America series and compiled an exhaustive listing of early Indiana authors. Richard Banta died on December 4, 1977.

Although he did not complete a degree at Wabash College, Banta was very active there both during and after his time as a student. While a student (1921–1925), he contributed articles and illustrations to The Chicago Daily News, College Humor, and Weird Tales. He also founded the college humor magazine The Caveman with DeWitte O'Keiffe, in 1924. After starting advertising, publishing, and book-selling businesses, Banta worked for the college under President Frank H. Sparks from 1937 to 1955. In 1961, Banta was given an honorary Doctor of Literature degree by Wabash College. He was a member of the Society of American Historians, and a Fellow, American Academy of Social and Political Science. He retired from business in 1969, but remained active around Crawfordsville for the rest of his life.

== Literary criticism ==
In Hoosier Caravan, Banta brought together over 70 pieces of published prose and poetry, each prefaced by him with commentary on the author and the piece. While generally a great promoter of Indiana literature, Banta was less than wholehearted about well-known writers such as Edward Eggleston: ".. he never quite achieved a sympathetic or even a reasonably tolerant attitude toward Indiana or Indianians. He saw nothing beneath the surface faults; he never succeeded in coming even near to transcribing the speech, or understanding the motives of Midwesterners; he was pretentious and he was a bit spiteful." (p. 142),

"Oliver [Johnson] probably knew a great deal about early school, while Eggleston, writing 'The Hoosier Schoolmaster', was experienced only as a door-to-door Bible salesman at the time he wrote. He [Eggleston] had attended a small town school only two or three years - and it, at Vevay, Indiana [an old settlement on the Ohio River] was probably one of the better ones. He had not had much chance to witness the travail with which schoolmastering was beset. (p. 571, referring to Johnson's account of attending school in 1828.) (It is said that Eggleston's book was based on the teaching experiences of his brother George.)

James Whitcomb Riley: "Here then are the facts of life circa 1822-30 set down in pure, basic Hoosier. This is unlike what Eggleston and Riley heard or thought they recalled hearing." (p. 504, referring to a piece by Oliver Johnson)

and Theodore Dreiser: "[Corbin Patrick] delivered this appraisal of Indiana's problem child of letters: it is probably the perfect expression of the mingled respect and distaste with which the average literate Hoosier regarded the subject [Theodore Dreiser] during his life." (p. 372)

== Bibliography ==
=== Author ===
- William C. Smith, Gentleman Bookseller (pamphlet), 1940
- Indiana Authors and Their Books, 1816-1916, Wabash College, Crawfordsville, IN, 1949
- The Ohio, Rivers of America, Rinehart & Company, New York, 1949
- Hoosier Caravan, a Treasury of Indiana Life and Lore, Indiana University Press, Bloomington, IN, 1951
- Life in America, The South, The Fideler Company, Grand Rapids, MI, 1951
- General Carrington's Hoosier Debacle (pamphlet), New York: Posse Brand Book, 1957.
- Benjamin Fuller and Some of His Descendants 1765-1958, Crawfordsville, Indiana: 1958.
- The Ohio Valley, A Students' Guide, New York: Teachers College Press, Teachers College, Columbia University, 1966
- Hoosier Caravan (new and enlarged edition), Indiana University Press, Bloomington, IN, 1975
- A Century of Banking - The First National Bank and Trust Co., 1864-1964
- Crawfordsville Centennial - One Hundred Forty-Three Years in Hoosier Athens
- Frances Cayou: Two Sketches, with Byron K. Trippet
- The American Conchology: A Venture in Backwoods Book Printing (illustrated), The Colophon (new series), vol. III, issue 1, pp.24-40

=== Publisher ===
- Osborne, James I. and Theodore G. Gronert, R.E. Banta, illustrator (1932), Wabash College, the First Hundred Years, Crawfordsville: R.E. Banta.
- Esarey, Logan (1947),The Indiana Home, Crawfordsville: R.E. Banta.
- Barnhart, John D. (1951), Henry Hamilton and George Rogers Clark in the American Revolution, with the Unpublished Journal of Lieut. Governor Henry Hamilton, Crawfordsville: R.E. Banta.
- Griffith, Barton, Diary of Barton Griffith, Covington, Indiana, 1832-1834
