= Margaret Sanborn =

American writer (1915–2005)

- Born: 1915
- Died: 2005 (aged 89–90)
- Occupations: Writer and biographer
- Children: 2

Margaret Sanborn (1915–2005) was an American writer and biographer of Robert E. Lee and Mark Twain. She came to prominence in 1966 with the publication of Robert E. Lee: A Portrait [1807-1861], the first volume of her two-volume biography of the Confederate general which won critical acclaim.

In an interview given in 1997 at the Library of Congress, Sanborn relates the story of how she came to be the writer of the final volume in the Rivers of America Series, The American, River of El Dorado. In 2004, she received a Milley Award.

Margaret Sanborn resided in Mill Valley, California, north of San Francisco near the Pacific Ocean. She had at least two children and died early in 2005.

== Partial bibliography ==
- Robert E. Lee. A Portrait. [1807-1861] (Lippincott, Philadelphia, 1966)
- Robert E. Lee: the Complete Man 1861-1870 (Lippincott, Philadelphia, 1967)
- The American: River of El Dorado (Holt, Rinehart and Winston, New York, 1974)
- The Grand Tetons (G. P. Putnam's Sons, New York, 1978)
- Yosemite – Its Discovery, Its Wonders & Its People (Random House, New York, 1981)
- Mark Twain: The Bachelor Years: A Biography (Doubleday, New York, 1990)
