= Geoffrey M. Footner =

American historian

Geoffrey Marsh Footner
- Born: September 1, 1923; Baltimore, Maryland
- Died: April 5, 2018 (aged 94); Towson, Maryland
- Education: Loyola College
- Relatives: Hulbert Footner (father)
- Writing career
- Language: English
- Genre: Maritime

Geoffrey Marsh Footner (September 1, 1923 – April 5, 2018) was a proponent of pollution control and maritime historian who wrote articles and books about the wooden sailing yachts and commercial sailing vessels indigenous to the Chesapeake Bay.

== Early life and education ==
Footner was born in Baltimore, Maryland, the son of Gladys Marsh and (William) Hulbert Footner, a fiction and nonfiction writer. His academic education at Loyola College was interrupted by enlistment in the United States Navy on July 1, 1943. He served in the Pacific and Atlantic theaters, and resigned his lieutenancy on January 19, 1954. He reentered Loyola College and received its liberal arts diploma following a period of further study.

== Business and Farming Career ==
In 1950, Footner established an international cargo brokerage firm, Footner & Company, with offices at the ports of Baltimore and New York and satellite air cargo offices at New York and Baltimore's international airports. Footner and cargo broker Rolf Graage formed a company named Intermodal Transports, Inc., to containerize cargo for export by plane or ship. Cargo container shipping was new at the time, and his port management company, Bay Shipping Agency of Baltimore and Norfolk, grew rapidly,( routing container vessels of the Dart Container Line between New York, Norfolk, Antwerp and other northern European ports, and moving them by barge and overland under one bill of lading. The firm contracted with several foreign-owned container lines. He sold Footner and Company in 1972, and his shipping company to the Evergreen Line of Taiwan in 1979. He then left the shipping business, returning occasionally as a consultant.

Footner began farming in the 1980s. Although the term "organic" was not yet in common use, he avoided using artificial fertilizers and pesticides. He sold grapes to Maryland winemakers and Eastern Shore and produce to Baltimore restaurants. Footner began writing articles about the degradation of the estuaries of the Chesapeake Bay, and promoting sustainable agriculture to stem the deterioration. He recommended the organization of a Chesapeake Bay Authority.

== Writing Career ==
Footner continued to write papers on Bay pollution, sailing and articles about the Chesapeake Bay and the history of the sailing craft. His first published book, titled The Last Generation: A History of a Chesapeake Shipbuilding Family, is the story of five generations of the Davis family shipwrights, and in particular the M. M. Davis & Company of Solomons Island, Maryland, whose owner Clarence E. Davis built yachts for many designers of the 1920s and 30s, including Philip Rhodes, Charles D. Moyer, John G. Alden, and Sparkman & Stephens. The book contains the photographs of Morris Rosenfeld, Edwin Levick and Robert Knudsen.

Footner's second book, Tidewater Triumph: The Development and Worldwide Success of the Chesapeake Bay Pilot Schooner., concerns a small 18th Century wooden ferry and pilot boat which grew into a family of sailing vessels at the close of the age of commercial wooden sailing vessels, including private armed cruisers and naval brigs and schooners for the American, British, French, Swedish and Danish navies, merchant, slave and opium schooners. Footner relates finding the plans of USS Enterprise at the Arsenal (shipyard) in Venice where it underwent an overhaul in 1805. The book contains illustrations and extensive documentation.

Footner's third book is USS Constellation: From Frigate to Sloop of War, a history of the frigate USS Constellation, including three centuries of operational history, and four major rebuilds of its hull at naval yards. Footner argued that the Constellation of today is essentially the same ship that was launched in Baltimore Harbor in 1797. However, Footner's assertion has been proven false by numerous historical and forensic investigations. In 1991, a thorough investigation involving the navy, the Federal Bureau of Investigation, and the Bureau of Alcohol, Tobacco, and Firearms concluded that Constellation and the original frigate are two different ships and that the documents that had been formerly used to substantiate claims that the frigate and sloop were the same ship had been forged. In 2013, historian C. Herbert Gilliland wrote, "For much of the twentieth century, this ship [1854 sloop of war Constellation] was believed to be the 1797 frigate Constellation. In fact, however, when the 1797 frigate was being dismantled at the Gosport Navy Yard near Norfolk, Virginia, work was beginning on the 1854 sloop, likely reusing some timber from the old ship in building this very new one. The misidentification was maintained by deliberate deception, apparently to enhance the likelihood of the ship's being preserved as a historic relic. Naval records and the evidence from the extant ship's hull, though, make it clear that the vessel floating today dates from 1854."

Footner's A Bungled Affair: Britain’s War on the United States, the Final Years 1814-1815, concentrates on the four theaters of war in the years of 1814 and 1815 in the War of 1812. It follows the growth of Fell's Point, the harbor of the city of Baltimore, into a prominent port and the development of the Chesapeake pilot schooner used by its merchants. He discussed the effect of Britain's maritime policies on the development of America's commercial shipping fleet, as well as a study of Admiral Sir Alexander Cochrane's period as commander-in-chief of the Royal Navy's North American fleet during that period.

== Bibliography ==
- "Changing Times, and the Port: Who Really Needs a 50 Foot Channel". Baltimore Sun. August 8, 1978.
- Footner, Geoffrey (1983). "Towards an Autonomous Bay Authority". Chesapeake Country Life.
- Footner, Geoffrey (1984). "What the Thames Can Teach Us". Baltimore Evening Sun.
- Footner, Geoffrey M. (1991). The Last Generation: A History of a Chesapeake Shipbuilding Family. Solomons, Md.: Calvert Marine Museum Press.
- Footner, Geoffrey M. (1998). Tidewater Triumph: The Development and Worldwide Success of the Chesapeake Bay Pilot Schooner. Mystic Seaport Museum.
- Footner, Geoffrey M. (2003). USS Constellation: from frigate to sloop of war. Annapolis, Md.: Naval Institute Press.
- Footner, Geoffrey M. (2013). A Bungled Affair: Britain's War on the United States, the Final Years, 1814-1815. Baltimore, Md.: Tidewater Book Company.
