= Market Street Historic District (Salem, New Jersey) =

Historic district in New Jersey, United States

- U.S. National Register of Historic Places
- U.S. Historic district
- New Jersey Register of Historic Places
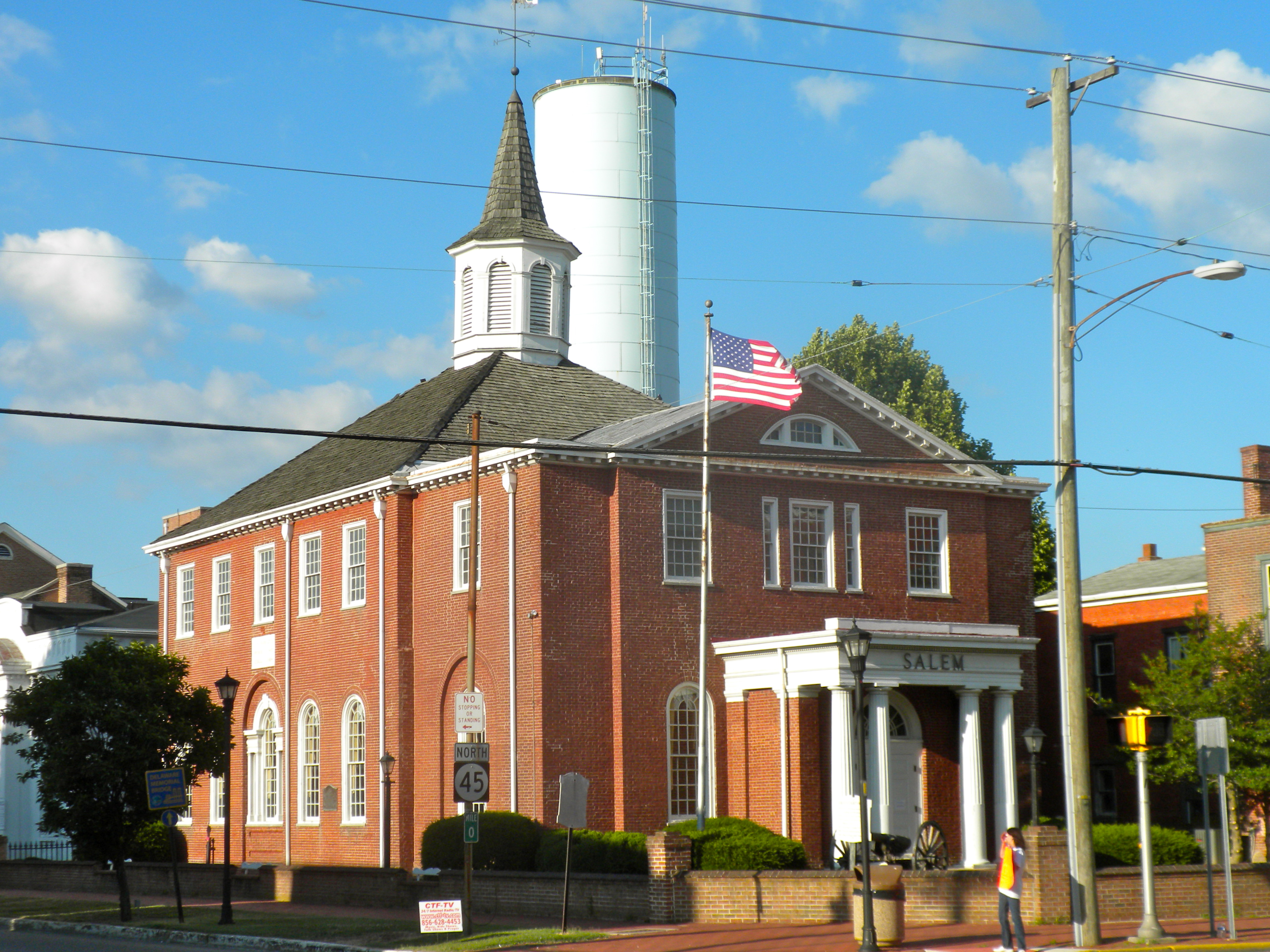
- Old Salem County Courthouse

- Location within Salem County, New Jersey Location within New Jersey Location within the United States
- Location: Irregular pattern on both sides of Market Street from Broadway to Fenwick Creek; Salem, New Jersey
- Coordinates: 39°34′28″N 75°28′0″W
- Area: 77 acres (31 ha)
- Architectural style: Mid 19th Century Revival, Georgian, Federal
- NRHP reference No.: 75001157
- NJRHP No.: 2449

Significant dates
- Added to NRHP: April 10, 1975
- Designated NJRHP: December 9, 1974

The Market Street Historic District is a 166-acre (67 ha) historic district located along Market Street in the downtown area of the city of Salem in Salem County, New Jersey, United States. It was added to the National Register of Historic Places on April 10, 1975, for its significance in architecture, art, commerce, industry, military history, religion, social history, and transportation. The district includes 44 contributing buildings.

== History and description ==
The Old Salem County Courthouse, located at the corner of Broadway and Market streets, was first built in 1735, and later enlarged in 1817 and 1908. It is a 2 1/2 story brick building using Flemish bond and features a cupola and a portico with Doric columns. The Johnson House was built in 1807 by Robert Gibbon Johnson, a gentleman farmer. It was moved from its original site to 90 Market Street in 1966. The 3 story brick Ford's Hotel, also known as the Fenwick Building, at 87 Market Street, features Queen Anne revival style. The First Presbyterian Church was built in 1856 and has a 165-foot (50 m) central spire.

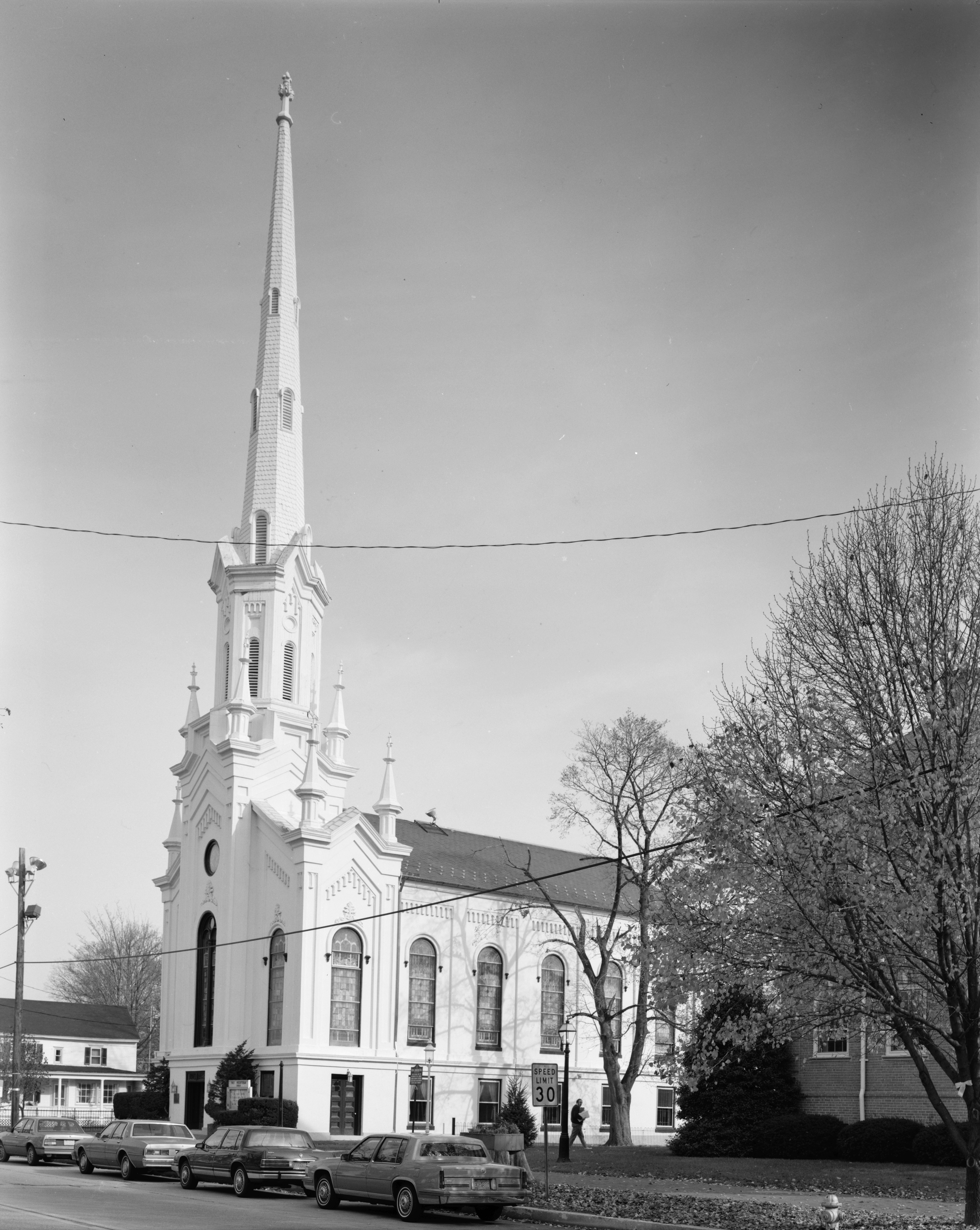
First Presbyterian Church

== See also ==
- National Register of Historic Places listings in Salem County, New Jersey
