= Chard Powers Smith =

American writer (1894–1977)

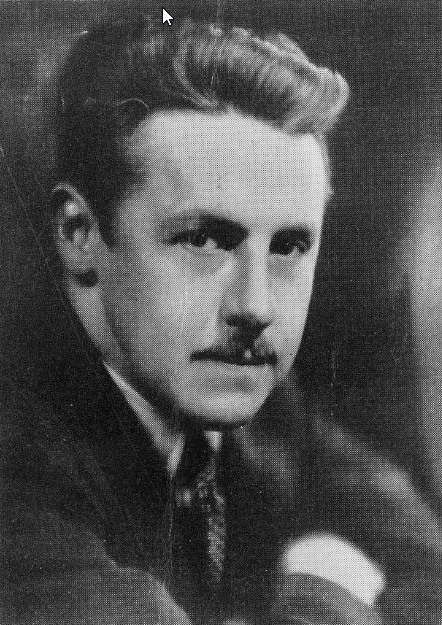
- Born: November 1, 1894 Watertown, U.S.
- Died: October 31, 1977 (aged 82) Williamstown, U.S.
- Notable awards: National Book Award for Fiction ("Bookseller Discovery") in 1939.
- Spouses: Olive Macdonald (m. 1921; died 1924) Marion Antionette Chester (m. 1929; div. 1957) Eunice Waters Clark (m. 1957)

Chard Powers Smith (born Watertown, New York, November 1, 1894; died Williamstown, Massachusetts, October 31, 1977) was an American writer who produced a wide range of works from poetry and fiction to literary criticism and history. His novel Artillery of Time won a National Book Award for Fiction ("Bookseller Discovery") in 1939.

== Early life and education ==
Smith was the son of Edward North Smith (1868–1943), a prominent lawyer and judge, and his wife Alice Lamon Powers (1877–1906), the daughter of a wealthy businessman. His mother died in childbirth when Smith was eleven years old, and his father did not remarry until many years later. Smith attended The Pawling School, Yale for his undergraduate degree (1916), and, after serving as a captain in the field artillery during World War I, Harvard for his law degree (1921). He studied briefly at Oxford University later that year. He did doctoral work at Harvard during the 1920s without receiving a degree. He received an M.A. from Columbia University in 1949.

Smith practiced law in Rochester, New York 1921–2, but quickly moved on to literary pursuits. He moved to Sackets Harbor, New York and maintained a residence in an old mill there for much of his life.

== Career ==
Smith spent much time in the 1920s travelling and living in Europe. Ernest Hemingway's short story "Mr. and Mrs. Elliot", which was originally titled "Mr. and Mrs. Smith," was purported to be inspired by Smith's 1921 marriage to Olive Macdonald (1888?-1924) Smith believed so and was bitter about it for the rest of his life. Olive died of pregnancy-related complications while she and Smith were living in Italy in 1924.

Smith's first book was Along the Wind, a book of poetry published in 1925. From then until the late 1960s Smith produced works on a variety of subjects. His books "Pattern and Variation in Poetry" (1932) and "Annals of the Poets, Their Private Lives and Personalities" (1935) attempted to approach poetry and poets scientifically. Artillery of Time (1939) has been described as a "Gone With the Wind of the North"; its 106 chapters were set in Smith's hometown of Watertown, New York. "The Housatonic: Puritan River" (1946) was part of the Rivers of America Series; it chronicled the history and lore of New England's Housatonic River.

In 1950 Smith provided the text for composer Hubert Klyne Headley's Symphony #2 (Prelude to a Man).

Later works of Smith's include Yankees and God (1954), a history of "Yankee" culture, and Where the Light Falls (1965), a biography of Smith's personal friend poet Edwin Arlington Robinson. He also edited "Poets of the Twenties: 100 Great Poems" (1967).

== Personal life ==
He remarried to Marion Antionette Chester in 1929; she was the granddaughter of long-lived Admiral Colby Mitchell Chester. They lived primarily in Connecticut and had two children together - Chard Powers Smith Jr. (1930–2015) and Marion Kendall Smith (1934-). Chard and Marion Smith divorced in 1957 and Smith married Eunice Waters Clark, a professor of French, in the same year. He spent the last two decades of his life living with her in Arlington, Vermont.

Smith was a supporter of Distributism in the 1930s; he was at a meeting of Distributists and Agrarians in Nashville, Tennessee in 1936 and signed the resulting manifesto.

Smith is buried in Brookside Cemetery in Watertown, New York. His papers are held at Yale University.
