= Harry Hansen (author) =

American historian (1884–1977)

- Born: December 26, 1884; Davenport, Iowa, U.S.
- Died: January 3, 1977 (aged 92)
- Occupations: Journalist, historian, literary critic
- Writing career
- Genres: literature, journalism, history

Harry Hansen (December 26, 1884 – January 3, 1977) was an American journalist, editor, literary critic and historian. He is notable as one of the many authors who wrote for the Random House Landmark Series of children's history during the 1950s and 1960s and he also edited the World Book from 1950 to 1965.

== Life and work ==
Hanson was born in Davenport, Iowa, and attended high school in that same city. After graduation, he joined the Davenport Republican newspaper, serving as both the telegraph editor and a staff writer. He attended the University of Chicago, majoring in English and acquiring his Ph.D. in 1909. After graduation, Hansen joined the Chicago Daily News as a staff reporter and upon the outbreak of the First World War, Hansen became the Daily News' overseas war correspondent in Europe. When the United States entered the war, Hansen was promoted to foreign editor. By 1920, he had risen to the position of Literary Editor and he remained in that position until leaving the Daily News in 1926 to join the New York World as the "First Reader".

Hansen specialized more in literary affairs than in foreign affairs during his time at the World. He made the book review column into a daily feature and remained as book editor even after the World was sold to the New York Telegram in 1931, being one of the very few employees to remain with the paper. Hansen also contributed literary criticism to other newspapers, including the Chicago Tribune, Harper's Magazine and Redbook. His book commentary columns were syndicated in magazines all over the country and Hansen also hosted radio programs both in Chicago and New York. In addition, he served as editor of the O. Henry Prize Stories from 1933 until 1940. He wrote several non-fiction books, including "The Adventures of the Fourteen Points" about the Versailles Peace Conference that ended World War I in 1919 and his only novel, Your Life Lies Before You in 1935.

During and following the Second World War, Hansen continued his historical writing. He wrote one of Farrar & Rinehart's classic Rivers of America series on the Chicago River in 1942 and he also penned one of Random House's equally famous Landmark Series juvenile historical volumes, Old Ironsides, the Fighting Constitution in 1955. In addition, Hansen also served as editor of the World Book from 1950 until 1965. During the 1960s and 1970s, Hansen supervised the revision of several volumes of the American Guide Series of state guidebooks including volumes on Louisiana, California and Illinois, among others. He also published an annual anthology of all the first-prize winners of the O.Henry Memorial Awards and in 1960 he published a complete anthology of the first-prize stories spanning the years from 1919 to 1960.

Hansen was married to Ruth McLernon in 1914, and the couple had two daughters, Ruth Eleanor (born 1915) and Marian (born 1916). Harry Hansen suffered a heart attack and died at the age of 92 on January 3, 1977. Harry Hansen's papers and correspondence are preserved by the Newberry Library in Chicago, Illinois.

== Bibliography ==
=== Novels ===
- Your Life Lies Before You (1935)

=== Literary criticism ===
- Carl Sandburg, the Man and his Poetry (1925)
- Book Show Spring 1931 (1931)
- The Complete Works of O. Henry (1960)
- First-Prize Stories 1919–1960, from the O. Henry Memorial Awards (1960)
- The Pocket Book of O. Henry Stories (1973)

==== History and biography ====
- The Adventures of the Fourteen Points (1919)
- A Peace Congress of Intrigue (Vienna, 1815) (1919)
- Midwest Portraits: A Book of Memories and Friendships (1925)
- The Chicago: Rivers of America Series (1942)
- North of Manhattan Persons and Places of Old Westchester (1950)
- Scarsdale, From Colonial Manor to Modern Community (1954)
- Old Ironsides, the Fighting Constitution (1955)
- The Story of Illinois (1956)
- The Civil War (1961)
- The Boston Massacre: An episode of dissent and violence (1970)
- Longfellow's New England (1972)
- New England Legends and Folklore (1972)

=== State guides ===
- Arizona: The Grand Canyon State (American Guide Series) (1968)
- Texas: A Guide to the Lone Star State (American Guide Series) (1969)
- Colorado: A Guide to the Highest State (American Guide Series) (1970)
- Louisiana a Guide to the State (American Guide Series) (1971)
- California: A Guide to the Golden State (American Guide Series) (1973)
- Illinois: A Descriptive and Historical Guide (American Guide Series) (1974)

=== World books (as editor) ===
- The World Almanac and Book of Facts 1950 (1950)
- The World Almanac and Book of Facts 1951 (1951)
- The World Almanac and Book of Facts 1952 (1952)
- The World Almanac and Book of Facts 1953 (1953)
- The World Almanac and Book of Facts 1954 (1954)
- The World Almanac and Book of Facts 1955 (1955)
- The World Almanac and Book of Facts 1956 (1956)
- The World Almanac and Book of Facts 1957 (1957)
- The World Almanac and Book of Facts 1958 (1958)
- The World Almanac and Book of Facts 1959 (1959)
- The World Almanac and Book of Facts 1960 (1960)
- The World Almanac and Book of Facts 1961 (1961)
- The World Almanac and Book of Facts 1962 (1962)
- The World Almanac and Book of Facts 1963 (1963)
- The World Almanac and Book of Facts 1964 (1964)
- The World Almanac and Book of Facts 1965 (1965)
