= Arthur Tourtellot =

American screenwriter

- Born: Arthur Bernon Tourtellot; July 23, 1913
- Died: October 1977
- Occupation: Writer

Arthur Bernon Tourtellot (July 23, 1913 – October 1977) was an American writer, screenwriter and producer best known for the book Lexington and Concord.

== History ==
Arthur Bernon Tourtellot was born July 23, 1913. He was a fellow at Middlebury College in 1938 and was at a writer's conference at the Bread Loaf Campus in 1941. He served in the U.S. Coast Guard during World War II.

At the end of the war he served as the associate producer of two March of Time documentaries. The first, Crusade in Europe, was based on Dwight D. Eisenhower's book of the same name. He died in October 1977.

== Partial bibliography ==
=== Non-fiction ===
- Be Loved No More the Life and Environment of Fanny Burney (Houghton Mifflin Co Boston, 1938)
- The Charles (Farrar & Rinehart, New York, 1941) (14th volume in the Rivers of America Series)
- Selections for Today by Woodrow Wilson (Editor) (Duell, Sloan & Pearce, 1945)
- Life’s Picture History of World War II (Editor) (Time, Inc., New York, 1950)
- An Anatomy of American Politics; Innovation Versus Conservatism (Bobbs-Merrill Company, Indianapolis, IN, 1950)
- Lexington and Concord (W. W. Norton & Co, New York, 1959)
- William Diamond's Drum: the Beginning of the War of the American Revolution (Doubleday & Co., Garden City, NY, 1959)
- Biography of William S. Paley, (unpublished manuscript, 1961–1967, Archives of Doubleday & Co., Garden City, NY)
- Toward the Well-Being of Mankind, 50 Years of the Rockefeller Foundation (Editor) (Doubleday & Co., Garden City, NY, 1964 and Hutchinson, London, 1964)
- The Presidents on the Presidency (Doubleday & Co., Garden City, NY, 1964)
- The Lost Revolution: The Story of Twenty Years of Neglected Opportunities in Vietnam and of America's Failure to Foster Democracy There (Editor) (Harper & Row, New York, 1965)
- Benjamin Franklin: The Shaping of Genius, the Boston Years (Doubleday & Co., Garden City, NY, 1977)]

=== Associate producer ===
- Crusade in Europe (Volumes 1 through 3) (March of Time, 1951)

=== Producer ===
- Crusade in the Pacific (Volumes 1 through 5) (March of Time, 1951)

=== Screenwriter ===
- The Guns of August (Universal, 1964) (wrote narration)

=== Articles ===
- "History and the Historical Novel Where Fact and Fantasy Meet and Part", (Saturday Review, XII, August 24, 1940)
- "Dilemma of a People Adrift", (Saturday Review, March 6, 1965)
- "The Early Reading of Benjamin Franklin" (Harvard Library Bulletin, Cambridge, MA, 1975)
- "Rebels, turn out your dead!—" (American Heritage Magazine, August 1970 Volume 21, Issue 5)
