= Theresa Sherrer Davidson =

American artist (1893–1986)

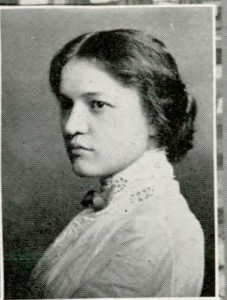
- Born: October 12, 1893; Marion
- Died: September 23, 1986 (aged 92); Nashville
- Occupation: Artist, lawyer, classical scholar
- Spouse(s): Donald Davidson

Theresa Julienna Sherrer Davidson (October 12, 1893 – September 23, 1986) was an American classicist, lawyer, law librarian, and artist.

Theresa Sherrer Davidson was born on October 12, 1893 in Marion, Ohio, the daughter of Frederick Anthony and Mary Alge Sherrer. She studied at Western Reserve University from 1910-1912 and graduated from Oberlin College with a B.A. in 1914 and an M.A. in 1915, graduating Phi Beta Kappa with majors in mathematics and classics. She taught both subjects at Martin College in Pulaski, Tennessee from 1915 to 1917. While there, she met Donald Davidson, a Vanderbilt University student who would become a leading southern literary figure - a founder of both The Agrarians and The Fugitives - and an ardent southern regionalist, racist, and pro-segregationist. They married in 1918.

Theresa Davidson received a Bachelor of Laws degree from Vanderbilt in 1922, and was admitted to the Tennessee bar. She taught at Ward Belmont from 1923 to 1924 and was law librarian at the Vanderbilt University Law Library from 1924 to 1929. She began doctoral studies in classics at Vanderbilt under Clyde Pharr, with a focus on Roman law. They collaborated on the first translation of the Codex Theodosianus into English, with Davidson translating the first book of the Codex as her doctoral thesis. She graduated with a PhD in 1943. Davidson lectured on classics at Vanderbilt from 1942-1949. Pharr and Davidson had a falling-out over credit for the Codex project, and Davidson took legal action. Davidson was credited as associate editor when the Codex was published by Princeton University Press.

Davidson studied at the Cleveland School of Art in the early 1910s and under Nashville artist Leora Pearl Saunders in the 1930s. Davidson created woodcut illustrations for some of her husband's books: The Tennessee (1946 and 1948), a two volume part of the Rivers of America Series, Still Rebels, Still Yankees (1957), and The Long Street (1961). The illustrations were favorably received by book critics.

In 1957, Davidson was one of seventeen lawyers who defended sixteen defendants accused of violating an injunction by judge Robert L. Taylor prohibiting interference with the integration of Clinton High School in Clinton, Tennessee. The school was the subject of violent anti-desegregation protests and was the target of a terrorist bombing in 1958.

Theresa Sherrer Davidson died on 23 September 1986 in Nashville.
