= Michele Felice Cornè =

American painter (1752–1845)

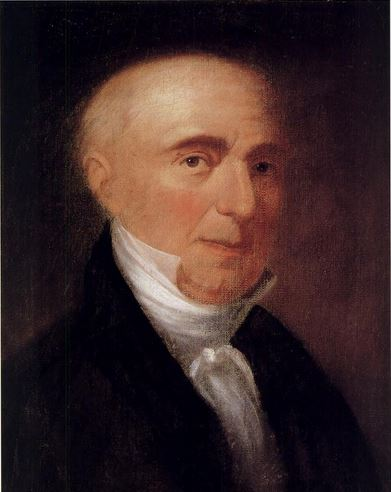
- Michele Felice Cornè
- Born: September 1752; Elba
- Died: 10 July 1845; Newport, Rhode Island

Michele Felice Cornè (1752–1845) was an artist born in Elba who settled in the United States. He lived in Salem and Boston, Massachusetts; and in Newport, Rhode Island. He painted marine scenes, portraits, and interior decorations such as fireboards and murals.

== Biography ==
Cornè grew up in Naples. Drafted by the Neapolitan army to help repel the brief French occupation of Naples in 1799, he fled and was brought to the United States on the ship Mount Vernon, commanded by Elias Hasket Derby Jr., and settled in Salem, Massachusetts in 1800. After his arrival, Cornè lived at Captain Derby's house, which the latter had inherited from the recent death of his father. The location of the mansion remains, but the home was torn down in 1815. On that spot is Old Town Hall which was designed by Charles Bulfinch and dedicated by President James Monroe in 1816, on his New England tour to keep the country together after the Hartford Convention which was organized by Timothy Pickering and his Essex Junto. Cornè moved to Boston in 1807 and lived and worked there until 1822.

In 1806, he created a large "panorama" or panoramic painting, 10 feet high by 60 feet long, of the Bombardment of Tripoli, commemorating American victory in the First Barbary War (1801-1805). (This panoramic version may have been adapted from a smaller (81 x 122 cm) oil painting in the collection of the Maine Historical Society.) The work was exhibited in December 1806 at the Concert Hall in Boston, after which it traveled to Portsmouth, N.H. and Portland, Maine. It was later displayed as a part of a larger Panorama of the Battle of Bunker Hill exhibition at Washington Hall in Salem.

In 1810, he painted the wall murals at the Sullivan Dorr house in Providence, Rhode Island. After the historic battle of USS Constitution vs HMS Guerriere on August 19, 1812, Cornè created a series of four paintings showing four key events in the battle. All four paintings are in the collection of the Peabody Essex Museum, Salem, MA.

In 1822, Cornè relocated to Newport, Rhode Island. His house in Newport still stands on Cornè Street. He lived there until his death in 1845, at the age of 93. He was buried in the Common Burial Ground in Newport.

== Legacy ==
Examples of his work are in the collections of Historic New England; Museum of Fine Arts, Boston; Peabody Essex Museum; Redwood Library and Athenaeum; and U.S. Naval Academy Museum. Interior murals painted by Cornè survive in the Sullivan Dorr house, Providence, Rhode Island. One of his students was the noted maritime artist George Ropes.

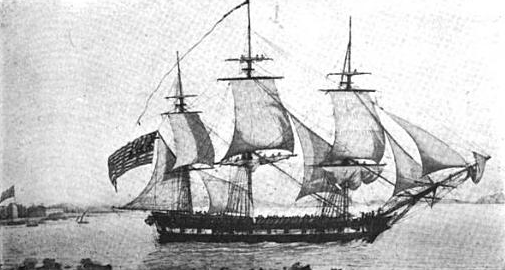
1799

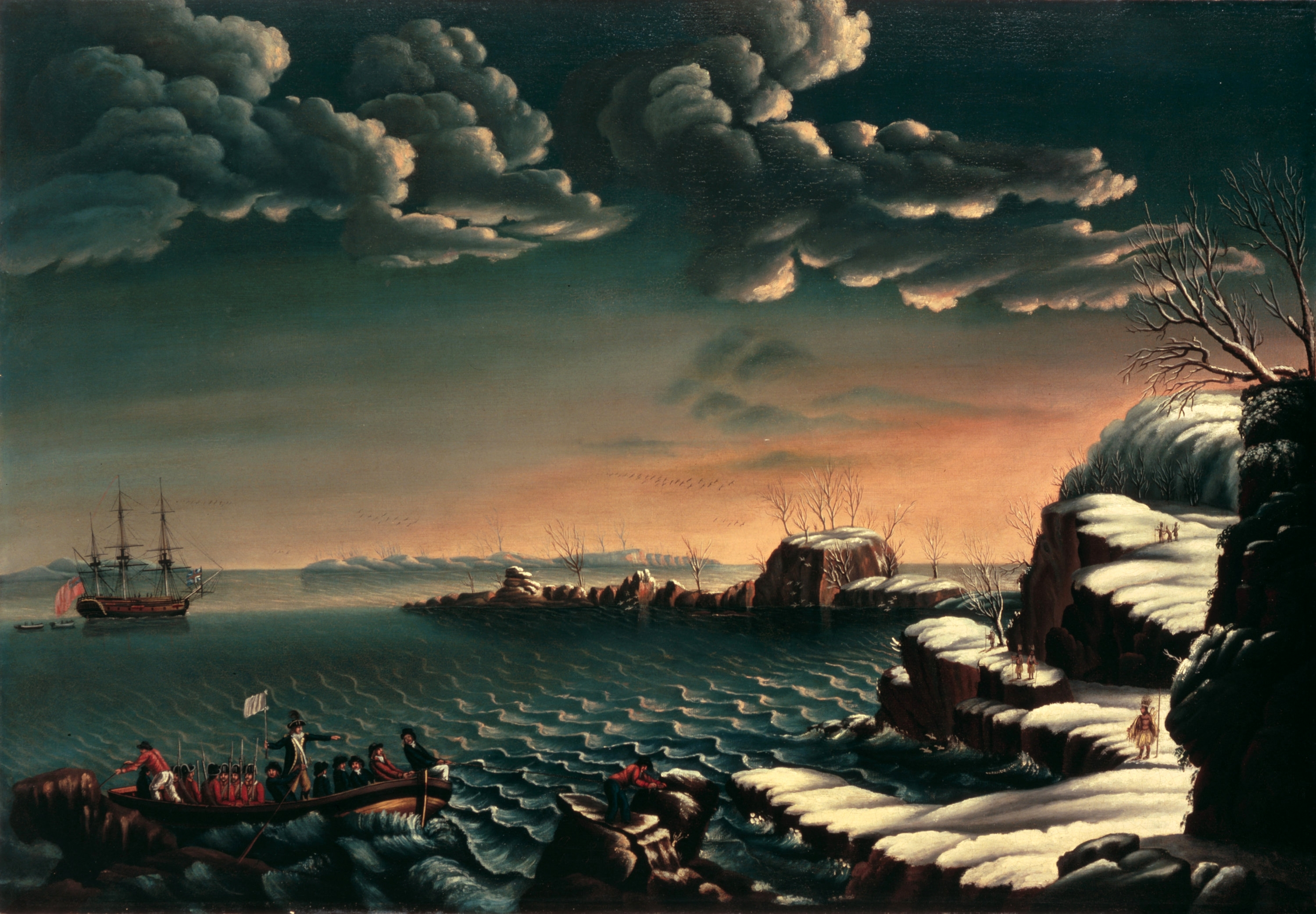
Landing of the Pilgrims, ca.1805

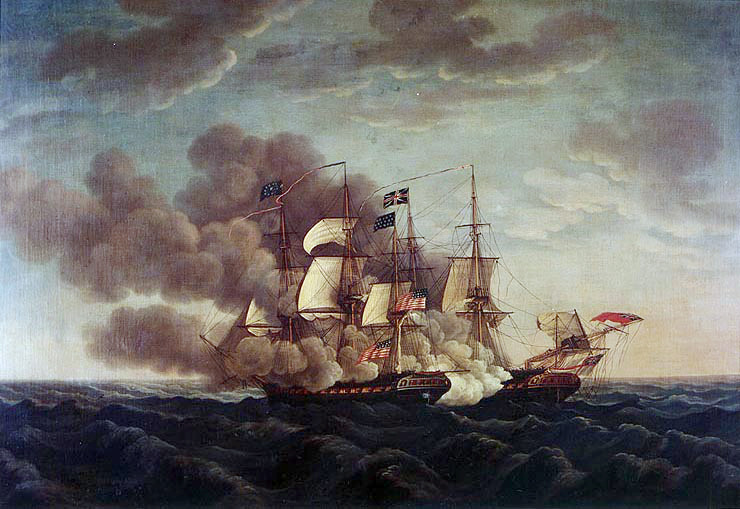

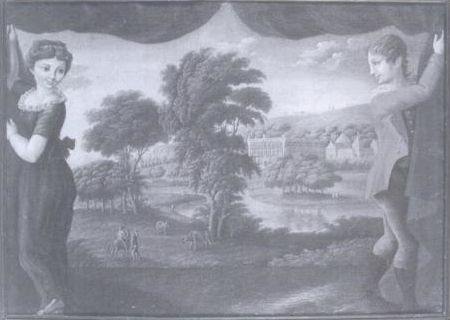

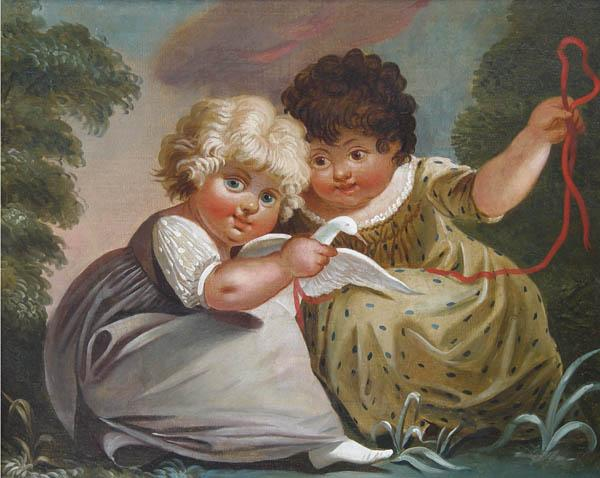

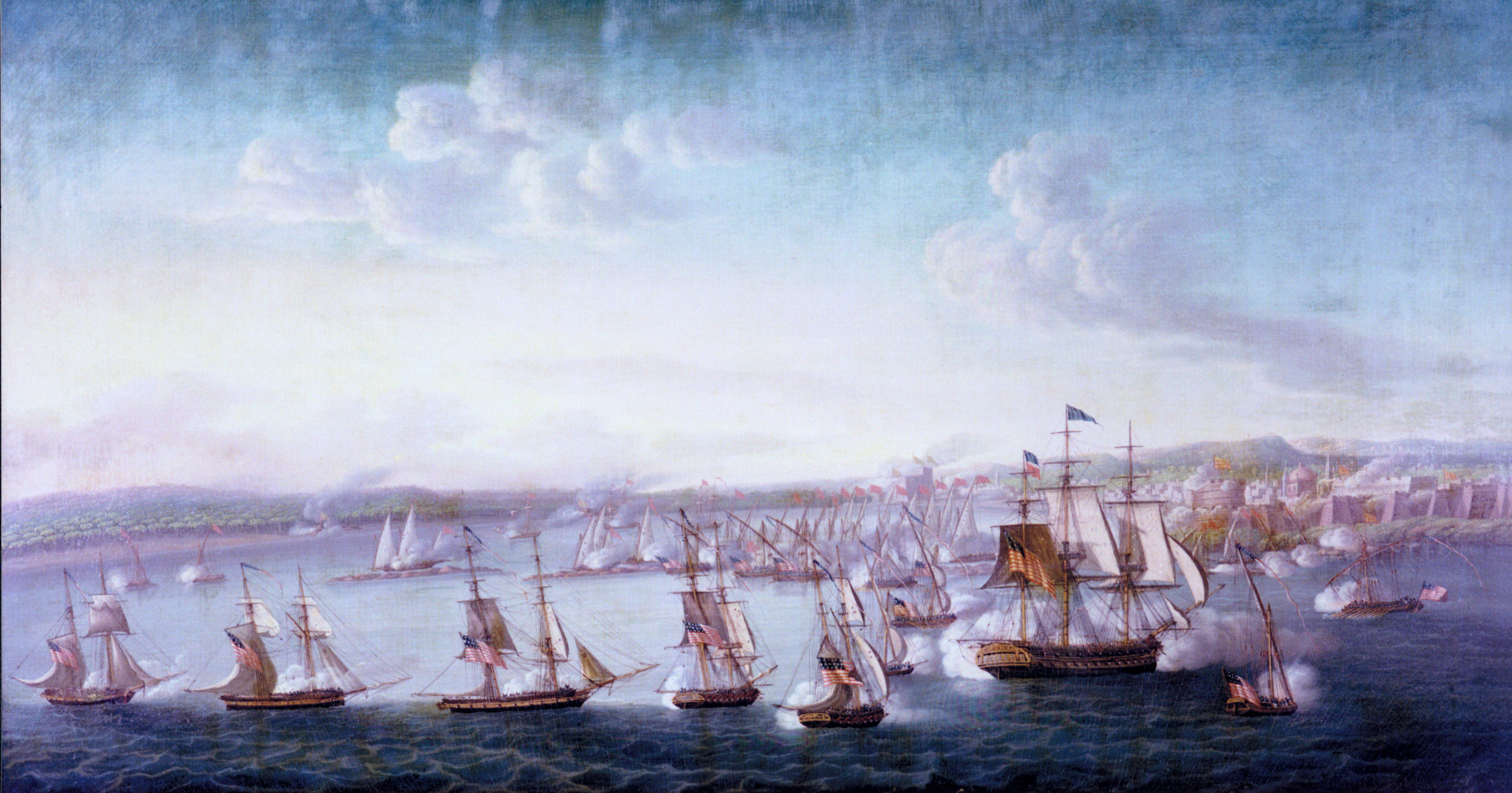

== Cornè and tomatoes ==
It is reputed that Cornè introduced the tomato into the American diet. In early 19th century New England tomatoes were thought to be deadly poison. Cornè was accustomed to eating tomatoes in his native land and would regularly eat them without ill effect and, thus, allayed the fears of the residents of his adopted country.

The tomato is native to western South America, and was formally cultivated by the Aztecs and other peoples in Mesoamerica.

== See also ==
- Robert Gibbon Johnson, another early American advocate of eating tomatoes
