= Floyd Benjamin Streeter =

American historian

Floyd Benjamin Streeter (1888–1956) was an American historian and writer. He is best known for his biography of Ben Thompson.

Streeter was a historian and librarian of Hays City Kansas State College (now Fort Hays State University) and worked as an archivist for the Michigan Historical Commission for whom he assembled a 750+ page Michigan bibliography listing over 7000 books and pamphlets, published in 1921.

Streeter wrote a number of books on topics related to the Old West for children and adults. Streeter conducted research that discredited Wyatt Earp’s claim to have arrested Ben Thompson in Ellsworth, Kansas on August 15, 1873.

== Works ==
Books:

- Political Parties in Michigan (University Series IV, Michigan Historical Publications 1918)
- Michigan Bibliography: A Partial Catalogue of Books, Maps, Manuscripts and Miscellaneous Materials Relating to the Resources, Development and History of Michigan from Earliest Times to July 1, 1917: Together with Citation of Libraries in which the Materials May Be Consulted, and a Complete Analytical Index By Subject and Author. (Lansing, Michigan Historical Commission, 1921. 2 volumes)
- Journal in America 1837-1838 by Joshua Toulmin Smith Edited with Introduction and Notes by Floyd Benjamin Streeter. (Charles F. Heartman, Metuchen, NJ, 1925)
- Prairie Trails & Cow Towns: The Opening of the Old West, (Chapman & Grimes, Boston, 1936)
- Longhorns, Shorthorns; The Life and Times of Captain Eugene Bartlett Millett, a Cattleman of the Old West, (manuscript, 1940's, University of Kansas)
- The Kaw: Heart of the Nation (Farrar and Rinehart, New York, 1941) (The 12th volume in the Rivers of America Series)
- The Kansas Library Association' (1953)
- The Phantom Steer (Ariel Books, New York, 1953)
- Ben Thompson: Man with a Gun (F. Fell, New York 1957)

Articles:

- The Millett Cattle Ranch in Baylor County, Texas, Panhandle-Plains Historical Review 22 (1949)
- Some Eastern Newspaper Men Who Wrote Books on the Kansas Territory, American Book Collector: A Monthly Magazine for Book Lovers, Vol. IV, Number 5, November, 1933.
