= Aaron Sopher =

American painter

Aaron Sopher (1905–1972) was an American artist who is known for his depictions of Baltimore, United States.

== Early life and education ==
Aaron Sopher, the tenth of the thirteen children of Samuel A. Sopher and Jennie Saperstein, was born in East Baltimore, Maryland, on December 16, 1905. His father owned a small cigar factory and tobacco shop near the Baltimore harbor. Sopher attended Maryland Institute of Fine and Applied Arts, now known as the Maryland Institute College of Art, where he trained with Alon Bement, the director of the institution. When a new director replaced Bement, Aaron Sopher was not awarded his diploma in 1925 due to his frequent absences and lack of discipline.

== Work ==
Following his stint at the Maryland Institute of Fine and Applied Arts, Sopher worked as a freelance illustrator for The Baltimore Sun, where his drawings began to appear regularly. In 1927, he received his first large commission from the newspaper to illustrate a story about the Baltimore waterfront, which was the first illustration to bring him wide recognition. Sopher then moved to New York City in 1929 where he resided until 1931. His cartoons appeared in The New Yorker, and his sketches of week were often included in The New Masses, a leftist publication devoted to social commentary.

During the Depression, Sopher portrayed the devastation faced by the American people. Several of his ink drawings and watercolors from this period were done under the auspices of Writers Sapos, a program for public works projects administered in Maryland.

== Publication and exhibition ==
Sopher's work appeared in prominent magazines and newspapers such as Harper's Magazine, Johns Hopkins Magazine (pub. Johns Hopkins University), The Wall Street Journal, The New Yorker, and Vanity Fair. Sopher's drawings and watercolors have been featured in exhibitions at Maryland Institute College of Art, Carnegie Institute, Corcoran Gallery of Art, Art Institute of Chicago, San Francisco Museum of Art, Denver Art Museum, Library of Congress, and New York Public Library. During his career, he was supported by many Baltimore and Washington, D.C., institutions such as the Corcoran, the Peale Museum, and the Baltimore Museum of Art.
