= Harry Emerson Wildes =

Harry Emerson Wildes (April 3, 1890 in Philadelphia, Pennsylvania – 1982) an American sociologist, historian and writer who is best known for his biographies of William Penn, George Fox and Anthony Wayne.

== History ==
Born April 3, 1890, Wildes received an undergraduate degree from Harvard University in 1913, taught in Japan before 1927, and received his PhD in Sociology from the University of Pennsylvania in 1927.

During the Second World War, Wildes served in the Pacific as a political advisor to the Supreme Commander for the Allied Powers (SCAP). Wildes was among those who drafted a Constitution for Japan after the Second World War under orders from General Douglas MacArthur. Wildes served on the Civil Rights Committee which utilized the precepts of the U.S Declaration of Independence, the French Declaration of the Rights of Man and of the Citizen of 1789, the Soviet Constitution of 1918, and the Weimar Constitution of 1919 to create a strong Bill of Rights for the Japanese Constitution.

Wildes left SCAP in frustration in late 1946 and wrote an exposé for the American Political Science Review charging the new political parties being formed in Japan had all the attributes of hooligan gangs.

Wildes died in February 1982. Some of his papers are at Syracuse University

== Partial bibliography ==
Non-Fiction

Social Currents in Japan (University of Chicago Press, Chicago, 1927)

Japan in Crisis (Macmillan, New York, 1934)

Aliens in the East (University of Pennsylvania Press, Philadelphia, 1937)

Valley Forge (Macmillan, New York, 1938)

The Delaware (Farrar & Rinehart, New York, 1940) (The 10th volume in the Rivers of America Series)

Anthony Wayne: Trouble Shooter of the American Revolution (Harcourt & Brace, New York, 1941)

Lonely Midas: The Story of Steven Girard (Farrar & Rinehart, New York, 1943)

Twin Rivers: The Raritan and the Passaic (Farrar & Rinehart, New York, 1943) (The 23rd volume in the Rivers of America Series)

Voice of the Lord: A Biography of George Fox (University of Pennsylvania Press Philadelphia 1965)

William Penn (Macmillan, New York, 1974)

Typhoon in Tokyo: The Occupation and Its Aftermath (MacMillan, 1954)

Articles

Press Freedom in Japan (American Journal of Sociology, volume 32, page 601, 1927)

Review of Foster Rhea Dulles: Forty Years of American-Japanese Relations. (Annals of the American Academy of Political and Social Science 1938 195: 242-243)

Intellectual Progress in the East (Annals of the American Academy of Political and Social Science.1958; 318: 27-33)

The American Occupation of Japan: A Retrospective View (Contributed a commentary) (Center for East Asian Studies, University of Kansas, 1968)

== Sources ==
Constitution of Japan

Author Anniversaries

Special Collections, Syracuse University

Center for East Asian Studies

American Book Exchange
