= Frederick Roberts Rinehart =

Frederick Roberts Rinehart (1902–1981) was an American book publisher. Rinehart was a son of mystery writer Mary Roberts Rinehart, a brother of publisher Stanley Rinehart, Jr., and a brother of producer and playwright Alan Rinehart.

== Early life, education, and career launch ==
Rinehart was born on 14 September 1902 in Allegheny, Pennsylvania, which has since merged with Pittsburgh. He graduated from the Morristown School in Morristown, NJ (now Morristown-Beard School) in 1920. Rinehart then completed his bachelor's degree at Harvard University in 1924. Rinehart began his career in publishing as a worker in the shipping room at George H. Doran. He later served as a book salesman for the company.

== Farrar and Rinehart ==
In 1929, Rinehart co-founded the publishing house Farrar & Rinehart with Stanley Rinehart and John C. Farrar. Rinehart then served as a vice president. In just a few weeks, Rinehart and his associates began announcing a slate of upcoming publications:

- Myron Brinig's Singermann
- Paxton Hibben's The Peerless Leader: William Jennings Bryan
- Du Bose Heyward's Half-Print Flask
- Jacob Zeitlin and Homer Woodbridge's Life and Letters of Stuart P. Sherman
- Herbert Gorman's The Incredible Marquis: Alexandre Dumas
- Mary Roberts Rinehart's The Romantics

Under the leadership of Rinehart and his colleagues, Farrar & Rinehart achieved notoriety for publishing the works of Hervey Allen, Katherine Brush, and Mary Roberts Rinehart. The company also achieved recognition as one of the first publishers of dollar fiction. After Farrar & Rinehart acquired the Cosmopolitan Book Corporation from William Randolph Hearst in 1931, the company began a new division to publish college textbooks. Publishers Weekly awarded Farrar & Rinehart its first Carey–Thomas Award in 1943 for its publication of the Rivers of America Series by literary figures.

== Rinehart & Co ==
After Farrar left to start Farrar & Straus (now Farrar, Straus and Giroux in 1946, Farrar & Rinehart changed its name to Rinehart & Company. The new name reflected joint corporate leadership of Rinehart and Frederick Rinehart. Rinehart served as the vice president and Stanley Rinehart served as the president.

Rinehart & Company achieved recognition for publishing the first books in Charles Schulz's Peanuts series, as well as works by Faith Baldwin, Stephen Vincent Benét, Norman Mailer, and Erich Fromm. In 1953, the company published The Wonderful World of Insects as the first book printed by the Photon (known as the Lumitype in France), a photographic type composing machine invented by René Alphonse Higonnet and Louis Moyroud. The Photon machine, known as the Lumitype in France, used a photoengraving process to print text and images on paper, which made hotel metal typesetting obsolete.

Seven years later, Rinehart & Company merged with Henry Holt and Company and John C. Winston Co. to form Holt, Rinehart, and Winston (now the Holt McDougal Division of Houghton Mifflin Harcourt). Rinehart served as a vice president at the new company before retiring from publishing in 1963.

== Publications ==
In 2003 Rinehart selected and introduced the book Chronicles of Colorado.

== Philanthropy ==
Rinehart served as President of the Mary Roberts Rinehart Fund. Incorporated in 1958 the foundation provides grants and editorial advice to promising writers. It also annually awards the Mary Roberts Rinehart Award to a woman writer of non-fiction.

== Family ==
Rinehart married Elizabeth Sherwood from Geneva, NY. They had one child, Cornelia.
