= Stanley Rinehart Jr. =

American book publisher

Stanley Marshall Rinehart Jr. (1897–1969) was an American book publisher. He was the son of mystery writer Mary Roberts Rinehart, the brother of publisher Frederick Roberts Rinehart, and the brother of producer and playwright Alan Rinehart.

== Early life, education, and career launch ==
Rinehart was born on August 18, 1897, in Allegheny, Pennsylvania, which has since merged with Pittsburgh, Pennsylvania. After studying at Shady Side Academy in Pittsburgh, he graduated from the Morristown School in Morristown, New Jersey (now Morristown-Beard School) in 1915. Rinehart then studied at Harvard University before leaving school to serve in the U.S. Army during World War I. During his days at Harvard, Rinehart served on the Editorial Board of the Harvard Lampoon, a humor magazine. Following his war service, Rinehart began a career in publishing as a worker in the advertising department at George H. Doran. After taking on the position of advertising manager, he also served as the company's secretary and as a member of its board of trustees.

== Farrar & Rinehart ==
In 1929, Rinehart co-founded the publishing house Farrar & Rinehart with Frederick Rinehart and John C. Farrar. Rinehart then served as the company's founding president. In just a few weeks, Rinehart and his associates began announcing a slate of upcoming publications:

- Myron Brinig's Singermann
- Paxton Hibben's The Peerless Leader: William Jennings Bryan
- Du Bose Heyward's Half-Print Flask
- Jacob Zeitlin and Homer Woodbridge's Life and Letters of Stuart P. Sherman
- Herbert Gorman's The Incredible Marquis: Alexandre Dumas
- Mary Roberts Rinehart's The Romantics

Under the leadership of Rinehart and his colleagues, Farrar & Rinehart achieved notoriety for publishing the works of Hervey Allen, Katherine Brush, and Mary Roberts Rinehart. The company also achieved recognition as one of the first publishers of dollar fiction. After Farrar & Rinehart acquired the Cosmopolitan Book Corporation from William Randolph Hearst in 1931, the company began to publish college textbooks. In 1943, Publishers Weekly awarded Farrar & Rinehart its first Carey–Thomas Award for publication of the Rivers of America Series by literary figures.

== Rinehart & Co ==
After Farrar left to start Farrar & Straus (now Farrar, Straus, and Giroux) in 1946, Farrar & Rinehart changed its name to Rinehart & Company. The new name reflected joint corporate leadership of Rinehart and Frederick Rinehart. During this period, Rinehart & Company achieved recognition for publishing the first books in Charles Schulz's Peanuts series, as well as works by Faith Baldwin, Stephen Vincent Benét, Norman Mailer, and Erich Fromm. In 1953, the company published The Wonderful World of Insects as the first book printed by the Photon (known as the Lumitype in France), a photographic type composing machine invented by René Alphonse Higonnet and Louis Moyroud. The Photon machine used a photoengraving process to print text and images on paper, which made hot metal typesetting obsolete.

Seven years later, Rinehart & Company merged with Henry Holt and Company and John C. Winston Co. to form Holt, Rinehart, and Winston (now the Holt McDougal Division of Houghton Mifflin Harcourt). Holt, Rinehart, and Winston named Rinehart and Charles F. Kindt Jr. (president of Winston) as the company's senior vice presidents. Rinehart served in that role until retiring in 1963. During his career, he also served as a president of the National Association of Book Publishers.

== Military service ==
Rinehart enlisted in the U.S. Army as a private. Rising to the rank of lieutenant, he trained troops in the tactics of trench warfare. Rinehart later requested a transfer to the front lines to see his mother, who then worked as a wartime correspondent for The Saturday Evening Post.

== Rescuing motorists on Bronx River Parkway ==
On April 1, 1940, Rinehart rescued two individuals from a dangerous driving situation on the Bronx River Parkway. A defective muffler in the car of Fred Lindsey and his wife had begun leaking carbon monoxide fumes during their drive from Scotia, New York. After the fumes knocked Lindsey semi-unconscious and his wife fully unconscious, their car began swerving from one side of the Parkway to the other, and it narrowly missed several head-on collisions. Risking a collision himself by driving alongside, Rinehart shouted to Lindsey to turn off the car ignition and steer the car toward the grass shoulder. The shouting aroused Lindsey from his semi-conscious state, which enabled him to do the actions requested by Rinehart. Running to the now halted car, Rinehart pulled Lindsey and his wife to the safety of fresh air. The New York State Police later drove them to Ossining Hospital.

== Family ==
Rinehart married Mary Noble Doran on June 24, 1919. After they divorced, he married Frances Alice Yeatman. Rinehart had three children: George, Stanley III, and Mary.
