= Alan Marshall (historian) =

British historian

Alan Marshall (born 30 April 1949, Kilmarnock, Scotland) is a British historian who works in France. He specialises in the history of printing, in particular that of phototypesetting.

== Biography ==
After studying maths and physics at Glasgow University, he became a founder member of Aberdeen People's Press (APP), which published a fortnightly alternative newspaper from 1973 until 1976. The press also provided a printing service to political organisations, activist groups, trade unions and charities in Scotland. Beginning in 1976, it began to published books and pamphlets on workers' and alternative movements. APP became a workers' coop in 1979.

Marshall moved to France in 1981, and in 1989 began working with the Musée de l'imprimerie in Lyons, cataloguing its documentation and research library. He also worked with the Association pour un conservatoire de l'informatique et de la télématique (Aconit), making contributions to two exhibitions: La lettre et l'ordinateur and Histoires de mémoires. In 1991, he obtained a PhD in history from Pierre Mendès-France University (Grenoble) for a study of the invention and commercialisation of the first second-generation phototypesetting machine, the Lumitype-Photon. He curated or co-curated several exhibitions for the Musée de l’imprimerie (Impressions de Marius Audin. Un imprimeur-érudit de l’entre-deux-guerres, 1995; Ephemera: les imprimés de tous les jours, 2001; Imprimer sur tissu et sur papier au fil des siècles, 2005; Transatlantiques. L'épopée graphique des paquebots de légende, 2013), as well as for the Museum of the French Revolution (L'affiche en révolution). From 1999 until 2002 he worked for the École nationale supérieure des sciences de l'information et des bibliothèques (Enssib) on setting up the Institut d'histoire du livre. He was in charge of the Book History Workshop (École de l’Institut d’histoire du livre) until 2009 and remained a member of its board until 2015.

Marshall has published numerous articles and several books on the history of printing and graphic communication. From 1997 until 2011 he contributed to the Dictionnaire encyclopédique du livre, for which he was also in charge of the English terminology.

He was historical advisor to the Musée de l'imprimerie from 1992 until 2002 when he was appointed as its director. During his time as director, the Musée acquired the status of Musée de France (2005). He directed the Musée until his retirement in 2015. During his time as director, he supervised the restructuring of the Musée in order to improve the use of the building and more fully exploit its rich collections, as reflected in the new identity: Musée de l'imprimerie et de la communication graphique. He has been chair of the Association of European Printing Museums since 2012.

== Honours ==
In 2011, he was made chevalier of the Ordre des Arts et des Lettres

== Publications ==
- Changing the word: the printing industry in transition, London, Comedia publishing group, 1983
- Introduction to and annotation of Pierre Cuchet's, Études sur les machines à composer et l'esthétique du livre, (originally published in 1908), Montbonnot-Saint-Martin, Jérôme Millon, « Verso », 1986
- Savoir-faire typographique et changement technologique, Grenoble, Institut de recherche économique sur la production et le développement, 1988
- Ruptures et continuités dans un changement de système technique: le remplacement du plomb par la lumière dans la composition typographique, Rennes, Institut de recherche en informatique et systèmes aléatoires (INRIA), 1992
- 'Marius Audin, Stanley Morison et la publication des Livrets typographiques et de la Bibliographie des de Tournes', in Bulletin du bibliophile, Paris, Editions du Cercle de la librairie, 1994.
- La Lumitype-Photon: René Higonnet, Louis Moyroud et l'invention de la photocomposition moderne, proceedings of the conference organised by the Musée de l'imprimerie et de la banque, in Lyon, 20–21 October 1994, edited by A. Marshall, Lyon, Musée de l'imprimerie et de la banque, 1995
- 'La gravure sur bois et ses techniques dans la presse illustrée de la fin du XIXe siècle', in Du fusil au brancard, Genève, Musée international de la Croix-rouge et du Croissant-rouge, 1997
- 'Fantaisies postmodernes ou l'Imprimerie artistique revisitée', in Gutenberg-Jahrbuch, edited by Stefan Füssel, Mainz, Gutenberg-Gesellschaft, 1997, p. 219-232
- 'Decay and renewal in typeface markets. Variations on a typographical theme', in Emigre, no 42, Sacramento, 1997
- 'New approaches to the study of 20th-century typographical production', in Gutenberg-Jahrbuch, edited by Stefan Füssel, Mainz, Gutenberg-Gesellschaft, 1998, p. 256-264
- 'Les mutations de la chaîne graphique au XXe siècle', in Revue française d'histoire du livre, Bordeaux and Geneva, Société des bibliophiles de Guyenne, 2000
- 'La dématérialisation de la chaîne graphique', in Les trois révolutions du livre, Paris, Imprimerie nationale, 2002
- Du plomb à la lumière: la Lumitype-Photon et la naissance des industries graphiques modernes, preface by Henri-Jean Martin, Paris, Éditions de la Maison des sciences de l'homme, 2003
- 'Beyond the old books/new technology dichotomy: rethinking 20th century printing history', in Proceedings. First international conference on typography and visual communication, Thessaloniki, University of Macedonia Press, 2004
- 'La démocratisation de la typographie', in Ink, no 3, Lyons, 2008
- 'Learning to live with the 20th century: printing museums in the wake of the digital revolution', proceedings of the AEPM annual conference 2008. Retrieved 16 January 2018
- Histoire de l'imprimé, co-written with Sheza Moledina, with the collaboration of Hélène-Sybille Beltran and Bernadette Moglia, Lyons, Éditions Media conseil communication, 2008
- 'Lyons Printing Museum: coming to terms with printed ephemera', in Ephemera News, Cazenovia, New York, The Ephemera Society of America, 2010
- 'Lyons Printing Museum', in Gutenberg-Jahrbuch, Mayence, Gutenberg Gesellschaft, 2013
- 'Pour une histoire des techniques graphiques du XXe siècle', in 50 ans d’histoire du livre, edited by Dominique Varry, Lyons, Presses de l’Enssib, 2014.
- 'Musées du livre à l'heure du numérique', in Le livre, la photographie, l'image et la lettre. Essays in honour of André Jammes, Paris, Éditions des Cendres, 2015
- 'Les Musées de l'imprimerie à l'aune de la communication graphique', in Identité et différence. Imprimerie d'Occident et d'Orient, proceedings of the conference hosted by the Musée de l'estampe et du dessin original, Gravelines, 30-31 octobre 2015
