= Higonnet =

Higonnet is a French surname. Notable people with the surname include:

- Anne Higonnet (born 1958 or 1959), American art historian
- Margaret Higonnet (born 1941), American author and historian
- Patrice Higonnet (born 1938), French author and historian
- René Alphonse Higonnet (1902–1983), French engineer and inventor

== See also ==
- Charles Higounet (1911–1988), French medievalist
- Philippe Higonet (1782–1859), French general and politician
