= Hibben =

Hibben is a surname. Notable people with the surname include:

- Frank C. Hibben (1910–2002), American archaeologist
- Gil Hibben (born 1935), American knife maker
- Helene Hibben (1882–1969), American artist
- John Grier Hibben (1861–1933), American Presbyterian minister, philosopher and educator
- Paxton Hibben (1880–1928), American diplomat, journalist, writer and humanitarian
- Samuel Hibben (1888–1972), American lighting designer
- Sheila Hibben (1888–1964), American food writer
