= Sylvia Wright =

American author (1917–1981)

- Born: 21 January 1917; Berkeley, California, United States
- Died: 9 May 1981 (aged 64); Cambridge, Massachusetts, United States
- Education: Bryn Mawr College
- Occupations: Writer, journalist
- Spouse: Paul J. Mitarachi
- Relatives: Austin Tappan Wright (father); Melusina Fay Peirce (great-aunt); Amy Fay (great-aunt)
- Writing career
- Language: English
- Subjects: Essay, novella

Sylvia Wright (21 January 1917 - 9 May 1981) was an American author and journalist. She was editor of Harper's Bazaar for a number of years. She is chiefly remembered for coining the word mondegreen, for a misheard word or phrase in a lyric.

== Early life and education ==
Sylvia Wright was born on 21 January 1917, in Berkeley, California. She was the second of four children born to Austin Tappan Wright and Margaret Stone Wright. Her father was a lawyer and a professor of law. He taught at the University of California, Berkeley and later at the University of Pennsylvania Law School. He is noted as the author of the monumental fantasy novel Islandia.

Not much is known about Sylvia's schooling. She graduated from Bryn Mawr College.

== Career ==
=== Islandia ===
After her father's death in 1931, Wright worked with her mother to retrieve, type and edit her father's unpublished manuscript. After Margaret's death in 1937, Sylvia continued the work, with the assistance of Mark Saxton. The novel was finally published by Farrar & Rinehart in 1942.

=== Journalism and writing ===
During the 1950s, Wright worked as editor of Harper's Bazaar. She wrote numerous articles in prominent magazines of the time, mostly with a comic touch. One of those was "The Death of Lady Mondegreen", published in the November 1954 issue of Harper's Magazine, which contributed the word mondegreen to the English language.

== Later life and death ==
After around 1960, for reasons that are not clear, Wright stopped writing humorous articles. In 1969 she published three novellas, which were collected in a single volume entitled A Shark-infested Rice Pudding. A reviewer writing in 2023 says, "Despite its extraordinarily odd title, A Shark-Infested Rice Pudding may be the best work of fiction I’ve read this year."

In the last few years of her life, Wright was engaged in writing a biography of her great-aunt, the feminist, author and teacher Melusina Fay Peirce. In 1977, she became a fellow of the Bunting Institute at Radcliffe College, where she carried out research for the book.

Wright died of cancer on 9 May 1981, leaving the biography of Peirce unfinished. She was survived by her husband Paul J. Mitarachi and their son. The manuscript of the biography is held at the Schlesinger Library, Harvard University.

== Books by Sylvia Wright ==
- Get Away from me with those Christmas Gifts ... and Other Reactions. McGraw Hill. 1957.
- A Shark-infested Rice Pudding. 1969.
