= Eduard Ovčáček =

Czech painter, sculptor and educator (1933–2022)

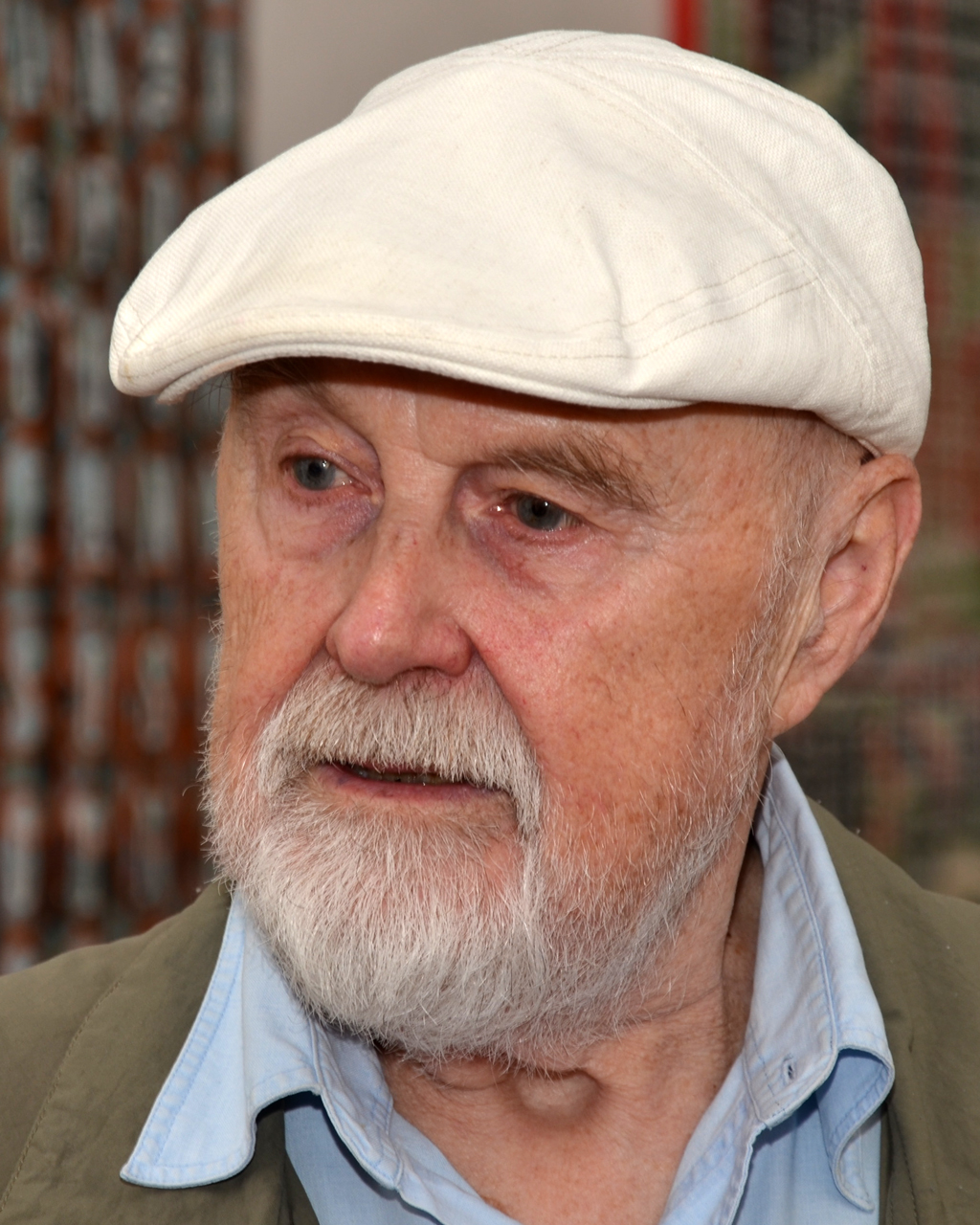
Ovčáček in 2017

Eduard Ovčáček (5 March 1933 – 5 December 2022) was a Czech graphic artist, sculptor, lettrist, painter, and professor at the University of Ostrava. His main artistic focus was classical graphic art, visual and concrete poetry, serigraphic art (screen-print), collage, lettrist photography, events and installations, structural and digital graphic art. Paintings, sculptures, and geometrical objects fell within his interest as well.

== Biography and activities ==
Ovčáček was born in Třinec, Czechoslovakia on 5 March 1933. Between 1957 and 1963 he studied at the Academy of Fine Arts and Design in Bratislava, Slovakia under professor Peter Matejka. He also studied at Academy of Arts, Architecture and Design in Prague under professor Antonín Kybal (1962). Already at that time he was strongly involved in graphic art and started to use it in order to express his own artistic potential. Together with Miloš Urbásek, friend and fellow artist, Ovčáček founded, in 1960, an independent group of artists called "Konfrontace". This artistic group explored and dealt with informel, one of the then attractive forms of abstract art.

From the beginning of the 1960s, Ovčáček kept close contacts with Polish artists, those contacts continued even after the occupation of the Czechoslovakia by the Warsaw pact forces in 1968. He established very friendly relations especially with Marian Bogusz, the principal protagonist of Polish art scene of that period, as well as with his friends. He also kept contacts with similarly oriented artists from other countries.

In 1967 Ovčáček co-founded the Club of Concretists. After that, he commenced to devote himself intensively to the serigraphic art, that being then popular especially in United States (pop-art and op-art). His serigraphic works often contain and mix classical scripture, once-and-future signs and human, often very erotic and suggestive, figures.

Ovčáček criticised strongly the occupation of the Czechoslovakia in 1968. He took part in a lot of dissident and illegal activities. His series Lesson by Great A was created immediately after the invasion of Warsaw Pact armed forces to Prague, in the moment when the censorship has not yet been firmly re-established. This series of artworks thus had the chance to be published in Czechoslovak magazine "Literární listy" and in some other periodicals in the Czechoslovakia and abroad. Also, similarly to e.g. the former Czechoslovak and Czech president Václav Havel, Ovčáček was one of the signatories of Charter 77.

At the end of 20th century Ovčáček organised installations and events with burning ropes (e.g. event "Zastavený čas II., Třebíč, 1994). He was later focused on, examines and improves the possibilities of use of digital technology in serigraphy. Sometimes he exploited his own older themes that he had already applied under another technique earlier.

First author's summary exhibition of lettrist photographs (often with erotic motives) took place in 2009 in Ostrava, Czech Republic.

Ovčáček participated in lot of international exhibitions and symposia (for example I. International plein air in Osieki, Poland in 1963 and II. Biennale form przestrzennych – Elbląg (Poland) in 1967). Also, he was the founder of the serigraphic workshops (Ostrava university, first workshop in 1997).

His favourite number was "3", i.e. the number prevailing in his date of birth. Ovčáček used this number very often and in various formats and shapes in his artworks, e.g.: serigraphs 333 B or Trojky (2007) or oil on canvas 333 (1968).

Ovčáček worked as professor at the College of Arts of Ostrawa University (Czech Republic) and kept contacts with academic fellows namely in Slovakia and Poland (above all, universities in Katowice, Kraków and Łódź). He lived in Ostrava, Czech Republic. His artworks are in numerous public and private collections in the Czech Republic, Europe, Asia and America.

Ovčáček died on 5 December 2022, at the age of 89.

== Awards ==
- 1965 International exhibition "Złote grono", Zielona Góra, Poland, Award for graphic art;
- 1968 I. Biennale "Výzkumy grafiky", Jihlava, Czech Republic, Certificate of merit for graphic art;
- 1995 I. International triennale of graphic art INTER-KONTAKT-GRAFIK 1995, Prague, Czech Republic, Grand Prix of the capital city of Prague, Prague – Kraków;
- 1996 Biennale of Czech graphic art, Česká spořitelna award for collection of graphic sheets;
- 1998 International graphic art exhibition to commemorate the 100 years of death of F. Rops, Namur, Belgium, 1. Award for graphic art;
- 1999 – Vladimír Boudník Award, Nadace Inter-Kontakt-Grafik Prague, Czech Republic;
- 2000 – Graphic artwork of the year, Certificate of merit in category A, Prague, Czech Republic;
- 2004 – Graphic artwork of the year, Certificate of merit in category A, Prague, Czech Republic.

== Books ==
- 1995 Lesson by Great A, anthology of concrete and visual poetry. Trigon, Prague, 1995;
- 1999 Eduard Ovčáček: Artworks from 1959–1999. Gema Art, Prague, 1995;
- 2007 Eduard Ovčáček 1956–2006, monography. Gallery, Prague, 2007.

== Pedagogic activity ==
- 1963–1968 Department of art theory and education at College of Arts of Palacký University of Olomouc (Czech Republic);
- Professor and Head of Department of Graphic art and design at College of Arts of Ostrava University (Czech Republic).

== Membership in artistic groups ==
- Kroky;
- Art group "Other geometry";
- Klub konkrétistů (1967, one of the co-founders);
- Nové sdružení pražských umělců (1992);
- SČUG Hollar (from 2001);
- SVÚ Mánes (1992–2004 the membership was terminated).

== Individual exhibitions (selection) ==
- 1966 Galerie Lidová demokracie at Charles square, Prague, Czech Republic; Galerie Forum Stadtpark, Graz, Austria
- 1967 Galerie výtvarného umění Ostrava, Czech Republic; Kleine Graphik Galerie, Brémy, Germany
- 1970 Vlastivědný ústav, Frýdek-Místek castle, Czech Republic
- 1980 Dům kultury, Orlová, Czech Republic
- 1981 MKS – Český Těšín, Czech Republic; Galerie Pragxis, Essen, Germany; Galerie Slavia, Brémy, Germany
- 1983 MKS – Blansko, Czech Republic
- 1984 Malá galerie Čs. spisovatele, Prague, Czech Republic
- 1985 Galerie výtvarného umění, Hodonín, Czech Republic
- 1986 Galerie Atrium, Prague, Czech Republic
- 1987 Artotéka Opatov, Prague, Czech Republic; Malá galerie Čs. Spisovatele, Brno, Czech Republic; OKS – Sokolov castle, Czech Republic
- 1989 Gluri Suter Huus, Wettingen, Switzerland; Institut makromolekulární chemie, Prague, Czech Republic
- 1990 Malá galerie Čs. spisovatele, Prague, Czech Republic
- 1991 Galerie Fronta, Prague, Czech Republic; Galerie Malovaný dům, Třebíč, Czech Republic
- 1992 Galerie výtvarného umění v Ostravě, Czech Republic; Oblastní galerie Vysočiny, Jihlava, Czech Republic; Galerie P.M. Bohúňa, Liptovský Mikuláš, Slovakia; Okresní vlastivědné museum, Šumperk, Czech Republic; Galerie Sochor, Hamburk, Germany; České kulturní středisko, Bratislava, Slovakia; Galerie Nová síň, Prague, Czech Republic; Future & Umělecký klub, Prague, Czech Republic
- 1993 Dům umění města Brna – stará radnice, Czech Republic; Galerie výtvarného umění v Ostravě, Czech Republic; Státní galerie, Zlín, Czech Republic; Centrum Sztuki w Bytomiu, Poland; Galerie Jensen, Hamburk, Germany
- 1994 MKS Krnov, Czech Republic; Galerie Paseka, Prague, Czech Republic; Středoevropská galerie, Prague, Czech Republic
- 1995 Galerie im Rathaus, Tempelhof, Berlín, Germany; Státní museum, Frenštát pod Radhoštěm, Czech Republic
- 1996 Výstavní síň Sokolská, Ostrava, Czech Republic; Výstavní síň Synagoga, Hranice, Czech Republic; Galerie Langův dům, Frýdek-Místek, Czech Republic
- 1997 České centrum, Berlín, Germany; Die Künstlergilde Galerie, Esslingen, Germany; Antikvariát Černý pavouk, Ostrava, Czech Republic
- 1998 Galerie am Südbahnhof, Mainz, Germany; Staroměstská radnice, Prague, Czech Republic; Inter-Kontakt-Grafik, Prague, Czech Republic; Státní galerie ve Zlíně, Czech Republic
- 1999 Grafika roku, Staroměstská radnice, Prague, Czech Republic; Galerie moderního umění, Hradec Králové, Czech Republic; České museum výtvarných umění, Prague (Otevřené možnosti), Czech Republic; Dům umění, Opava, Czech Republic
- 2000 Galéria mesta Bratislavy, Pálffyho palace, Slovakia; Galerie Felixe Jeneweina města Kutné Hory, Czech Republic; Galerie Jiřího a Běly Kolářových, Prague, Czech Republic
- 2001 Galerie výtvarných umění v Ostravě (Eduard Ovčáček na Ostravsku), Czech Republic; Štátná galéria Banská Bystrica, Slovakia; Galerie Magna, Ostrava, Czech Republic; Zámecká galerie výtvarného umění Chagall, Czech Republic; Galerie Hrozen, České Budějovice, Czech Republic
- 2002 Galerie Aspekt, Brno, Czech Republic; Instytut Sztuki – Uniwersytet Śląski w Katowicach – Filia w Cieszynie, Poland
- 2003 Galerie Langův dům, Frýdek-Místek, Czech Republic; Výstavní síň Sokolská, Ostrava, Czech Republic
- 2004 Krajská galerie ve Zlíně, Czech Republic
- 2005 Galerie Magna, Ostrava, Czech Republic; Oblastní galerie Liberec, Czech Republic; Galerie Aspekt, Brno, Czech Republic
- 2006 Museum Novojičínska, Příbor (Hommage to S. Freud, i.a. works Extáze, Sade – Archetypy, Von Curval), Czech Republic
- 2007 Dům umění, Ostrava (Grafika z let 1961–1970, i.a. works from series Defloration), Czech Republic; Galerie Smečky, Prague ("Peripetie písma a znaků"), Czech Republic
- 2008 Galerie Beseda, Ostrava (Eduard Ovčáček 75), Czech Republic; Galerie Trisia, Třinec (Eduard Ovčáček 75), Czech Republic
- 2009 Museum umění, Olomouc (Komunikace písmem a obraz), Czech Republic; Maison Pierre Werner, Luxembourg-Ville, Luxembourg – (Letterstory, i.a. hand paper, collage, sculptures, architektons); Autorská galerie české fotografie, Ostrava (Fotografie), Czech Republic
- 2013 Musée de l'Imprimerie de Lyon (Eduard Ovčáček Oeuvres graphiques & sculptures), Lyon, France (October 2013-March 2014)

== Sources ==
- Lesson by Great A, anthology of concrete and visual poetry. Trigon, Praha, 1995;
- Eduard Ovčáček, Artworks from 1959–1999. Gema Art, Praha, 1995;
- Eduard Ovčáček 1956–2006, monography. Gallery, Praha, 2007;
- Eduard Ovčáček, Interpretace – Kresby / Plastiky. Příbor, 2006.
- Eduard Ovčáček, Oeuvres graphiques, Musée de l'Imprimerie, Lyon, 2013.
