= Rinehart & Company =

American publishing company

- Founded: 1946
- Founder: Stanley M. Rinehart; Frederick R. Rinehart
- Successor: Holt, Rinehart and Winston
- Headquarters location: New York City
- Publication types: Books

Rinehart & Company was an American publishing company founded in 1946. Renamed Rinehart & Company in 1946, the publishing company merged with Henry Holt and Company and the John C. Winston Company in 1960, to form Holt, Rinehart and Winston (HRW).

== History ==
Frederick R. Rinehart formed a publishing house, Farrar & Rinehart, in partnership with John C. Farrar and Stanley M. Rinehart, Jr., his late brother.

In 1946, after Mr. Farrar's departure for the new house of Farrar & Straus, the firm became Rinehart & Company.

Rinehart & Company was the successor to Farrar & Rinehart, Inc. The latter was renamed Rinehart & Company in 1946 following the departure of John C. Farrar. The brothers Stanley M. Rinehart, Jr. and Frederick R. Rinehart continued to operate the company until its merger with Henry Holt and Company and the John C. Winston Company in 1960, to form Holt, Rinehart and Winston (HRW).

The Rinehart brothers were the sons of Mary Roberts Rinehart, a famous mystery writer whose books were published by the company. Rinehart had supported her sons by leaving Doubleday, Doran when they (with Farrar) established Farrar & Rinehart in 1929; her bestselling mysteries were a mainstay of the new imprint.

== Authors ==
Authors and their known dates of association with Rinehart & Company:

- Hervey Allen (1948-1950)
- Charles H. Baker, Jr. (1958)
- Katharine Brush
- Gerald Butler (1946–1951)
- Robert Cantwell (1947–1948))
- Marjory Stoneman Douglas (1947–1958)
- William Lindsay Gresham (1946–1953)
- Langston Hughes (1956–1957)
- Norman Mailer (1948–1951)
- Thomas Hal Phillips (1950)
- Mary Roberts Rinehart (1946–1958)
- Charles M. Schulz (1952–1960)
- Fredric Wertham (1954)
- Philip Wylie (1946-1957)

== Book series ==
- Rinehart Editions
- Rivers of America (1946–1960)
