= Islandia (novel) =

1942 utopian fiction novel by Austin Tappan Wright

- First edition cover
- Author: Austin Tappan Wright
- Language: English
- Publisher: Farrar & Rinehart
- Publication date: 1942
- Publication place: United States
- Media type: Print (Hardcover)
- Pages: 1014 pp
- ISBN: 1585671487
- LC Class: PS3545.R157

Islandia is a classic novel of utopian fiction by Austin Tappan Wright, a University of California, Berkeley Law School Professor. Written as a hobby over a long period, the manuscript was edited posthumously and reduced by about a third by author/editor Mark Saxton with the advice and consent of Wright's wife and daughter, and was published first in hardcover format by the company Farrar & Rinehart in 1942, eleven years after the author's 1931 death.

Islandia is a fully realized imaginary country, though more akin to a utopia than a standard fantasy.

The original Islandia was conceived by Wright when he was a boy. Creating its civilization became his lifelong leisure occupation. The complete Islandia papers include "a detailed history ... complete with geography, genealogy, representations from its literature, language and culture". The complete and never published version of Islandia can be found in the Houghton Library at Harvard University. A 61-page Introduction to Islandia by Basil Davenport was published along with the original novel in 1942.

The protagonist and narrator of the novel is an American named John Lang, who graduates from Harvard University in 1905. The setting is Islandia, an imaginary country set in the real world of that time. This remote nation "at the tip of the Karain semi-continent" is near "the unexplored wastes of Antarctica in the Southern Hemisphere". The citizens have imposed "the Hundred Law, limiting access to Islandia to a bare one hundred visitors at a time". Wright may have had in mind both the self-imposed isolation of Siam, starting in 1688, and that of Japan under the Tokugawa shogunate.

== Themes ==
Islandia's culture has many "progressive" features, including the rehabilitation of prostitutes into respectable society, the citizens' love of nature, and their rural lives. Everyone, including members of the upper classes, engages in some kind of useful work, especially farming. The word for city in Islandian, "elainry", literally means "place of many people"; all city families have a country home to which they can return.

Like other writers of speculative fiction, Wright decided to imagine a society that differs from ours in one or several major features. One of these is that, while Islandian civilization is primitive technologically, its mores are different from Western culture's. Wright wrote much of the story during the 1920s, but set it before World War I, providing a particularly stark contrast between Islandian philosophy and the relatively stern customs of Western countries of the same time. Immersed in the Islandian culture, John Lang steadily increases his understanding of his emotions and his sexual feelings. He becomes accustomed to the slightly more sexually permissive Islandian culture. Wright's description may have been intended as a positive comment on the increasing sexual permissiveness of American culture of the 1920s.

Another difference between Islandian culture and the West is that Islandians reject most modern Western technology. It is a rural society with an arcadian philosophy, which Dorn humorously describes as "enlightened Hedonism". They're not interested in building railroads for quick travel. But they do not reject all Western technology; they use a few Western inventions that they judge to be worthwhile, such as modern rifles. At one point, one Islandian uses a sewing machine.

Among John Lang's discoveries, he finds that the Islandians use four words for love:

- alia: love of place and family land and lineage (heimat)
- amia: love of friends (philia)
- ania: desire for marriage and commitment (storge)
- apia: sexual attraction (eros)

== Plot ==
Islandia
- 'Islandia' location
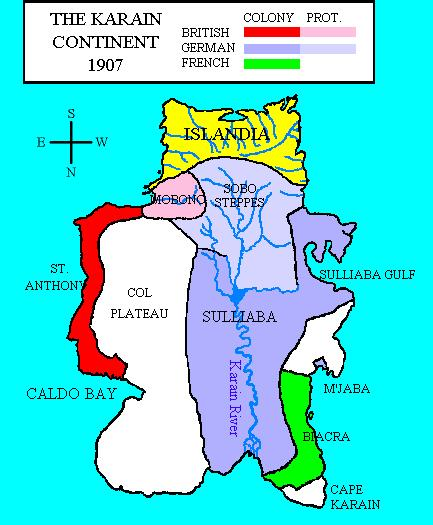
- Karain semi-continent, with Islandia at south (top)

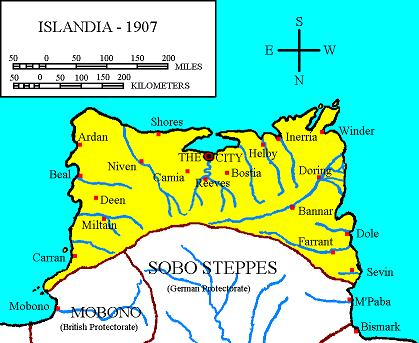
- Islandia in 1907
- Created by: Austin Tappan Wright
- Genre: Utopian fiction

In-universe information
- Other name: Kingdom of Islandia
- Type: Constitutional monarchy
- Ethnic groups: Islandians, Bants
- Locations: The City (capital)
- Population: 3 million
- Language(s): Islandian

While an undergraduate at Harvard, John Lang becomes friends with an Islandian fellow-student named Dorn, and decides to learn the Islandian language (of which there are very few speakers outside Islandia). Once he has graduated, his uncle, a prominent businessman, arranges his appointment as American consul to Islandia, based primarily on his ability to speak the language. Gradually John Lang learns that his tacit mission as American consul is to do whatever is necessary to increase American trade opportunities in Islandia. He does not begin this mission right away, preferring to get to know the country and the people first.

John Lang meets and becomes infatuated with Dorn's sister, Dorna. They spend some time together alone, which John finds unnerving at first, since they are not chaperoned. When Dorna comes to understand John's feelings, she tells him that she does not love him in return in that way (though he wonders whether she means "cannot", or "will not"). She accepts the marriage proposal of the King instead, a handsome young man who has been courting her for some time.

One of the culminations of the plot is the decision by the people of Islandia to reject the demands of the Great Powers for unrestricted trade and immigration, choosing instead to maintain their tradition of isolation. As this political struggle intensifies, John Lang sympathizes with the Islandians, to the great disappointment of many American businessmen who desire new lucrative trade opportunities, including John Lang's uncle.

Near the end of the novel, John Lang is allowed to become a citizen of Islandia as a reward for heroism during an attack by a neighboring group. He later falls in love with an American friend with whom he has maintained steady correspondence. They decide to marry, and when she arrives in Islandia she, too, is granted citizenship.

== Sequels ==
There are also three sequels/prequels, all written by Mark Saxton, the man who edited the original Islandia manuscript. Reviewers describe these books as entertaining and self-contained. The prequels concern events that are mentioned briefly in the original novel, and are likely based on Wright's unpublished notes. All three books were published with the permission of Wright's estate. Sylvia Wright, Wright's daughter and the executrix of the estate, died shortly before the third Saxton book was completed, and there have been no additional books since.

- The Islar, Islandia Today - A Narrative of Lang III. Published in 1969, this book is set in the then-present day. The plot concerns a coup attempt in Islandia that occurs while the national government is debating whether to join the United Nations. The protagonist, as indicated in the title, is John Lang's grandson.
- The Two Kingdoms, published in 1979, is a prequel set in the 14th century. The plot concerns the events surrounding the reign of the only female ruler in Islandian history, and the dynastic change that ensued from this.
- Havoc in Islandia, published in 1982, is yet another prequel, set in the 12th century. The Roman Catholic Church attempts to overthrow the government of Islandia, and, having failed, is itself expelled from the country (parallel to the expulsion of Christians from Japan).

There is an additional sequel titled Islandia Revisited by Richard N. Farmer. This is set in Islandia in 1944.

== Cultural references ==
Islandia is mentioned briefly as a modern instance of myth in Hamlet's Mill (p. 51), along with The Islar.

Islandian kinds of love are mentioned by Ursula K. Le Guin in her novel Always Coming Home, though she only mentions three of the four kinds (ania, apia and alia).

The novel was a significant influence on the writing of Anne McCaffrey, who read and re-read the novel in her youth.

== See also ==
- Worldbuilding
- Greek words for love
- The Four Loves
