= Alan Rinehart =

American journalist

Alan Gillespie Rinehart (1900–1982) was a writer, film producer, and playwright. Rinehart was a son of mystery writer Mary Roberts Rinehart and a brother of book publishers Stanley Rinehart Jr. and Frederick Roberts Rinehart.

== Early life and education ==
Rinehart was born in Allegheny, Pennsylvania (which has since merged with Pittsburgh) in 1900. He graduated from the Morristown School in Morristown, New Jersey (now Morristown-Beard School) in 1919. During his time at the school, Rinehart wrote stories and poetry for The Morristonian, the student newspaper. After studying at Harvard University in Cambridge, Massachusetts, Rinehart received his bachelor's degree from the School of Mining at the University of Pittsburgh. During the period between his studies at the two universities, Rinehart worked as a cowboy in the Western U.S.

== Career and military service ==
Rinehart joined the Story Department at Paramount Pictures Corporation in 1931. He worked as an editor and producer for Paramount. Rinehart also worked as a correspondent and national affairs editor at Time magazine during its early years in the 1920s.

During World War II, Rinehart served as a special assistant to the War Shipping Administration's East Coast director. He worked as a convoy truant officer. Rinehart also served in the U.S. Marines during World War I. In 1930, Rinehart penned the play Volcano. Messmore Kendall, owner of the Capitol Theatre, acquired it in November of that year. He tasked Robert Milton with staging the play. Farrar & Rinehart, the publishing company run by Rinehart's brothers, published the play's text in wide release.

== Purchase of Cabbage Island ==
In 1936, Rinehart bought Cabbage Island, a 100-acre island located five miles from Pine Island, Florida. Rinehart's mother Mary constructed a six-bedroom winter home on the island to craft her novels. In 1938, Rinehart and his mother provided a facility on the island to run a tarpon study by Charles Breder, curator and director of fishes and aquatic biology at the American Museum of Natural History. The Rinehart property now operates as the Cabbage Key Inn and Restaurant.

== Family ==
On September 19, 1925, Rinehart married Gratia Houghton Rinehart. She was a niece of Alanson B. Houghton, the U.S. ambassador to England. They had two children together before their divorce in June 1938. She died eleven months later, in May 1939. In 1946, Rinehart married textile designer and stylist Ernestine Hines Dobbs.
