= The Sisters (1938 film) =

1938 drama film by Anatole Litvak

- Theatrical release poster
- Directed by: Anatole Litvak
- Screenplay by: Milton Krims; Julius J. Epstein
- Based on: The Sisters; 1937 novel by Myron Brinig
- Produced by: Anatole Litvak
- Starring: Errol Flynn; Bette Davis
- Cinematography: Tony Gaudio
- Edited by: Warren Low
- Music by: Max Steiner
- Distributed by: Warner Bros. Pictures
- Release date: October 14, 1938
- Running time: 99 minutes
- Country: United States
- Language: English
- Budget: over $1 million

The Sisters is a 1938 American drama film produced and directed by Anatole Litvak and starring Errol Flynn and Bette Davis. The screenplay by Milton Krims is based on the 1937 novel of the same title by Myron Brinig.

== Plot ==
At a ball held on the night of the 1904 presidential election, serious Louise, frivolous Helen, and stolid Grace, daughters of Silver Bow, Montana pharmacist Ned Elliott and his wife Rose, find themselves dealing with romantic prospects. Tom Knivel is about to propose to Louise when Frank Medlin, a San Francisco sports reporter, asks her to dance. Infatuated with the young woman, Frank extends his stay, and at Sunday dinner in the Elliott home he announces he and Louise plan to wed. Although her parents disapprove of the union, Louise leaves for San Francisco with Frank that night. Grace eventually marries the jilted Tom and Helen weds wealthy Sam Johnson, who promises her freedom and asks for nothing in return.

Although facing financial difficulty, Louise urges Frank to complete his novel. When she becomes pregnant, she decides to keep her condition a secret, but finally reveals the truth when she accompanies Frank to a boxing match and the smoke and smells make her ill. Returning home, Louise suffers a miscarriage while climbing the stairs to their apartment, and her distraught husband begins to drink heavily.

Overwhelmed by increasing medical bills and a sense of worthlessness, Frank demands a raise but is rebuffed by his editor who, telling him his writing is suffering as a result of his drinking, fires him. Louise tries to console him by announcing she has found employment at a local department store, but Frank's hurt pride prompts him to forbid her to work. Louise ignores his demand, and while her husband struggles to find a job, she thrives as secretary to store owner William Benson.

Fellow sportswriter Tim Hazelton suggests Frank leave San Francisco in order to get a fresh start, and he decides to accept work on a ship bound for Singapore. When Louise arrives home, she finds a note from Frank and rushes to the docks, where a policeman mistaking her for a prostitute arrests her. By the time she is released, Frank's ship has sailed.

A few hours later, much of the city, including Louise's apartment building, is destroyed by the 1906 earthquake. When Ned is unable to contact his daughter, he travels to San Francisco to search for her, but she has sought refuge with her friend Flora Gibbon in Flora's mother's bordello in Oakland. With William's help, Ned locates Louise and brings her back to San Francisco.

Two years pass, the city has been rebuilt, and Louise is an executive in the department store. When she learns Tom has been unfaithful to Grace, she returns to Silver Bow and is reunited with both her sisters. Meanwhile, Frank returns to San Francisco, and although he is ill, he travels to Silver Bow with Tim when he learns Louise is there. At the ball on the night of the 1908 presidential election, Frank and Louise are reunited and decide to give their marriage another chance.

== Cast ==
- Errol Flynn as Frank Medlin
- Bette Davis as Louise Elliott
- Anita Louise as Helen Elliott
- Ian Hunter as William Benson
- Donald Crisp as Tim Hazelton
- Beulah Bondi as Rose Elliott
- Jane Bryan as Grace Elliott
- Alan Hale as Sam Johnson
- Dick Foran as Tom Knivel
- Henry Travers as Ned Elliott
- Patric Knowles as Norman French
- Lee Patrick as Flora Gibbon
- Laura Hope Crews as Flora's Mother
- Janet Shaw as Stella Johnson
- Harry Davenport as Doc Moore
- Ruth Garland as Laura Bennett
- John Warburton as Anthony Bittick
- Paul Harvey as Caleb Ammon
- Mayo Methot as Blonde
- Irving Bacon as Robert Forbes
- Arthur Hoyt as Tom Selig

== Original novel ==
The Sisters
- Author: Myron Brinig
- Language: English
- Genre: Melodrama
- Publication date: 1937
- Publication place: United States

The film was based on a popular novel which was published in 1937. The New York Times said it "is a story that takes hold of you and keeps you engrossed until you have finished it." It instantly became a best seller. It was on the Chicago Tribune best seller list for 19 weeks.

Film rights were bought by Warner Bros. Pictures.

== Production ==
=== Casting ===
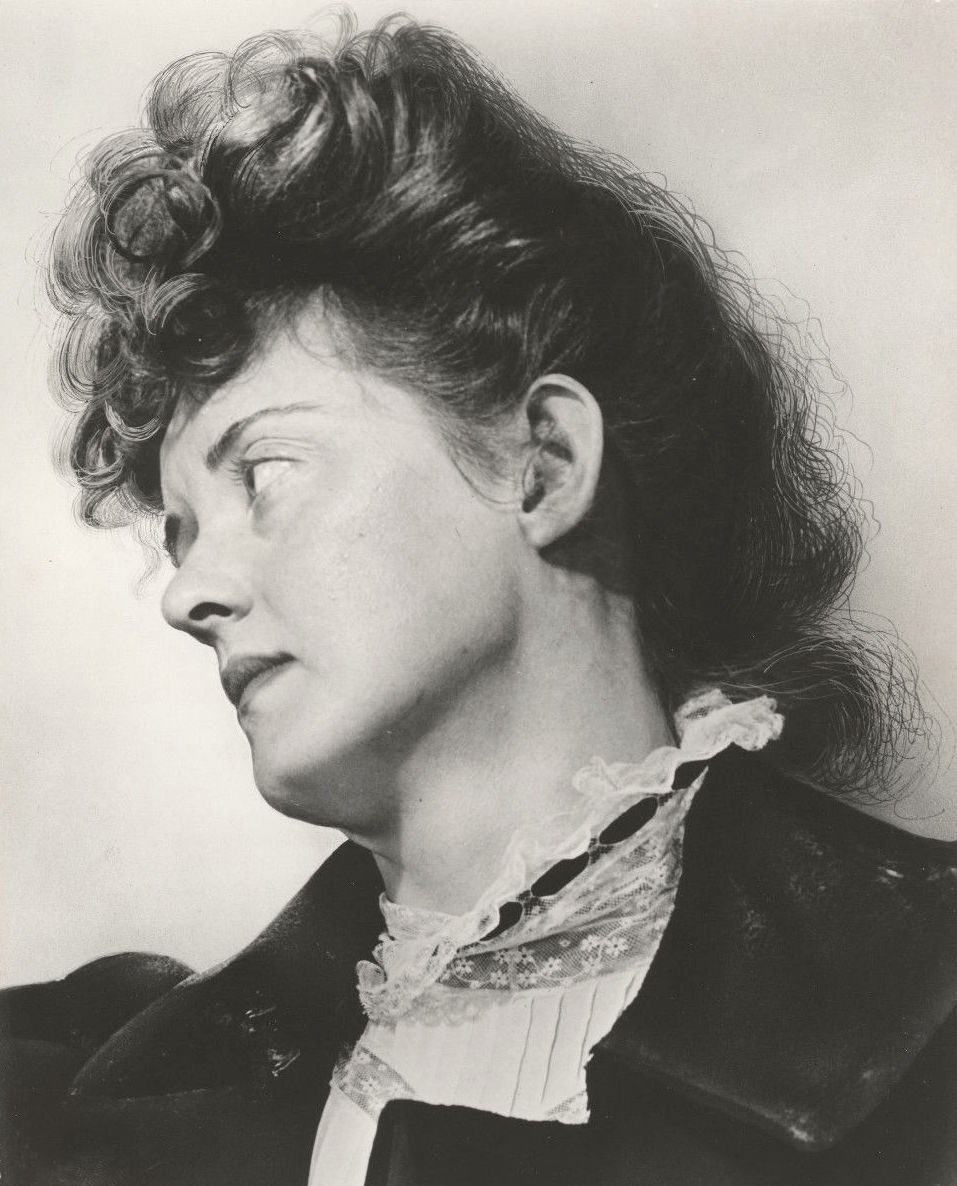
Davis in a publicity still for the film

In May 1937, Miriam Hopkins and Kay Francis were originally announced as female stars. In December 1937 Warners announced the film would be made the following year from a script by Milton Krims. Producer David Lewis wrote "when I took over the film it had been intended for a less important cast, but as the project developed, Warner and Wallis began to take some interest in it."

In April 1938 Irene Dunne was announced for the lead. By this stage Anatole Litvak was attached to direct and Jane Bryan was to play one of the sisters.

Then in May, Warners said that Dunne had been replaced by Bette Davis. Following Jezebel, Bette Davis was dismayed to be assigned to Comet Over Broadway, a melodrama in which she would portray a Broadway actress who sacrifices her career to care for her ne'er-do-well husband when he is released from prison. "This was the first nothing script I was given since my court battle in England," Davis later recalled, referring to the lawsuit in which she tried to win her freedom from Warner Bros. after being forced to appear in a series of mediocre films. "It was heartbreaking to me. After winning a second Academy Award . . . I was asked to appear again in junk."

Davis opted to go on suspension and remained on suspension when the studio offered her Garden of the Moon, a Busby Berkeley musical, instead. "I was on suspension for a good part of the year following Jezebel. So much wasted time at a time when I felt my career could from then on become a truly successful one... It took a lot of courage to go on suspension. One received no salary... I couldn't afford it, nor could I afford, career-wise, to make films such as Comet Over Broadway and Garden of the Moon!"

After Irene Dunne declined the role of Louise in The Sisters, Davis was offered it and accepted. The script had originally been purchased for Kay Francis, but was shelved when the studio decided to relegate her to B movies for the remainder of her contract. Davis said, "I was delighted with this part because it was a change of pace... I was always challenged by a new type of person to play."

Davis had been put on suspension 1 April 1938. She and Wallis of Warners agreed to a truce, with The Sisters as part of the settlement on 29 April. John Garfield was originally meant to play the part of the reporter; then Fredric March was sought. By May 11 Anita Louise and Bryan had firmed as Davis' sisters and George Brent or Humphrey Bogart were contenders for the male lead. Lewis said that George Brent was set to co star but the producer pushed for Errol Flynn.

Eventually Flynn got the role. Although Davis welcomed the opportunity to co-star with Errol Flynn ("he was a big box office star at the time and it could only be beneficial to me to work with him"), she was unhappy to learn he alone was being given billing above the title. "At that time I had no billing clause in my contract," she recalled. "I felt after Jezebel that my name should always appear above the title. That is star billing." It was Flynn's least sympathetic role to date.

After taking a determined stand with the studio, Davis was billed above the title, although second to Flynn. Producer Hal B. Wallis later admitted the billing dispute was the studio's way of keeping Davis in check and "giving her a dose of her own medicine."

=== Shooting ===
Filming started June 7, 1938. Lewis said Flynn shaved off his moustache the night before filming was to begin, knowing that Jack Warner would be unhappy but also guessing that Warner would not want to pay for a full day of retakes - this proved to be the case.

For the earthquake sequence, which took three weeks to film but lasted only 2½ minutes on screen, the studio spent $200,000 on special sets that were razed and burned, in addition to using footage from the 1927 Warner Brothers film Old San Francisco. It was felt that the film had to match the earthquake in San Francisco (1936).

=== Re-shoots ===
When preview audiences responded unfavorably to the film's original ending, in which Louise married William Benson as she did in the novel, studio executives decided to film a new one in which she reunites with her seafaring husband instead.

On July 18 Flynn reportedly told Warners executives that he would not film a new ending.

"Oh dear, how many films I have been in that have suffered by the change by the studio of the ending," Davis later lamented. "Certainly the original ending of The Sisters was the right one."

In his score, Max Steiner interpolated the folk ballad "Oh My Darling, Clementine" in the scenes set in Silver Bow.

== Critical reception ==
Lewis wrote "The Sisters turned out to be a well-produced, respectable Picture. Not a big box-office success (maybe Jack was right about Flynn’s moustache), but very acceptable to the studio on all levels."

Life observed, "Bette Davis acts with such extraordinary grace, sensitivity, and distinction that hers is already being acclaimed the movie performance of the year."

Variety called the film "a virtual cavalcade of early 20th-century American history" and added, "Davis turns in one of her most scintillating performances. Flynn's happy-go-lucky reporter is a vivid portrayal although his slight English accent seems incongruous."

Lewis wrote that Litvak "as a director... was cold and... it showed in the film. He had a fine camera eye and his work was pleasing to the eye, but there was a lack of character development and relationship in the performances."

== Notes ==
- Lewis, David (1993). Curtis, James (ed.). The Creative Producer. Metuchen: Scarecrow Press. ISBN 0-8108-2720-4.
