= The Genius of America =

- Title page for The Genius of America (1923)
- Author: Stuart Sherman
- Language: English
- Publisher: The Scribner Press
- Publication date: 1923
- Publication place: United States
- Media type: Print (hardback )
- Pages: 269 pp

The Genius of America (1923) is a collection of essays written by Stuart Sherman. Collectively, the book is a study and opinion piece on the youth of America for the future generations of America. In the book's preface, it is said to be "a kind of sequel" to Americans (1922), a previous essay collection by Sherman.
