= Charles H. Baker Jr. =

American writer

- Born: December 25, 1895; Zellwood, Florida
- Died: November 11, 1987 (aged 91); Naples, Florida
- Occupation: Writer
- Spouse: Pauline Elizabeth Paulsen
- Children: 3

Charles Henry Baker Jr. (December 25, 1895 – November 11, 1987) was an American author best known for his culinary and cocktail writings. These books have become highly collectible among cocktail aficionados and culinary historians.

We are still heartily of the opinion that decent libation supports as many million lives as it threatens; donates pleasure and sparkle to more lives than it shadows; inspires more brilliance in the world of art, music, letters, and common ordinary intelligent conversation, than it dims.

— Charles Henry Baker Jr.

== Biography ==
He was born on Christmas Day in 1895 in Zellwood, Florida, to Jane Paul Baker (1859–1916) and Charles Henry Baker Sr. (1848–1924). Both of his parents were from Pennsylvania. He later attended Trinity College. By 1918, he was working at Norton Abrasives as a grinder in Worcester, Massachusetts; he later worked as a district sales manager. He moved to New York City, where he worked as a magazine editor and submitted stories to small publications. In 1932, Baker met Pauline Elizabeth Paulsen, an heiress to the Paulsen mining fortune, on a world cruise where he had signed on as the cruise line's publicist. After they were married they had built for them an art deco house called Java Head in Coconut Grove, Florida, in which they lived for thirty years. They built a second house in Coconut Grove called Java Head East, where they lived in the 1960s. They later moved to Naples, Florida.

Baker spent much of his life traveling the world and chronicling food and drink recipes for magazines like Esquire, Town & Country, and Gourmet, for which he wrote a column during the 1940s called "Here's How". Baker collected many of those recipes in his two-volume set The Gentleman's Companion: Being an Exotic Cookery and Drinking Book, originally published in 1939 by Derrydale Press. John J. Poister in 1983 wrote, "Volume II of The Gentleman's Companion, by Charles H. Baker Jr., is the best book on exotic drinks I have ever encountered". Condé Nast contributing writer St. John Frizell wrote, "It's his prose, not his recipes, that deserves a place in the canon of culinary literature ... at times humorously grandiloquent, at times intimate and familiar, Baker fills his stories with colorful details about his environment and his drinking companions — Ernest Hemingway and William Faulkner among them". While his culinary nonfiction garnered Baker much praise, he was less well regarded as a novelist. His only novel, Blood of the Lamb, was published in 1946 by Rinehart & Company. About it, a Time reviewer wrote in the magazine's April 22, 1946, issue, "Blood of the Lamb is not much of a novel, but it is long on local color, loud piety, snuff, 'stump liquor' and local talk"

Words to the Wise No. VII. Offering up an earnest plea for recentness in all eggs to be used in cocktails or drinks of any kind, for that matter. A stale or storage egg in a decent mixed drink is like a stale or storage joke in critical and intelligent company. Eschew them rabidly. If really fresh eggs can't be had, mix other type drinks, for the result will reflect no merit round the hearth, no matter how hospitable it may be.

— Charles H. Baker Jr. in The Gentlemen's Companion: Around the World with Jigger, Beaker and Flask

Some of Baker's exotic and often esoteric drink recipes from The Gentleman's Companion are once again finding favor at modern cocktail bars specializing in classic drinks, such as Manhattan's Pegu Club, where Baker's "Jimmie Roosevelt"—a mixture of champagne, cognac, and Chartreuse liqueur—was found on the menu.

He died on November 11, 1987, in Naples, Florida.

== Publications ==
- Rejections of 1927. (1928. Edited by Baker).
- The Gentleman's Companion (two volumes, 1939 edition).
- Blood of the Lamb (1946).
- The Gentleman's Companion: Being an Exotic Drinking Book or Around the World with Jigger, Beaker and Flask (1946 edition).
- The Gentleman's Companion: Being an Exotic Cookery Book or Around the World with Knife, Fork, and Spoon (1946 edition).
- The Gentleman's Companion: Being an Exotic Cookery/Drinking Book (combined volume I and II) (1946 edition)
- Knife, Fork, and Spoon: Eating Around the World (1992).
- The Esquire Culinary Companion (1959).
- The South American Gentleman's Companion (1951).
