= Musée de l'Imprimerie =

Museum of printing in Lyon, France

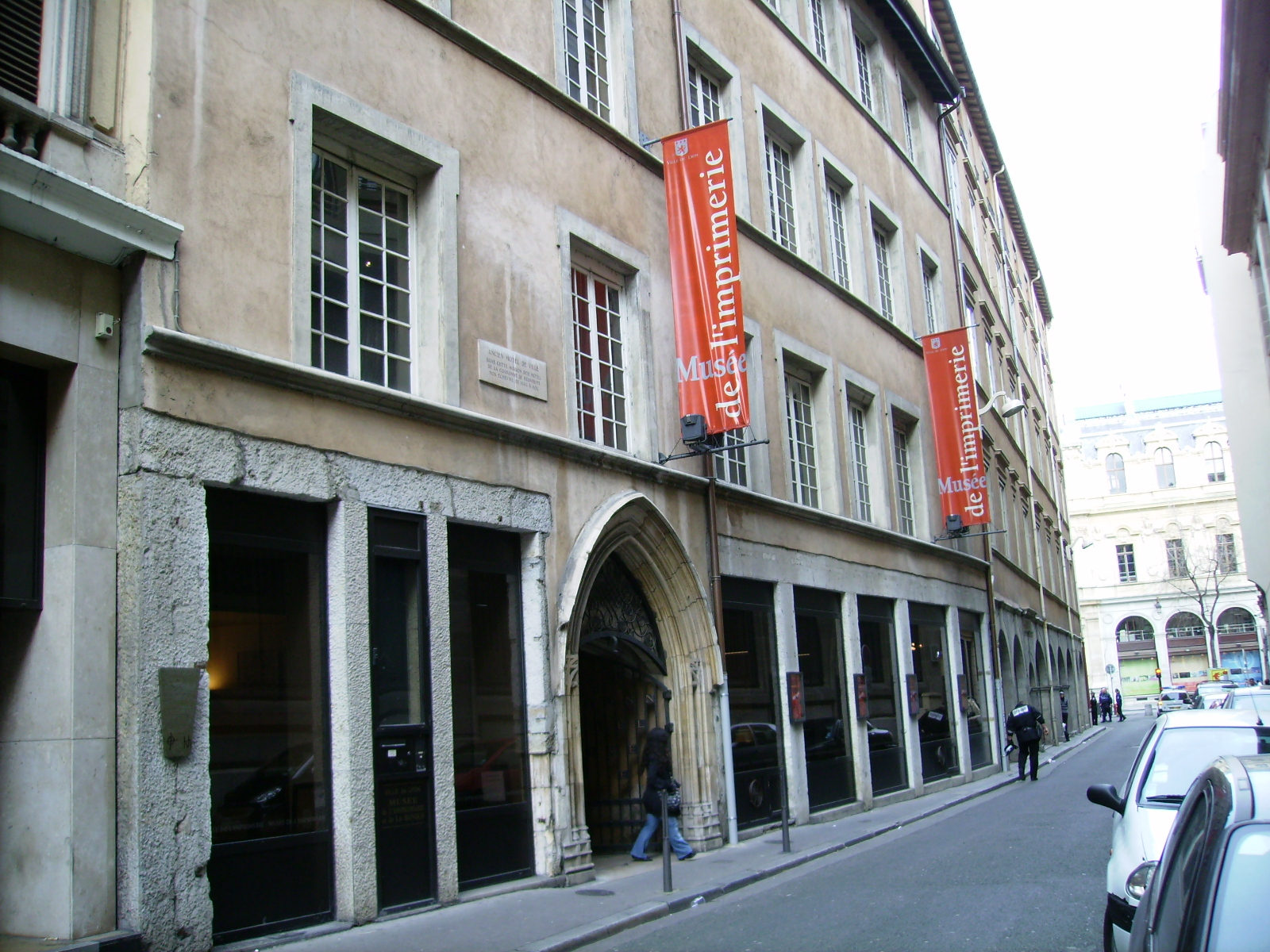
- Entrance of the museum

- Location within Metropole de Lyon

General information
- Location: 2nd arrondissement of Lyon, Lyon, France
- Coordinates: 45°45′52″N 4°50′05″E
- Inaugurated: 18 December 1964

The Musée de l'Imprimerie (French pronunciation: [myze də lɛ̃pʁimʁi]; Musée de l'Imprimerie et de la Communication Graphique; or MICG) is a museum in Lyon, France, with the mission of enhancing, conserving, documenting and valuing the heritage of printed books and graphic arts.

The museum was inaugurated in 1964. In 2006, the Grand Guide Michelin France awarded it two stars out of three and in 2007, the museum had 16,819 visitors.

== History ==
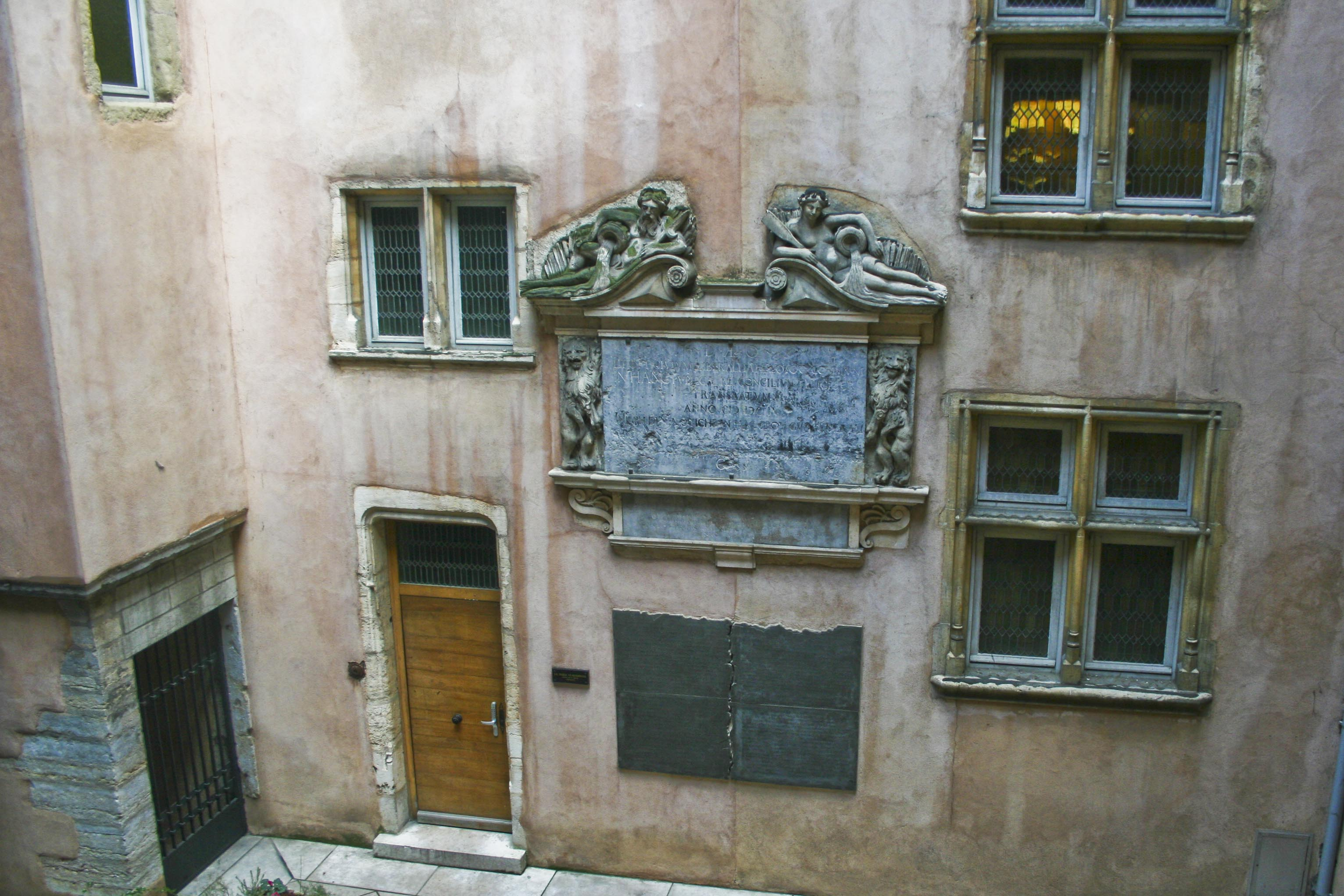
The courtyard of the museum

The Musee de l'Imprimerie was established in Lyon because Lyon had been a centre of printing and the book trade in Europe in the 15th and 16th centuries, and the city held large historical collections of books and the graphic arts. The museum was designed by the master printer and historian Maurice Audin, with the historian of the book, Henri-Jean Martin, then chief curator of the Library of Lyon. There are two banners before the entrance of the Hôtel de la Couronne, which hosted the meetings of the City of Lyon aldermen from 1604 to 1655, and which is currently the headquarters of the Musée de l'Imprimerie, located at 13 rue de la Poulaillerie. In 1957, the building was given to the City of Lyon by the banking corporation, LCL S.A., and on 8 June 1963, the mayor of Lyon, Louis Pradel, inaugurated the Musée de la Banque on the occasion of the centenary of LCL. Finally the current museum was opened in 1964.

The Museum of Printing and Graphic Communication experienced in 2014, on the occasion of its fiftieth anniversary, several changes orchestrated by the then director Alan Marshall. First, the creation of a logo and a graphic charter. The presentation of the permanent collection has also evolved towards a simplification of the documents presented and an adaptation of the comments and explanatory labels to modern readability. Fewer documents, more space for visitors, more visible sections, a marked route. The labels and explanatory panels are bilingual French-English.

Alan Marshall, a former printer, was its director until May 2015. He was replaced, in summer 2015, by Joseph Belletante, researcher in media history.

The museum has works by early printers of Lyon, including Martin Husz, Josse Bade, Sébastien Gryphe, Etienne Dolet, Jean de Tournes, Guillaume Rouillé and Bernard Salomon. It shows the beginnings of Western printing from the fifteenth century — including examples of the work of Sweynheim and Pannartz, Aldus Manutius, Johann Froben, the Estiennes and Christopher Plantin — to the twentieth century. It includes displays of the 20th-century inventions, Higonnet and Moyroud's Lumitype-Photon phototypesetter and the BBR system of computer typesetting.
