= Basil Davenport =

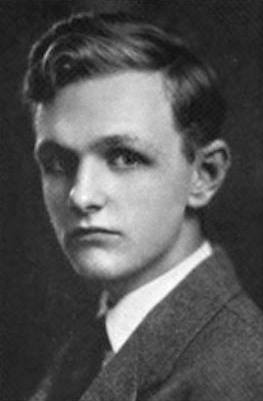
- At Yale University in 1924.
- Born: March 7, 1905; Louisville, Kentucky, US
- Died: April 7, 1966 (aged 61); New York, New York, US
- Education: Yale University
- Occupations: Academic, critic, writer

Basil Davenport (1905–1966) was an American literary critic, academic, anthologist, and writer of science fiction novels and other genres. He was a member of the literary society The Baker Street Irregulars.

== Biography ==
Basil Davenport was born in Louisville, Kentucky on March 7, 1905, the son of Ira William Davenport and Emily Andrews Davison. He had one brother, John A. Davenport. They grew up in Louisville. He attended the Taft School, graduated from Yale in 1926, studied the classics for two years at the University of Oxford, and then taught at Rutgers University. Basil Davenport enlisted in the U.S. Army on March 5, 1943, in New York, during World War II when he was 37 years old. He was never married.

He died at his home in New York City on April 7, 1966, at the age of 61.

The Beinecke Rare Book and Manuscript Library at Yale University has an archive of his collected papers.

== Introductory essays ==
He frequently wrote introductions to works by other authors, such as The Moonstone by Wilkie Collins, Twenty Years After by Alexandre Dumas, and The House of the Seven Gables by Nathaniel Hawthorne. He wrote a sixty-page introduction to the Utopian novel Islandia by Austin Tappan Wright.

== Editor of anthologies ==
His edited books include The Portable Roman Reader and in 1955 a short critical study, Inquiry into Science Fiction.

== Science fiction ==
Davenport described himself as a lifelong fan of science fiction. His science fiction works included Tales to Be Told in the Dark. He was a member of the Hydra Club, a group of sci-fi professionals and their acquaintances who met in New York City during the 1940s and 1950s.

== The New York Times and Saturday Review book critic ==
For the Saturday Review, Davenport reviewed James Branch Cabell's novel Hamlet Had An Uncle, and termed Jurgen, A Comedy of Justice (1919), Cabell's previous and best-known novel, "a masterpiece". During the early 1950s, he co-authored a science-fiction book review column, named "In the Realm of the Spacemen" or "Spacemen's Realm", for The New York Times.
