= Margaret Higonnet =

American author and historian (b. 1941)

Margaret Randolph Higonnet
- Born: 1941 (age 84–85); New Orleans, Louisiana, U.S.
- Occupations: Author, essayist, professor
- Spouse(s): Mahlon Hale (divorced) Patrice Higonnet (m. 1974)
- Children: 1
- Writing career
- Genres: Essay, history, literature
- Subjects: Literature, women's literature

Margaret Randolph Higonnet (née Cardwell; born 1941) is an American author, teacher, and historian. She is Professor Emerita at the University of Connecticut and a local affiliate of the Minda de Gunzburg Center for European Studies at Harvard University.

== Early life and education ==
Margaret Randolph Cardwell was born in New Orleans, Louisiana, in 1941. Her parents were Guy A. Cardwell, a professor and specialist in American literature, and Margaret Cardwell, a librarian at the Mary Institute.

Higonnet attended Bryn Mawr College, graduating A.B. magna cum laude in German in 1963. She studied at the Universidad Nacional Autónoma de México in 1960–1961, at the Eberhard Karls Universität Tübingen in 1963–1964, and at University College London in 1966–1967. She obtained her PhD in comparative literature from Yale University with distinction in 1970. Higonnet began her teaching career as an instructor in the Department of English at George Washington University from 1967 to 1968.

== Career ==
Higonnet started teaching English and comparative literature at the University of Connecticut in 1970, remaining on the faculty until 2016. She chaired the Program on Comparative Literary and Cultural Studies from 1976 to 1979 and served as acting chair again from 1999 to 2000. She has also taught at LMU Munich from 1991 to 1992 and at the Universidade de Santiago de Compostela in 2008.

Higonnet has served as President of the American Conference on Romanticism (1995–1998; now the International Conference on Romanticism), the American Comparative Literature Association (2003–2005), and the Fédération Internationale des Langues et Littératures Modernes (FILLM, 2017–2020). She serves as the Modern Language Association delegate to FILLM. She established the Gender Studies Committee of the International Comparative Literature Association (ICLA) and served as President of the ICLA committee on comparative literary history, CHLEL, from 2010 to 2013. Higonnet has received fellowships from the Radcliffe Institute, the Rutgers Center for Historical Analysis, the Rockefeller Foundation, the Instituto Juan March, the Fulbright Program, and the German Academic Exchange Service (DAAD).

Her scholarship addresses German romantic literature, comparative literature, the literature of World War I, feminist theory, suicide, children's literature, and Thomas Hardy. The 1987 publication Behind the Lines: Gender and the Two World Wars, which she co-edited, analyzed the redefinition of gender roles across Western countries during the two global conflicts. The book received critical attention in academic journals, including reviews in The Women's Review of Books and The Annals of the American Academy of Political and Social Science.

Her 2001 edited volume, Nurses at the Front: Writing the Wounds of the Great War, and her 1999 anthology, Lines of Fire: Women Writers of World War I, focus on recovering women's writings during the First World War. Lines of Fire compiled excerpts from political writing, diaries, letters, memoirs, short fiction, and poetry by women of various nationalities. She also edited two collections of papers in comparative journals drawn from meetings of CHLEL: "New Europe, New Literary Histories" for the Yearbook of Comparative and General Literature and "Gender in Literary History" for Comparative Critical Studies.

== Awards and honors ==
- Best critical article of 1987 ("Narrative Fractures and Fragments"). Children's Literature Association, Literary Criticism Award.
- Best critical article of 1992 ("Civility Books"). Children's Literature Association, Literary Criticism Award.
- "Behind the Lines, Across Boundaries: A Conference in Honor of Margaret R. Higonnet", University of Connecticut, September 22–23, 2016.
- Marquis Who's Who Lifetime Achievement Award, 2018.

== Personal life ==
Higonnet's first marriage to Mahlon Hale ended in divorce. She married Harvard University professor of French history Patrice Higonnet on August 13, 1974. They have a daughter, human rights activist Etelle Higonnet, who is the founder of Coffee Watch and a recipient of the Chevalier de l'Ordre National du Mérite.

== Bibliography ==
=== Books ===
- Horn of Oberon: Jean Paul Richter's "School for Aesthetics". Wayne State University Press. 1973. ISBN 978-0-8143-1500-2. (Published under the name Margaret Hale)
- The Cricket and the Ant. Muster: Desertina. 1979.
- with Carolyn Heilbrun, The Representation of Women in Fiction. Baltimore: Johns Hopkins U. P. 1981. ISBN 0-8018-2928-3.
- with Barbara Rosen, Children's Literature. New Haven: Yale U. P. 1985.
- with Sonya Michel and Jane Jenson, Behind the Lines: Gender and the Two World Wars. New Haven: Yale U. P. 1987. ISBN 978-0-300-04429-4.
- The Sense of Sex: Feminist Perspectives on Hardy. Champaign: Illinois U. P. 1993.
- with Maria de Valdes, New Visions of Creation. Tokyo: U. Tokyo P. 1993.
- Borderwork: Feminist Engagements with Comparative Literature. Ithaca, NY: Cornell U. P. 1994. ISBN 0-8014-2869-6.
- with Joan Templeton, Reconfigured Spheres: Literary Representations of Feminine Space. Amherst, Massachusetts: U. Massachusetts P. 1994. ISBN 0-87023-937-6.
- with VèVè Clark, Shirley Garner, and Ketu Katrak, Antifeminism in the Academy. New York: Routledge. 1996. ISBN 0-415-91070-6.
- British Women Poets of the Nineteenth-Century. New York: Meridian. 1996. ISBN 0-452-01161-2.
- Lines of Fire: Women Writers on World War I. New York: Penguin/Plume. 1999. ISBN 978-0-452-28146-2.
- with Beverly Clark, Girls, Boys, Books, Toys. Baltimore: Johns Hopkins U. P. 1999. ISBN 0-8018-6053-9.
- Nurses at the Front: Writing the Wounds of the Great War. Boston: Northeastern U. P. 2001. ISBN 978-1-55553-484-4.
- Guy Adams Cardwell, Stories and Poetry. New Britain: Hitchcock, 2005.
- with Jarrod Hayes and William Spurlin, Comparatively Queer: Interrogating Identity across Time and Cultures. New York: Palgrave. 2010. ISBN 978-0-230-10436-5.
- with Susan Solomon, Margaret Hall's Letters and Photographs from the Battle Country. Boston: Massachusetts Historical Society. 2014. ISBN 978-1-936520-07-7.
- with Svend Erik Larsen and Steen Bille Jørgensen, Landscapes of Realism: Rethinking Literary Realism in Comparative Perspectives, Vol. 2. Amsterdam: John Benjamins. 2022. ISBN 978-90-272-1085-2.
