= Austin Tappan Wright =

American novelist (1883–1931)

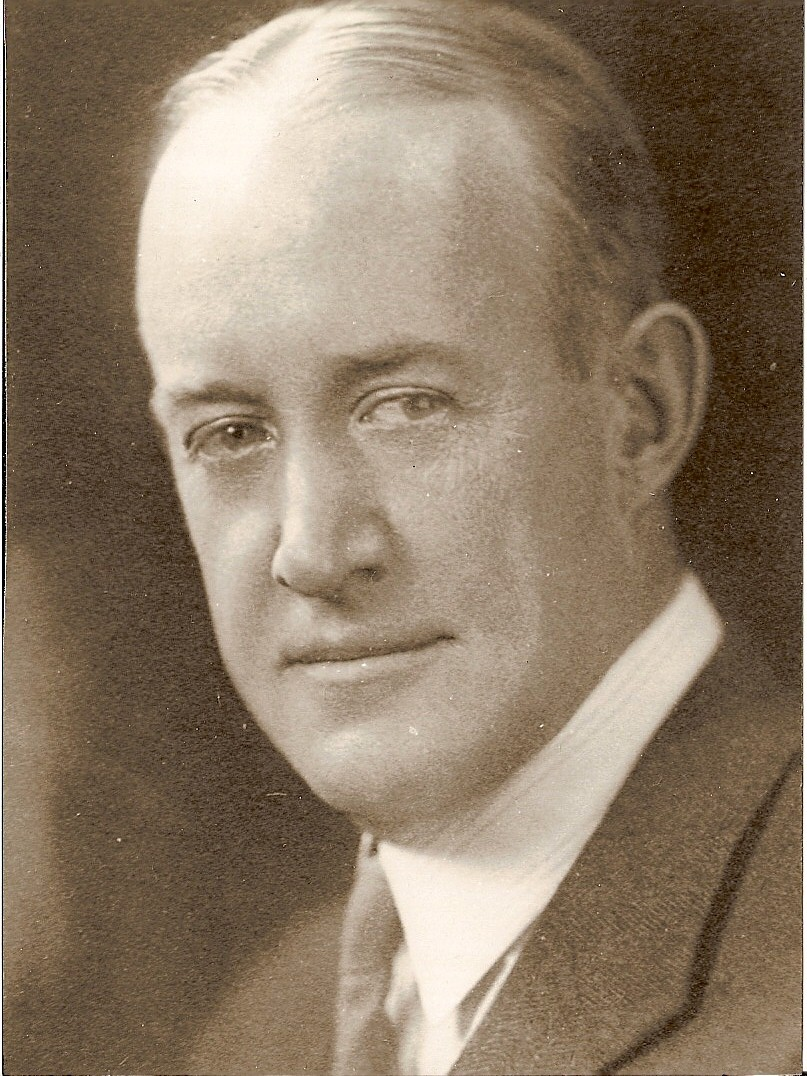
- Born: August 20, 1883; Hanover, New Hampshire, U.S.
- Died: September 18, 1931 (aged 48); Santa Fe, New Mexico, U.S.
- Occupations: Legal scholar, author
- Writing career
- Period: 1915–1931
- Notable work: Islandia (1942)

Austin Tappan Wright (August 20, 1883 – September 18, 1931) was an American legal scholar and author, best remembered for his major work of Utopian fiction, Islandia. He was the son of classical scholar John Henry Wright and novelist Mary Tappan Wright, the brother of geographer John Kirtland Wright, and the grandfather of editor Tappan Wright King.

== Life and family ==
Wright was born in Hanover, New Hampshire. He married, November 14, 1912, Margaret Garrad Stone. They had four children, William Austin, Sylvia, Phyllis, and Benjamin Tappan. The family lived successively in Berkeley, California, and Philadelphia, Pennsylvania. Wright died as a result of an automobile accident near Santa Fe, New Mexico, on September 18, 1931. He was survived by his wife, children and brother.

== Education ==
Wright entered Harvard College in 1901, graduating with an A.B. degree in 1905. He enrolled in the Harvard Law School in 1906, interrupting his course of study there to attend Oxford University for a year in 1906–1907 before returning and graduating cum laude with an LL.B. degree in 1908. He was on the editorial staff of the Harvard Law Review during his last year at Harvard.

== Professional career ==
From 1908 to 1916 Wright worked for the law firm of Brandeis, Dunbar and Nutter (now Nutter McClennen & Fish) in Boston, after which he taught at the School of Jurisprudence at the University of California, Berkeley from 1916 to 1924. His teaching work was interrupted by a period in which he worked as assistant counsel to the U.S. Shipping Board and U.S. Shipping Board Emergency Fleet Corporation in San Francisco in World War I. He also practiced law with the San Francisco law firm of Thatcher and Wright after the war, from 1919 to 1924. From 1924 until his death in 1931 Wright taught at the University of Pennsylvania. He also taught at Stanford University in 1922, the University of Michigan in 1924, and the University of Southern California in 1931 as a visiting or acting professor. The subjects he taught included Agency, Common Law Procedure, Partnership, Corporations, Damages, Persons, Admiralty, Mortgages, Municipal Corporation, Military Law, and Torts, his own main interests being in Corporation Law and Admiralty. He published extensively in various legal journals, particularly the California Law Review and the University of Pennsylvania Law Review.

== Literary career ==
Although Wright's professional colleagues were aware he had literary interests outside his field and some anticipated he might eventually branch out into other areas of literature, these possibilities appeared precluded by his early death. During his lifetime he published just one work of fiction, the short story "1915?" in the Atlantic Monthly for April, 1915.

Few people outside Wright's own family knew he had long been working on an extensive Utopian fantasy about an imaginary country he called Islandia, with an elaborately worked-out history, culture and geography, comparable in scope to J. R. R. Tolkien's life-long writings of Middle-earth. In his papers he left a 2300-page manuscript of a novel exploring the country, with appendices including a glossary of the Islandian language, population tables, a historic peerage, and a gazetteer and history of each of its provinces. Another book-length manuscript purported to be a general history of the country.

After Wright's death his widow typed and edited the manuscript for publication, and following her own death in 1937 their daughter Sylvia further edited and cut the text; the novel Islandia, shorn of Wright's appendices, was finally published in 1942, along with a promotional pamphlet by Basil Davenport, An introduction to Islandia; its history, customs, laws, language, and geography, based on the original supplementary material.

Islandia became a cult classic and ultimately spawned three sequels by Mark Saxton.

== Papers ==
Wright's papers, including carbon typescripts of the uncut version of Islandia and the unpublished Islandia: History and Description, Dreams and Other Verses, college writings, and letters to family members, are in the Houghton Library at Harvard University. Some of his wife's correspondence is in the Fay family papers at Radcliffe College.

== Bibliography ==
=== Fiction ===
- "1915?" (1915) (Google e-text) (another e-text)
- Islandia (1942)
- Islandia: History and Description (unpublished)
- An introduction to Islandia; its history, customs, laws, language, and geography (1942) (with Basil Davenport)
- "The Story of Alwina" (1981)

=== Drama ===
- The Gossipers, a Play in Five Acts (unpublished)

=== Poetry ===
- "The Voyagers" (1906) (Google e-text) (another e-text)
- Dreams and Other Verses (unpublished)

=== Nonfiction ===
==== Legal articles ====
- "Undisclosed Principal in California" (1917)
- "Government Ownership and the Maritime Lien" (1919)
- "California Partnership Law and the Uniform Partnership Act" (1921)
- "Supervening Impossibility of Performing Conditions in Admiralty" (1923)
- "Uniformity of Maritime Law in the United States" (1925)
- "Opposition of the Law to Business Usages" (1926)
- "Private Carriers and the Harter Act" (1926)
- "The New Ohio General Corporation Act" (1927)

==== Book reviews ====
- "Government Liability in Tort by Edwin M. Borchard" (1925)
- "Profit's Dividends and the Law by Prosper Reiter, Jr." (1927)
- "Law of Territorial Water and Maritime Jurisdiction by Phillip C. Jessup" (1928)

==== Geographical articles ====
- "An Islandian on the Islands: a Field Report" (1963)
