= Holt McDougal =

American publisher, mainly textbooks

- Logo of Holt, Rinehart and Winston, the ancestor created in 1960 and now a Holt McDougal imprint
- Parent company: Houghton Mifflin Harcourt
- Founded: March 1960; 66 years ago
- Country of origin: United States
- Headquarters location: Boston, Massachusetts
- Publication types: Textbooks, children's books

Holt McDougal is an American publishing company, a division of Houghton Mifflin Harcourt, that specializes in textbooks for use in high schools.

The Holt name is derived from that of U.S. publisher Henry Holt (1840–1926), co-founder of the earliest ancestor business, but Holt McDougal is distinct from contemporary Henry Holt and Company, which claims the history from 1866. The companies publish different kinds of books.

== History ==
Holt, Rinehart and Winston (HRW) was created in March 1960 by the merger of Henry Holt and Company of New York City (established 1866 as Leypoldt and Holt); Rinehart & Company of New York, descendant of Farrar & Rinehart (est. 1929); and the John C. Winston Company of Philadelphia (est. 1884). The Wall Street Journal reported on March 1, 1960, that Holt stockholders had approved the merger, last of the three approvals. "Henry Holt is the surviving concern, but will be known as Holt, Rinehart, Winston, Inc." In 1967, HRW was acquired by CBS.

In 1985 the retail publishing arm of HRW along with the Henry Holt name was acquired by the Georg von Holtzbrinck Publishing Group based in Stuttgart, Germany. Holtzbrinck acquired the Macmillan name in 2001 and Henry Holt is now an imprint or division of the global Macmillan Group (under Holtzbrinck; not to be confused with Macmillan US).

Also in 1985, the educational publishing arm along with the Holt, Rinehart and Winston name and logo (see image) was acquired by Harcourt. As Harcourt divested further, from 2001 HRW was a division of Harcourt Education owned by Reed Elsevier. Reed sold off parts of Harcourt Education including Holt, Rinehart, and Winston to Houghton Mifflin in 2007, part of a reorganization that created Houghton Mifflin Harcourt (HMH). HRW was then combined with Houghton Mifflin Company's McDougal Littell subsidiary to form Holt McDougal.

== Details ==
Holt McDougal publishes textbooks on mathematics, language arts, social studies, science, health, and world language (French, Spanish, and German). It has published children's books for the Weekly Reader Book Club including Sweet Pickles, Fraggle Rock, and Snoopy. This American publishing company has offices in Austin, Texas and Evanston, Illinois and with its parent company, Houghton Mifflin Harcourt, headquartered in Boston, Massachusetts.

== See also ==
- Books in the United States
