= Sheila Hibben =

American food journalist

- Born: Cecile Craik; 1888; Montgomery, Alabama, US
- Died: 1964 (aged 75–76)
- Occupations: Food critic, cookbook author
- Spouse: Paxton Hibben
- Writing career
- Language: English

Cecile Craik Hibben (1888–1964), better known as Sheila Hibben, was an American food journalist. She served as The New Yorker's first food critic, working for the magazine for 20 years. She also authored several cookbooks.

== Biography ==
She was born Cecile Craik in 1888, in Montgomery, Alabama, and grew up in Italy and France. She served in World War I as a nurse, and received the Croix de Guerre. She married Paxton Hibben in 1916 in Athens, and the couple spent several years in Europe.

When she was hired in 1934, she became The New Yorker's first food critic. She worked there for 20 years, reviewing food and drink in "Markets and Menus", as well as writing a column called "About the House". She was an occasional contributor to Vogue, House Beautiful, and Harper's Bazaar. Upon the death of her husband in 1928, Hibben began writing out of necessity, publishing multiple books, including The National Cookbook (1932), Good Food for Bad Stomachs (1951), American Regional Cookery (1946), and A Kitchen Manual (1941). Perhaps her best known work was The National Cookbook, which became a bestseller and helped her get hired by The New Yorker. Good Food for Bad Stomachs was written at the request of Harold Ross, editor-in-chief of The New Yorker, who suffered from ulcers.

At the time of her death in 1964, Hibben had written more than 350 articles for The New Yorker. In addition to writing, she supplied Rex Stout with menus for his Nero Wolfe novels and stories. In The Nero Wolfe Cookbook, first published by Viking Press in 1973, Stout wrote, "All the dishes in Too Many Cooks were cooked twice—some three times or more—by the late Sheila Hibben and me ... she was my dear and valued friend." In 1934, Hibben was brought to the White House in order to advise the staff on meal preparation. She died in 1964.
