= Stuart P. Sherman =

American literary critic, educator & journalist (1881–1926)

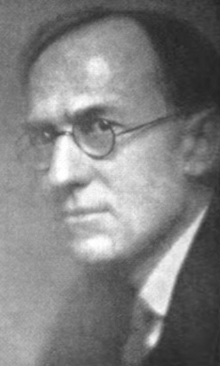
- Born: Stuart Pratt Sherman; October 1, 1881; Anita, Iowa
- Died: August 21, 1926 (aged 44) near Manistee, Michigan
- Burial place: Manchester, Vermont
- Education: Harvard University (Ph.D.)
- Spouse: Ruth Bartlet Mears (m. 1906)
- Children: 1

Stuart Pratt Sherman (October 1, 1881 – August 21, 1926) was an American literary critic, educator and journalist known for his philosophical "feud" with H. L. Mencken. The two men were very close in age, and their career paths have sometimes been compared, but Mencken outlived Sherman by three decades.

== Background, education, and academic career ==
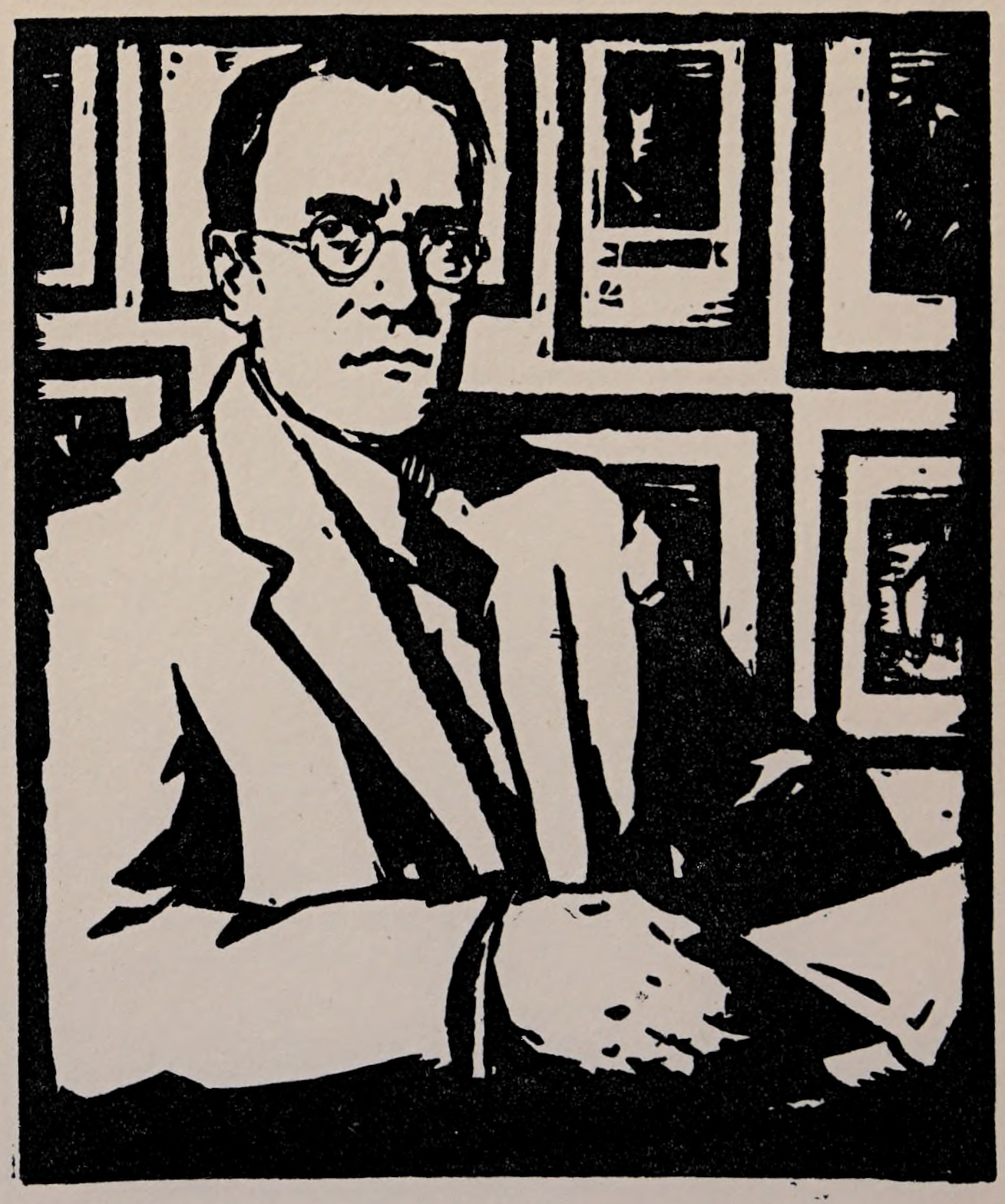
A 1926 woodcut of Sherman

Sherman, who was distantly related to William Tecumseh Sherman, was born to New Englanders John and Ada Martha (Pratt) Sherman on October 1, 1881, in Anita, Iowa. The family later relocated to Rolfe, Iowa, and finally, in 1887, to Los Angeles, California. His father, a druggist and lover of music and poetry, had moved to California in search of a more healthful climate, but he died when Sherman was just 11. The family subsequently returned to New England.

Sherman entered Williams College in 1900, and he won prizes there in Latin, French and German, as well as becoming editor of the Williams Literary Monthly. He graduated from Harvard University with a Ph.D. in 1906 after writing his thesis on the 17th-century dramatist John Ford.

Upon graduation, Sherman became an instructor at Northwestern University for a year before moving to the University of Illinois. In 1908 he was offered a position of the staff of The Nation, to which he was a frequent contributor, but declined when promoted to an associate professor. After appointment to full professor in 1911 and chairman of Illinois's English Department in 1914, he built the department into one of the strongest in the Midwest. He was a natural teacher, noted for his sound scholarship, especially on the works of Matthew Arnold, and for his passion for the living values of literature.

In April 1924, Sherman became editor of Books, the literary supplement to the New York Herald Tribune, which under his editorship became the leading American critical journal.

Sherman was initially an advocate of the Nativist movement in American literature. The Nativist movement defended traditional modes of American literature (which it identified with Anglo-Americans) against Modernism, (which it identified with immigrants). Sherman's supporters in the Nativist controversy included Brander Matthews, Gertrude Atherton and John C. Farrar. Sherman was initially critical of the work of Theodore Dreiser and argued Dreiser's German-American background hindered his ability to express "spiritual values".

== Controversy ==
With the entry of the United States into World War I, Sherman expressed what some deemed a chauvinistic patriotism in an address before the National Council of Teachers of English on December 1, 1917, denouncing both the philosophy of Nietzsche and his American apologist, Henry Louis Mencken. This began a decade long, erudite, and witty feud between Sherman and Mencken. The next salvo from Sherman was an article in the October 1920 issue of The Bookman, "Is There Anything to be Said for Literary Traditions?" where he attacked literary modernism. Interpreting the challenge to conventional morals by younger literary figures as moral relativism, Sherman defended traditional values, nationalism, and even Puritanism, a popular scapegoat of the time. As the decade of the 1920s unfolded however, many argue that Sherman moved perceptibly to the left, eventually embracing modernism and confessing that he had erred in trying to make men good instead of happy. Sherman also changed his mind about the merits of Dreiser's work, and praised An American Tragedy for what he regarded as its "masterly exhaustiveness" of character development.

== Personal life ==
In 1906, Sherman married Ruth Bartlet Mears, daughter of a chemistry professor at Williams, and the couple had a son. Sherman was on vacation with his wife on Lake Michigan seven miles away from Manistee, Michigan when he suffered a fatal heart attack after an accident overturned his canoe. He died on August 21, 1926, at age 44. He is buried in Manchester, Vermont.

== Published works ==
- A Book of Short Stories, General editor Wilbur Lucius Cross, New York, Henry Holt and Company, 1914.
- Introduction to an edition of John Ford's 'Tis Pity She's a Whore / The Broken Heart. Boston, London, D.C. Heath & Co., 1915
- Matthew Arnold: How to Know Him, 1917.
- On Contemporary Literature, New York, Holt, 1917.
- Americans, New York, C. Scribner's sons, 1922.
- The Genius of America, New York, London, C. Scribner's sons, 1923.
- Points of View, New York, Scribner's, 1924.
- Joyous things: or, Forty and upwards: an essay, New York: Hampden Hills Press, 1925.
- Critical Woodcuts, illustrated with portraits engraved on wood by Bertrand Zadig, New York, London, C. Scribner's Sons, 1926.
- The Emotional Discovery of America and Other Essays, New York, Farrar & Rinehart, Inc., 1932.
