= Patrice Higonnet =

French author and historian (born 1938)

- Born: Patrice Louis René Higonnet; 3 February 1938 (age 88); Saint-Cloud, France
- Education: Harvard University (BA, PhD)
- Occupations: Author; essayist; professor; historian
- Spouses: Janet Marian King (m. 1958, divorced) Ethel Parmele Cardwell (m. 1970; died 1973) Margaret Cardwell (m. 1974)
- Children: 3
- Writing career
- Genres: Essay; history; literature
- Subject: French history

Patrice Louis René Higonnet (born 3 February 1938) is a French author, historian, and retired professor who currently serves as a Robert Walton Goelet Research Professor of French History at Harvard University. He previously taught European history.

== Life ==
Patrice Louis René Higonnet was born on 3 February 1938 in Saint-Cloud, France, to René Alphonse Higonnet and Thérèse Higonnet (née David).

His first marriage was to Janet Marian King on 26 May 1958 in Manchester, New Hampshire. They had two children before divorcing: Anne and Philip.

His second marriage was to Ethel Parmele Cardwell (1943–1973), whom he married at Harvard on 3 June 1970. She was raped and murdered in Longfellow Park in Cambridge, Massachusetts, in 1973.

Higonnet subsequently married Ethel's sister, University of Connecticut professor Margaret Higonnet (née Cardwell), on 13 August 1974. They had a daughter named Ethel.

Both Ethel and Margaret possess strong North American roots, descending from Alexander Scott Bullitt, Benjamin Logan, St. George Tucker, and William Logan. Their 3rd great-uncles were Congressmen Alexander Keith Marshall, Thomas Francis Marshall, and Edward C. Marshall. Presidents Thomas Jefferson and Abraham Lincoln were close cousins.
