= Mark Saxton =

American writer and editor (1914–1988)

- Born: November 24, 1914; Mineola, Long Island, New York
- Died: January 7, 1988 (aged 73); New York City, New York
- Occupations: Author, editor

Mark Saxton (November 24, 1914 – January 7, 1988) was an American author and editor. He is chiefly remembered for helping edit for publication Austin Tappan Wright’s Utopian novel Islandia, and for his own three sequels to Wright's work.

== Life ==
Saxton was born November 28, 1914, in Mineola, Long Island, New York, the son of Eugene F. Saxton, vice president, secretary and head of the editorial department of Harper & Brothers, and Martha (Plaisted) Saxton, an editor and school teacher. He had one brother, Alexander Saxton, also a novelist and notable historian. Mark grew up in New York City, where his father worked, and later attended Harvard College, from which he graduated in 1936.

As an adult, he lived in both New York and Mill River, Massachusetts. He married Josephine Stocking; the couple had two children, Russell Steele Saxton and Martha Porter Saxton. Mark Saxton died at his home in New York City from an apparent heart attack at the age of 73 on Thursday, January 7, 1988. He was survived by his children Russell and Martha, his wife having predeceased him by many years.

== Career ==
From the late 1930s to the early 1940s, Saxton was a book editor and advertising manager in New York City for Farrar & Rinehart, which also published his first three novels. During this time he worked with Sylvia Wright to prepare her late father's novel Islandia for publication. The firm published the book in 1942, but Saxton's fascination with the work would be lifelong. Meanwhile, his editorial career was interrupted by service in the Navy during World War II. After his discharge in 1946 he worked as an editor at William Sloane Associates, McGraw-Hill’s Whittlesey House division, and the Harvard University Press, which he left in 1969. Afterwards he was one of the founders of the Gambit, Inc. publishing firm in Boston. From 1980 onward, he was a freelance editor in New York.

== Works ==
Saxton’s first novel was Danger Road (1939); it and the two novels that followed were written during his employment with Farrar & Rinehart, and were published by that firm. A fourth, Prepared for Rage (1947), was also issued by the publisher he worked for at the time, in this instance William Sloane Associates. A long interval passed before Saxton’s next book, Paper Chase (1964), which has the distinction of not being the work that served as the basis for the later movie and television series (that honor goes to John Jay Osborn, Jr.’s similarly titled The Paper Chase (1970).

In his later years, Saxton returned to Wright’s Islandia for his inspiration, and with the permission of the estate set his last three novels in that fictional Utopian realm. It is for these that he is chiefly remembered. The first, The Islar (1969), is a modern-day sequel to the original novel. The others, The Two Kingdoms (1979) and Havoc in Islandia (1982), take place much earlier in the kingdom’s history. All three draw on Wright’s extensive background notes. Houghton Mifflin was the publisher of Saxton’s Islandian novels.

== Bibliography ==
=== Islandian novels ===
- The Islar, a Narrative of Lang III (1969)
- The Two Kingdoms: a Novel of Islandia (1979)
- Havoc in Islandia (1982)

=== Other novels ===
- Danger Road (1939)
- The Broken Circle (1941)
- The Year of August, a Novel of Intrigue (1943)
- Prepared for Rage (1947)
- Paper Chase, a Novel (1964)
