= Farrar & Rinehart =

American publisher (1929–1946)

- Status: Defunct (1946)
- Founded: 1929
- Founder: John C. Farrar; Stanley M. Rinehart; Frederick R. Rinehart
- Successor: Rinehart & Company
- Headquarters location: New York City, U.S.
- Publication types: Books

Farrar & Rinehart (1929–1946) was a United States book publishing company founded in New York. Farrar & Rinehart enjoyed success with both non-fiction and novels, notably, the landmark Rivers of America Series and the first ten books in the Nero Wolfe corpus of Rex Stout. In 1943 the company was recognized with the first Carey-Thomas Award for creative publishing presented by Publishers Weekly.

== History ==
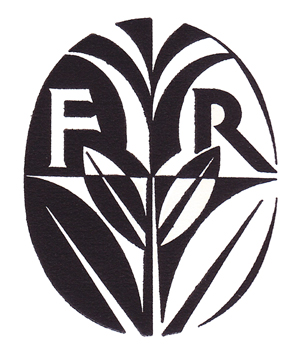
Clarence P. Hornung designed the colophon that appears on the copyright page of every first edition, issued by Farrar & Rinehart

Farrar & Rinehart was founded in June 1929 by John C. Farrar (vice president) and Stanley M. Rinehart, Jr. (president), in partnership with Frederick R. Rinehart. In forming the company, Farrar and the Rineharts left the massive Doubleday, Doran publishing house, the result of a merger between their mutual employer, the George H. Doran Company, with Doubleday, Page & Company in 1927. Both Stanley and Fredrick were the sons of the famous playwright and author, Mary Roberts Rinehart. Mary Roberts Rinehart supported her sons and their company by leaving Doubleday, Doran; her bestselling mysteries became a mainstay of the new imprint.

"We will never grow so large that all members of the firm cannot read and be interested in any book we publish," Farrar said. "While we believe in applying journalistic methods to publishing we feel that ... there is a need for literature that is written in quiet places and that is brought to the public with dignity."

During the early summer of 1929, Farrar & Rinehart designed and distributed its first promotional piece, the first cannon in what they hoped to be a successful advertising campaign for the book Speculation: The Wall Street Gamebook. Published in October, the month of the stock-market crash, it was a complete failure.

In 1931, Farrar & Rinehart acquired the Cosmopolitan Book Corporation from Hearst. Farrar & Rinehart became one of the most successful publishing houses of its era. Its bestsellers included Hervey Allen's Anthony Adverse (1933), which sold more than two million hardcover copies.

In February 1943, Farrar & Rinehart received the first Carey-Thomas Award for creative publishing from Publishers Weekly. Named for U.S. publishers Mathew Carey and Isaiah Thomas, the award recognized good publishing — "the creative idea, cooperation with the writer, careful production and imagination and successful marketing." The Manhattan publisher won the award for seven volumes of the Rivers of America Series, which was found to be "the best example of creative publishing in the year 1942."

In 1946, Farrar departed for a new venture with Roger Straus, a firm that became Farrar, Straus & Giroux. Farrar & Rinehart was renamed Rinehart & Company.

== Authors ==
Dates are the earliest and latest known years of association with Farrar & Rinehart.

- Dorothy Aldis (1931)
- Alexander, Grand Duke of Russia (1933)
- Felipe Alfau (1936)
- Hervey Allen (1933–1945)
- Hugo Fernández Artucio (1942)
- Mary Hunter Austin (1933)
- Mariano Azuela (1932)
- Faith Baldwin (1932–1935)
- Erik Barnouw (1945)
- Ralph Henry Barbour (1932–1935)
- Larry Barretto (1932–1947)
- Lily Adams Beck (1927–1928)
- Harry Bedwell (1942)
- Stephen Vincent Benét (1933–1943)
- S.N. Behrman (1931–1933)
- Allan L. Benson (1929)
- Caryl Brahms and
  S.J. Simon (1940)
- Dorothea Brande (1935)
- Myron Brinig (1930–1945)
- George Britt (1935)
- Ben Lucien Burman (1933)
- Maxwell Struthers Burt (1938)
- Gerald Butler (1943–1946)
- James Branch Cabell (1938–1943)
- Alice Ormond Campbell (1929–35), LCCN no93-5396
- Henry Seidel Canby (1934)
- Robert Cantwell (1931–1934)
- Carl Carmer (1930–1946)
- Roy Chanslor (1931)
- Henry Chapin (1934)
- Agatha Christie (1944–1948; as Mary Westmacott)
- Thomas D. Clark (1942–1943)
- Mabel Cleland (1932)
- Robert P.T. Coffin (1939)
- Colette (1935)
- Marc Connelly (1929–1930)
- Barbara Cooney (1941)
- Courtney Ryley Cooper (1931)
- John Cournos (1933)
- Elizabeth Daly (1940–1943)
- Julian Dana (1939)
- Clemence Dane and
  Helen de Guerry Simpson
- Clyde Brion Davis (1937–1947)
- Owen Davis (1931)
- Guy Endore (1930–1933)
- Elizabeth Enright (1938)
- Dale Eunson (1935)
- Allen Field (1932)
- Temple Field (1931)
- Hulbert Footner (1944)
- Leslie Ford (1935–1937)
- Henry James Forman (1936)
- Peter Freuchen (1935–1938)
- Robert Dean Frisbie (1939)
- David Frome (1935)
- Robert Gessner (1933–1936)
- Enrique Gil Gilbert (1941, second prize)
- Tom Gill (1933–1939)
- Henry J. Glintenkamp (1932)
- Louis Golding (1937)
- Douglas Goldring (1928)
- Herbert Gorman (1929–1945)
- C.W. Grafton (1943–1944)
- Gordon Grant (1936)
- Frank Gruber (1940–1941)
- Ricardo Güiraldes (1935)
- Richard Hagopian (1944)
- Donal Hamilton Haines (1939)
- Edith Key Haines (1931)
- John Hays Hammond (1935)
- T. Swann Harding (1931)
- Eric Hatch (1930)
- Walter Havighurst (1937–1944)
- Robert Henriques (1943)
- Elizabeth Hamilton Herbert (1934)
- Dorothy Heyward (1932)
- Dubose Heyward (1929–1932)
- R.C. Hutchinson (1935)
- Baroness Shidzue Ishimoto (1935)
- Charles R. Jackson (1944)
- Cora Jarrett (1935)
- Hugh MacNair Kahler (1931)
- George S. Kaufman and
  Moss Hart (1930)
- Sophie Kerr (1931)
- Page Kirby (1931–1941)
- Alfred Kreymborg (1939)
- Alexander Laing (1934)
- Alan LeMay (1935–1937)
- Wells Lewis (1939)
- Norman Lindsay (1936)
- Victoria Lincoln (1930)
- Malcolm Edgeworth Little (1934)
- Robert H. Lowie (1934)
- Laetitia McDonald (1934)
- Marguerite McIntire (1942)
- George Mackaness (1931)
- Archibald MacLeish (1936–1937)
- Helene Magaret (1940)
- Pierre Marcelin and
  Phillippe Thoby-Marcelin (1944)
- Ludwig Marcuse (1933)
- Groucho Marx (1930)
- Paul Wilhelm Massing (1935)
- Cecile Hulse Matschat (1938–1944)
- Beatrice Burton Morgan (1933)
- Nigel Morland (1938)
- John Nicol (1936)
- Kenyon Nicholson and
  Charles Robinson (1933)
- Blair Niles (1939)
- Charles Norris (1935)
- Otto Nuckel (1930)
- Fulton Oursler (1937–1943)
- Elizabeth Page (1930–1939)
- W.T. Palmer (1932)
- Forbes Parkhill (1945)
- Innis Patterson (1930)
- Melville Davisson Post (1930)
- Ezra Pound (1933–1937)
- Dawn Powell (1929–1938)
- John Hyde Preston (1930)
- Henry F. Pringle (1939)
- Fred Puleston (1930)
- Terence Rattigan (1938)
- J.B. Rhine (1934–1937)
- Mary Roberts Rinehart (1929–1946)
- Selma Robinson (1931)
- Andy Rooney (1944–1946)
- Thomas Rourke (1931–1933)
- Robert Rylee (1935–1937)
- Margaret Sanger (1931)
- Malcolm Saville (1945)
- Mark Saxton (1939–1943)
- Leo W. Schwarz (1933–1943)
- Upton Sinclair (1931–1938)
- William Sloane (1937)
- Floyd Benjamin Streeter (1941)
- D.E. Stevenson (1939)
- Phil Stong (1937–1942)
- Rex Stout (1933–1944)
- William L. Stuart (1945)
- Ruth Suckow (1934–1942)
- Frank Swinnerton (1934)
- Arthur Benson Tourtellot (1941)
- Thomas Frederic Tweed (1933)
- Stanley Vestal (1945)
- Frank Waters (1941–1942)
- Francis Walton (1935–1945)
- Lynd Ward (1930)
- Alec Waugh (1941)
- Evelyn Waugh (1932–1934)
- Frederick Way Jr. (1942–1943)
- Garnett Weston (1933)
- E.B. White (1931)
- Margaret Widdemer (1930–1945)
- Fredric Wight (1935–1937)
- Harry Emerson Wildes (1943)
- Christa Winsloe (1933)
- Cornell Woolrich (1945)
- Austin Tappan Wright (1942)
- Philip Wylie (1931–1944)
