= Paxton Hibben =

American diplomat (1880–1928)

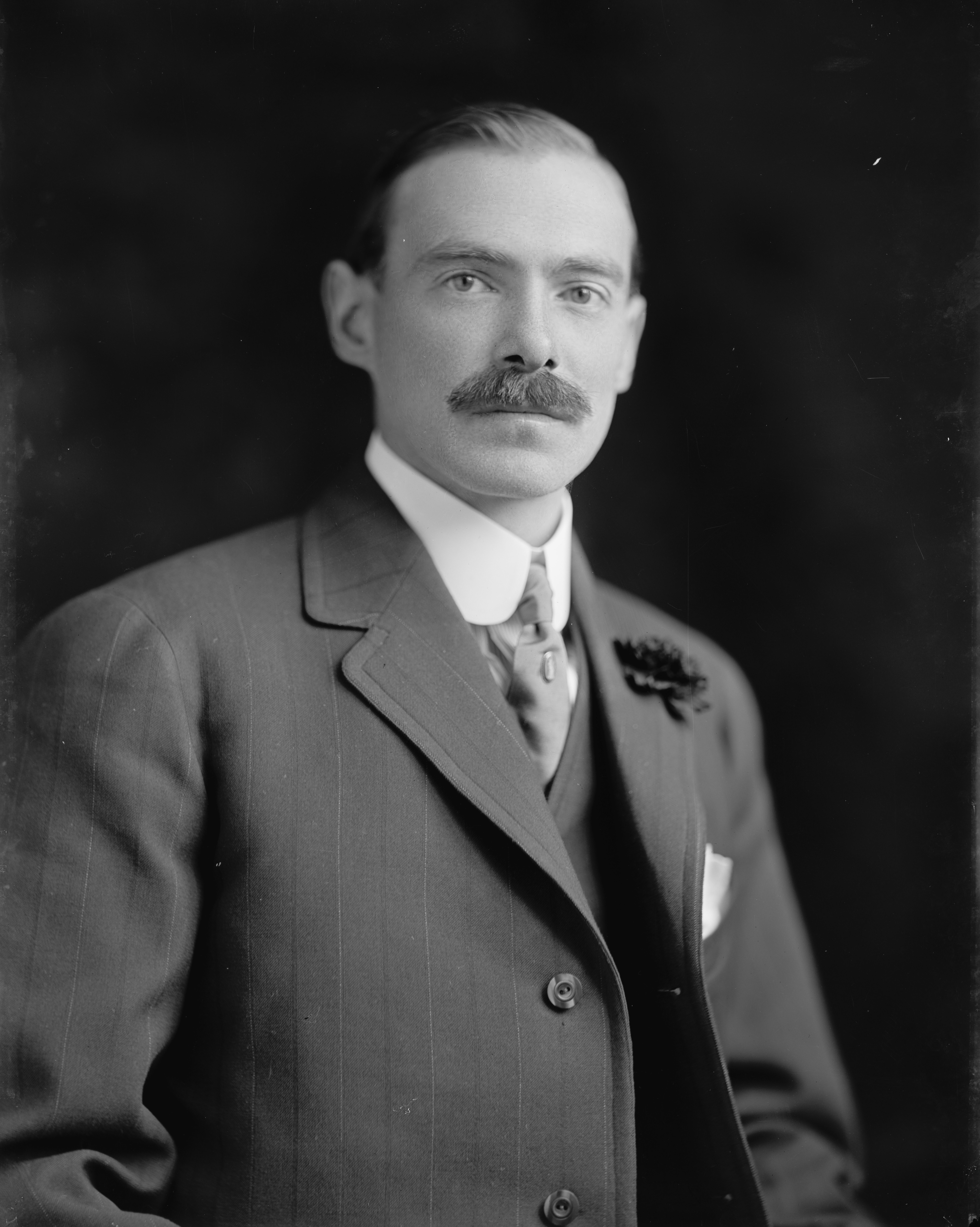
- Hibben, 1905–1928
- Born: Paxton Pattison Hibben; December 5, 1880; Indianapolis, Indiana, United States
- Died: December 5, 1928 (aged 48); St. Vincent's Hospital; Manhattan, New York City, United States
- Burial place: Moscow's Novodevichiy Monastery Cemetery
- Military career
- Allegiance: US
- Branch: United States Army
- Service years: 1917–1924
- Rank: Captain
- Conflicts: World War I
- Other work: Diplomat, journalist and author

Paxton Pattison Hibben (December 5, 1880 – December 5, 1928) had a short but eventful career as a diplomat, journalist, author and humanitarian. After graduation from college he received a diplomatic appointment and served for seven years at a number of foreign posts. He then joined the Progressive Party and assisted Theodore Roosevelt in his 1912 presidential campaign. Hibben became a roving war correspondent in World War I, reporting on military action from several European fronts. He served on a military relief commission in Armenia after the war, and went on to assist the Red Cross in its efforts to rescue children in the Russian famine of 1921-23. Hibben wrote extensively on politics and international affairs, and published books on the Russian famine, the Greek monarchy, Henry Ward Beecher and William Jennings Bryan. His untimely death at age forty-eight was honored by the Russian government with a hero's burial in a Moscow cemetery.

== Early life ==
Paxton Hibben was born and raised in Indianapolis, Indiana. He graduated from Princeton University with honors in 1903, then earned a law degree from Harvard. He chose a career in diplomacy, and succeeded in getting a personal endorsement from President Theodore Roosevelt in 1905 for an appointment in the Diplomatic and Consular Service.

== Career ==
His first post was in St. Petersburg, where he witnessed the bloody street fighting of the 1905 Russian Revolution. The Russo-Japanese War had just ended and there were a number of Japanese prisoners of war interned in St. Petersburg. Hibben volunteered aid and comfort to them, and assisted in their repatriation. For this service the Japanese government awarded him its highest civilian medal, the Order of the Sacred Treasure, in 1906. Hibben went on to serve in Mexico City, Bogotá, The Hague and Santiago, Chile.

Hibben compiled a good record in the practice of diplomacy, but a series of public indiscretions forced him to resign from the State Department in 1912. He then joined Theodore Roosevelt's Progressive Party campaign for the presidency, and served as the full-time director of the Progressive Service's Bureau of Education. After Roosevelt's loss in 1912, Hibben remained active in Progressive Party politics and ran in 1914 as its Congressional candidate from his home district in Indiana; he was defeated.

=== Journalism ===
With the outbreak of World War I in 1914, Hibben turned his hand to journalism and became a war correspondent, first for Collier's Weekly and later for the Associated Press. The AP sent him to Athens in 1915 to cover Greek politics, where he became an ally of King Constantine in his struggle to keep Greece neutral in the war. Under Allied pressure, Constantine failed and was forced into exile in a bloody coup that prompted Hibben to write a book exposing the intrigue. His book was officially suppressed and did not see publication until well after the war ended.

=== Military career ===
When the U.S. entered the war in 1917, Hibben volunteered for officer training in the Army and rose to the rank of captain in the artillery. He served in France during and after the war, where his many language skills proved him useful as an interpreter in peace negotiations. In 1919 Hibben joined a military mission in Armenia to assist in relief efforts there to rescue a destitute population. He was deeply impressed with the suffering of the Armenians, and when that crisis was followed by a full-scale famine in Southwest Russia in 1921, Hibben marshaled all his resources to assist in famine relief.

After a tour of the famine region in 1921, he published an account of the dire conditions there and joined an international plea to the U.S. government for help. The U.S. responded with massive shipments of food, clothing and medical supplies under the direction of the American Relief Administration (ARA), headed by Herbert Hoover, who was then Secretary of Commerce. Working with the Russian Red Cross, Hibben supplemented the ARA program with a special effort to rescue hordes of Russian children made homeless by the famine. With Hibben's support, the Red Cross set up numerous orphanages called detskiy dom, or "detdoms", where thousands of rescued children were not only housed and fed but given schooling and job training. While the ARA was credited with overcoming the famine, Hibben was critical of its procedures, and engaged in acrimonious public debates with Hoover until the famine crisis was over in 1924.

Hibben held a tolerant view of the Bolshevik Revolution, which he saw as a legitimate social exercise on the part of the Russian people. He defended his view in public, which earned him much condemnation, particularly in the post-war period of 'Red hysteria' that prevailed in the 1920s.

In 1923 Hibben, then a captain in the army reserve, applied for promotion to colonel. This triggered a protest by some in the military, who questioned Hibben's loyalty because of his socialist politics and his friendship with the Russians. The Army ordered a board of inquiry to investigate Hibben's record, a procedure that dragged on for two years. No credible evidence of disloyalty could be found, and the case was dismissed without a finding in 1925. Hibben retained his captain's commission but never received the promotion to colonel. The affair drew a lot of attention in the media, which saw it as a freedom of speech issue.

=== Social and literary involvement ===
Hibben's final public act involved protest over the infamous Sacco-Vanzetti murder-trials of the 1920s. In the summer of 1927, with Sacco and Vanzetti on death row, he joined other literary figures such as Edna St. Vincent Millay and Dorothy Parker in mass marches in Boston, charging - in vain - that the convicted Italian anarchists had not gotten a fair trial. The protesters, who had been forbidden to march, were arrested and booked repeatedly, and after the execution were fined and ordered to leave town.

In 1927 Hibben published a biography of Henry Ward Beecher. The work became an instant sensation because it was the first to document the famous preacher's dark side, notably his adulterous affair with a married woman in his congregation. The original printing was widely suppressed, but the book was reprinted to critical acclaim in 1942 and again in 1974. Hibben had partially written his final work, a biography of William Jennings Bryan, before dying; a colleague completed the book.

== Death and burial ==
Hibben became ill with influenza on Thanksgiving night at his residence at 422 West Twenty-second Street in Manhattan, New York City. He died on his birthday, December 5, 1928, at St. Vincent's Hospital.

He was survived by his wife Sheila and daughter Jill. Sheila consented to the request of the Soviet government that his ashes be sent to Moscow for burial as a heroic American friend of the Russian people. Following a state funeral in Red Square in 1929, his ashes were entombed in the cemetery of Moscow's Novodevichy Convent, among the literary greats of Russia.

John Dos Passos, an influential American modernist writer, eulogized Hibben in the chapter "A Hoosier Quixote" of his novel 1919.
