= Myron Brinig =

American author (1896–1991)

- Born: December 22, 1896; Minneapolis, Minnesota, U.S.
- Died: May 13, 1991 (aged 94); New York City, U.S.
- Education: New York University; Columbia University
- Occupation: Novelist

Myron Brinig (December 22, 1896 – May 13, 1991) was an American author who wrote 22 novels from 1929 to 1958.

== Biography ==
=== Early life and education ===
Brinig was born in Minneapolis, Minnesota to Romanian-Jewish parents, but grew up in Butte, Montana. Brinig began studying at New York University in 1914, where poet Joyce Kilmer gave him lectures on writing. He then studied at Columbia University and started his career by writing short stories for magazines. Brinig's first novel, Madonna Without Child, was released in 1929. Published by Doubleday, the novel tells the story of a woman who is obsessed with another woman's baby.

=== Career ===
Many of Brinig's early novels depicted the settlement and development of Montana, the state he grew up in. These novels include Singermann (1929), Wide Open Town (1931), This Man Is My Brother (1932), and The Sun Sets in the West (1935). Brinig based the main character of these novels, Singermann, on his father, Moses Brinig, who was a Romanian immigrant and shopkeeper. Brinig's novels often depicted miners, labor organizers, farmers, and businessmen living in Montana. These usually became bestsellers in the United States and were praised by critics of The New York Times. One of the best-selling novels, The Sisters, was adapted to a feature-length film in 1938, starring Bette Davis and Errol Flynn.

Brinig's novels often dealt with homosexuality. It was a common theme for Brinig because he was a homosexual himself (although he was publicly closeted all his life). According to the Gay & Lesbian Literary Heritage, Brinig was the "first American Jewish novelist to write in any significant way about the gay experience."

In 1951, The New York Times Book Review said Brinig's "sentimental streak and his sympathetic touch with characters usually lend his books a warm glow of humanity, if not of art." At the beginning of his career, Brinig was praised by critics for his "artistry and inventivenss in narrative, character and incident." In the early 1930s, he was described as one of the leading young writers in America. Brinig's last novels, however, were met with mixed reviews from critics, who criticized them for their "verbosity and banality." Brinig died on May 13, 1991. The cause of his death was gastrointestinal hemorrhage.

== Works ==
Novels

1. Madonna Without Child (1929)
2. Singermann (1929)
3. Anthony In The Nude (1930)
4. Copper City (1931)
5. Wide Open Town (1931; reissued 1993)
6. This Man Is My Brother (1932)
7. The Flutter of an Eyelid (1933; reissued 2020)
8. Out of Life (1934)
9. The Sun Sets in the West (1935)
10. The Sisters (1937)
11. May Flavin (1938)
12. Anne Minton's Life (1939)
13. All of Their Lives (1941)
14. The Family Way (1942)
15. The Gambler Tales a Wife (1943)
16. You and I (1945)
17. Hour of Nightfall (1947)
18. No Marriage in Paradise (1949)
19. Footsteps on the Stairs (1950)
20. The Sadness in Lexington Avenue (1951)
21. Street of the Three Friends (1953)
22. The Looking Glass Heart (1958)
