= Louis Moyroud =

French-born American inventor

Louis Marius Moyroud (pronounced MOY-rood; February 16, 1914 – June 28, 2010) was a French-born American inventor who co-developed the phototypesetting process with Rene Alphonse Higonnet, which allows text and images to be printed on paper using a photoengraving process, a method that made the traditional publishing method of hot metal typesetting obsolete.

== Biography ==
Louis Marius Moyroud was born on 16 February 1914 in Moirans, Isère, France. He attended engineering schools and received a government scholarship to study engineering at the École nationale supérieure d'arts et métiers, graduating in 1936. He served in the French Army as a second lieutenant starting in 1936, and was promoted to first lieutenant in 1939. He was hired in 1941 by LMT Laboratories, an ITT Corporation subsidiary based in Lyon.

Around 1943, Higonnet visited a printing plant where he saw the existing typesetting process for offset printing, in which molten lead was cast to form lines of type to make a single copy of a page which was printed and then photographed so that an offset printing plate could be produced through a photographic process. They thought that the process "was insane" and sought ways to produce directly the negative of the photographed page thus eliminating the hot metal steps. They developed a device they called "Lumitype" (changed to "Photon" when later developed in the US), which directly exposed to film letters selected from a spinning disk using a strobe light resulting in a negative which could then be photoengraved to make offset printing plates, which they first unveiled in France in September 1946.

They moved to the United States in 1948, where the Graphic Arts Research Foundation was created to foster further development of their photocomposing method, which was patented in the U.S. in 1957. While the process they developed had higher initial costs, Rini Paiva of the National Inventors Hall of Fame described how the photocomposing process "definitely revolutionized the printing industry", allowing books, magazines and newspapers to be printed more easily and at substantially lower cost.

The foundation had spent $1 million by 1949 to develop the process, which was available for use at a price of $400 per month. The first book printed by their device was The Wonderful World of Insects in 1953 as a demonstration for MIT Press, which included 46 photographs on its 292 pages. Vannevar Bush called the process "a milestone in the graphic arts"> In 1954, The Patriot Ledger in Quincy, Massachusetts became the first newspaper to adopt the method for all of their printing.

Higonnet and Moyroud were inducted into the National Inventors Hall of Fame in 1985.

Moyroud died at age 96 on June 26, 2010, in his home in Delray Beach, Florida. He was survived by three sons. His wife, Marie-Thérèse Meynet, had died in 2008.
