= John C. Farrar =

American poet (1896–1974)

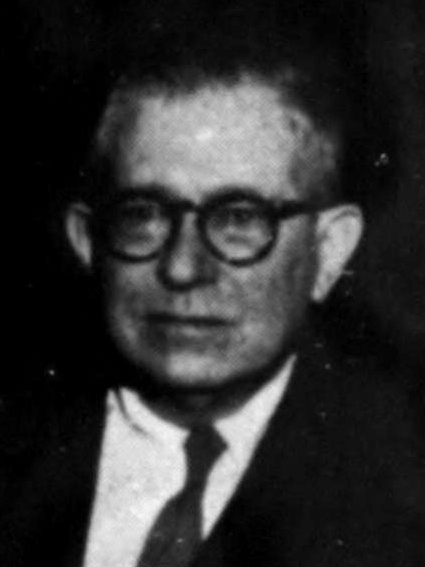
- Farrar c. 1956
- Born: John Chipman Farrar; February 25, 1896; Burlington, Vermont, U.S.
- Died: November 5, 1974 (aged 78); New York City, U.S.
- Education: Yale University (BA)
- Occupation: Publisher
- Known for: Farrar & Rinehart; Farrar, Straus and Giroux, Bread Loaf Writers' Conference
- Spouse: Margaret Petherbridge

John Chipman Farrar (February 25, 1896 – November 5, 1974) was an American editor, writer, and publisher. Farrar founded two publishing companies — Farrar & Rinehart and Farrar, Straus and Giroux. He also conceived and founded the Breadloaf Writers' Conference in 1926.

== Life ==
Farrar was born in Burlington, Vermont. After serving in World War I as an aviation inspector, he graduated in 1919 from Yale University, where he contributed to campus humor magazine The Yale Record and was a member of Skull and Bones. In that year his book Forgotten Shrines was awarded the Yale Younger Poets Prize.

He became editor of The Bookman, up to its 1927 purchase by Seward Collins. Going into publishing, he worked for two years at Doubleday, Doran and Company. Then in 1929 he was a founder of the house of Farrar & Rinehart, with Stanley M. Rinehart Jr. and Frederick R. Rinehart, sons of Mary Roberts Rinehart who had also been at Doubleday Doran.

During the Second World War, Farrar took a post in the Office of War Information's Overseas News and Features Bureau. Farrar soon took a leave of absence to serve overseas. He spent several months in the Mediterranean, where, as the Allies advanced on Italy and North Africa, he took charge of Psychological Warfare in Algeria. Upon Farrar's return from Algeria he spent the rest of 1945 winding down his work on the army magazines known as Victory and America.

Later, after war work in World War II, he was a founder of Farrar, Straus and Giroux. Also, he is considered to be influential in the successful establishment of the Bread Loaf Writers' Conference at Middlebury College in Middleburg, Vermont. According to Frances Stonor Saunders (Who Paid the Piper? The CIA and the Cultural Cold War, p. 242) Farrar also played a role in Cord Meyer's appointment of John Hunt to replace the Congress for Cultural Freedom's ailing head Michael Josselson. Farrar recommended Hunt for his "executive ability, a careful head and a sense of mission for the things we all believe in." His work appeared in Harper's.

In 1926, Farrar married crossword puzzle pioneer Margaret Petherbridge.

Farrar died in New York City. He is buried at Lakeside Cemetery in Burlington, Vermont.

== Works ==
- Portraits, Yale prize poem, Yale University Press, 1916
- Forgotten Shrines. Yale University Press. 1919. "John Chipman Farrar"
- Songs for Parents. Yale University Press. 1921. "John Chipman Farrar."
- Gold-Killer: A Mystery of the New Underworld, as John Prosper, with Prosper Buranelli New York: Doran 1922
- The Bookman Anthology of Essays, editor, George H. Doran Company, 1923
- Songs for Johnny-Jump-Up, R.R. Smith, Inc., 1930

=== Anthologies ===
- John Williams Andrews; Stephen Vincent Benét; John Chipman Farrar; Pierson Underwood, eds. (1919). The Yale Book of Student Verse, 1910–1919. Yale University Press.
- Charles Wharton Stork, ed. (1920). Contemporary Verse Anthology: Favorite Poems Selected from the Magazine "Contemporary Verse.". E.P. Dutton & Company. p. 211. "John Chipman Farrar."
