= René Alphonse Higonnet =

French engineer and inventor (1902–1983)

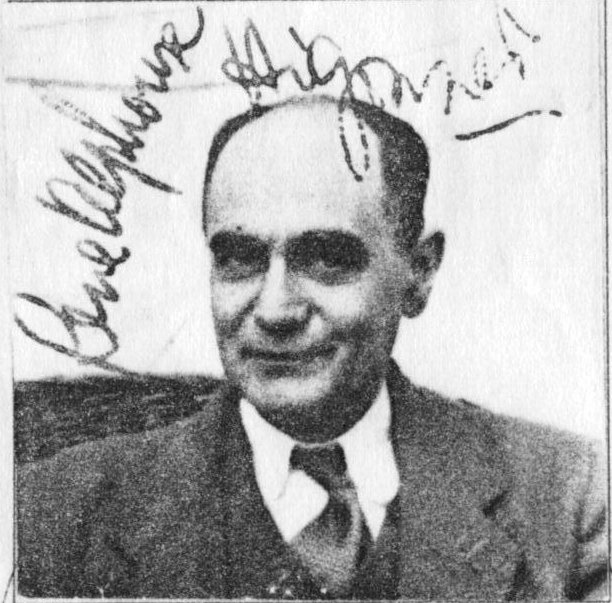
Higonnet in 1952

René Alphonse Higonnet (April 5, 1902 – October 13, 1983) was a French engineer and inventor who co-developed the phototypesetting process with Louis Moyroud, which allows text and images to be printed on paper using a photoengraving process, a method that made the traditional publishing method of hot metal typesetting obsolete.

== Biography ==
Rene Alphonse Higonnet was born in Valence, Drôme in southeastern France on April 5, 1902, and attended the Lycée de Tournon and the Electrical Engineering School of the University of Grenoble. He was awarded a scholarship by the Institute of International Education to attend Carleton College in 1922 where he spent one year and then attended the Harvard School of Engineering and Applied Sciences. He developed a strong love for the United States while he was a student there, admiring the fact that it "had no national police force, no military draft, and hardly any income taxes" at the time, as his son would later recall.

From 1924 to 1948, he was employed by Le Matériel Téléphonique, a French subsidiary of ITT Corporation. In the early 1940s, Moyroud and Higonnet visited a printing plant, where they saw the traditional printing process of hot metal typesetting, in which molten lead was cast to form lines of type to make the print for a newspaper or book, which was then photographed to produce a negative necessary for offset printing. The two thought that the process of printing one copy from lead type and then photographing it "insane" and sought alternative methods that would make a negative directly. They developed a device they called Lumitype (called "Photon" in the US) that used a typewriter-like input device to allow letters to be selected from a spinning disk using a strobe light and projected onto photographic paper which could then be photoengraved to make printing plates, which they first unveiled in France in September 1946.

They moved to the United States, where the Graphic Arts Research Foundation was created to foster further development of their photocomposing method, which was patented in the U.S. in 1957. While the process they developed had higher initial costs, Rini Paiva of the National Inventors Hall of Fame described how the photocomposing process "definitely revolutionized the printing industry", allowing books, magazines and newspapers to be printed more easily and at substantially lower cost. The Photon machine they created could generate type four times faster than a Linotype machine and could be operated by anyone who could type, without the assistance of specialized workers.

The foundation had spent $1 million by 1949 to develop the process, which was available for use at a price of $400 per month. The first book printed by their device was The Wonderful World of Insects in 1953 as a demonstration for MIT Press, which included 46 photographs on its 292 pages. Vannevar Bush called the process "a milestone in the graphic arts" In 1954, The Patriot Ledger in Quincy, Massachusetts became the first newspaper to adopt the method for all of their printing.

Higonnet had three sons with his wife Marie-Thérèse Higonnet (née Dávid): Harvard professor Patrice Higonnet, Rene Paul Higonnet, and Bernard Trevor Higonnet. He also had a step-daughter, Marion, from Thérèse's first husband.

Higonnet returned to Europe in 1968 and lived in Switzerland until his death on October 13, 1983.

Higonnet and Moyroud were inducted into the National Inventors Hall of Fame in 1985.
